= Romansh language =

Gallo-Romance language of Switzerland

Romansh
- romontsch, rumantsch, rumauntsch, rumàntsch
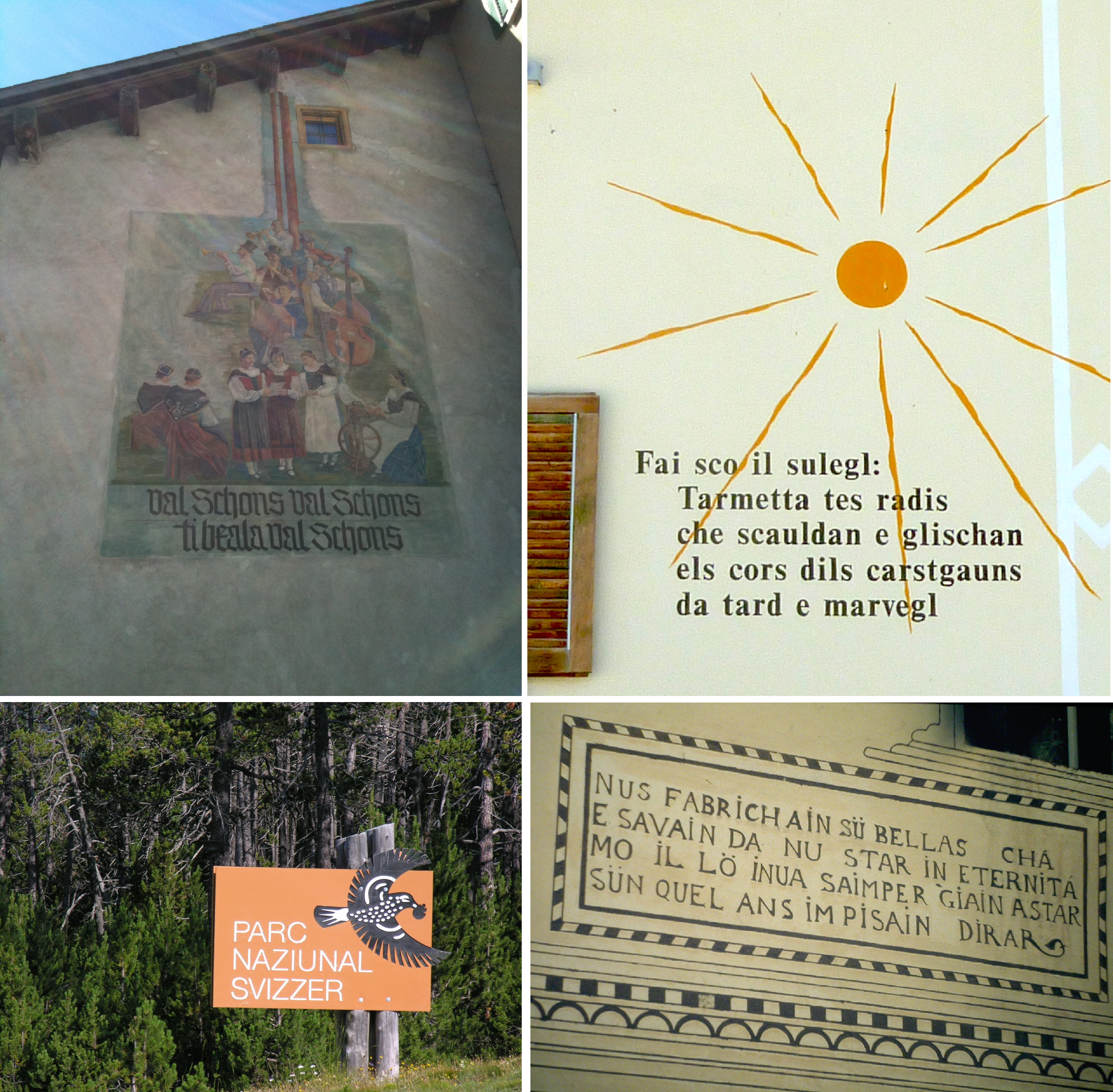
- From top left to bottom right: Sutsilvan inscription in Andeer, Sursilvan inscription in Sagogn, Rumantsch Grischun signal in the Swiss National Park, Vallader in Guarda
- Pronunciation: [ʁoˈmɔntʃ] [rʊˈmantʃ] [rʊˈmɛntʃ] [rʊˈmaʊ̯ntʃ] [rəˈmøntʃ]
- Native to: Switzerland
- Region: Grisons (Graubünden)
- Ethnicity: Romansh
- Native speakers: Main language: 40,000 (2019); Regular speakers: 60,000 (2000)
- Language family: Indo-European: Italic; Latino-Faliscan; Latinic; Romance; Italo-Western; Western; Gallo-Iberian?; Gallo-Romance; Gallo-Rhaetian?; Rhaeto-Romance; Romansh
- Standard forms: Sursilvan; Vallader; Putèr; Surmiran; Sutsilvan; Rumantsch Grischun
- Dialects: Sursilvan; Tuatschin; Vallader; Jauer; Putèr; Surmiran; Sutsilvan
- Writing system: Latin

Official status
- Official language in: Switzerland

Language codes
- ISO 639-1: rm
- ISO 639-2: roh
- ISO 639-3: roh
- Glottolog: roma1326
- ELP: Romansch
- Linguasphere: 51-AAA-k
- IETF: rm
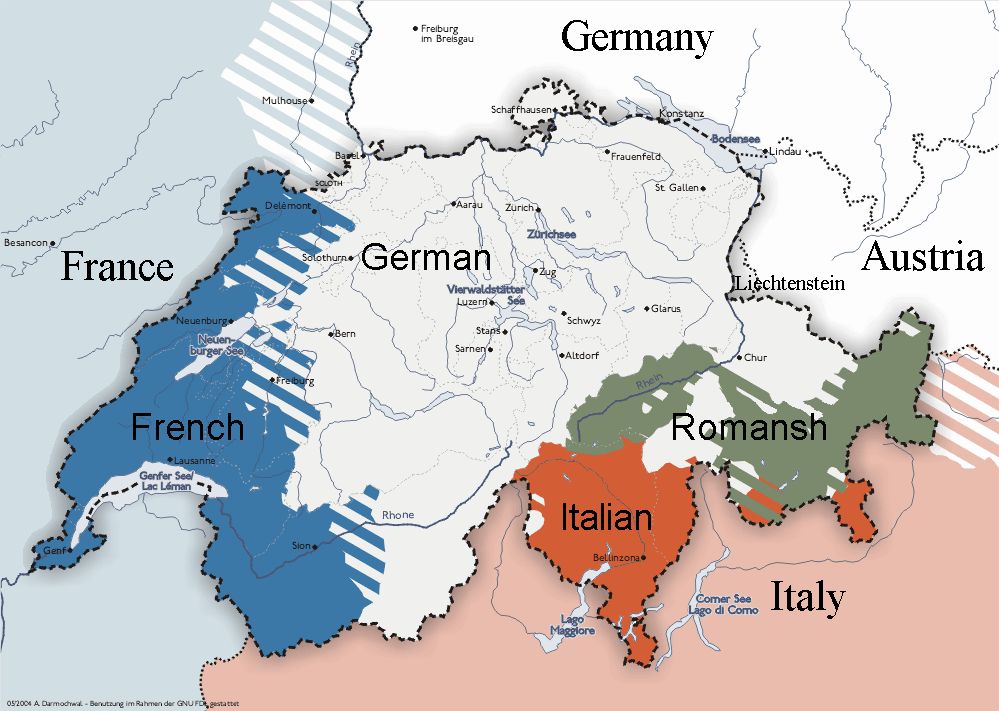
- The traditional Romansh-speaking parts of Switzerland

- Romansh is classified as Definitely Endangered by the UNESCO Atlas of the World's Languages in Danger.

Romansh (/roʊˈmænʃ, roʊˈmɑːnʃ/ roh-MA(H)NSH; sometimes also spelled Romansch and Rumantsch) (Note: Sursilvan: romontsch [ʁoˈmɔntʃ]; Vallader, Surmiran, and Rumantsch Grischun: rumantsch [rʊˈmantʃ]; Putèr: rumauntsch [rʊˈmɛntʃ]; Sutsilvan: rumàntsch [rʊˈmantʃ], [rʊˈmaʊ̯ntʃ], [rəˈmøntʃ]; Jauer: [rʊˈmaʊ̯ntʃ]) is a Romance language of the Gallo-Romance and/or Rhaeto-Romance branch of languages spoken predominantly in the Swiss canton of the Grisons (Graubünden). Romansh has been recognized as a national language of Switzerland since 1938, and as an official language in correspondence with Romansh-speaking citizens since 1996, along with German, French, and Italian. It also has official status in the canton of the Grisons alongside German and Italian and is used as the medium of instruction in schools in Romansh-speaking areas. It is sometimes grouped by linguists with Ladin and Friulian as the Rhaeto-Romance languages, though this is disputed.

Romansh is one of the descendant languages of the spoken Latin language of the Roman Empire, which by the 5th century AD replaced the Celtic and Raetic languages previously spoken in the area. Romansh retains a small number of words from these languages. Romansh has also been strongly influenced by German in vocabulary and morphosyntax. The language gradually retreated to its current area over the centuries, being replaced in other areas by Alemannic and Bavarian dialects. The earliest writing identified as Romansh dates from the 10th or 11th century, although major works did not appear until the 16th century, when several regional written varieties began to develop. During the 19th century the area where the language was spoken declined due to the industrialization of Switzerland, but the Romansh speakers had a literary revival and started a language movement dedicated to halting the decline of their language.

In the 2000 Swiss census, 35,095 people (of whom 27,038 live in the canton of the Grisons) indicated Romansh as the language of "best command", and 61,815 as a "regularly spoken" language. In 2010, Switzerland switched to a yearly system of assessment that uses a combination of municipal citizen records and a limited number of surveys. In 2019, 40,074 Swiss residents primarily spoke Romansh; in 2017, 28,698 inhabitants of the canton of the Grisons (14.7% of the population) used it as their main language.

Romansh is divided into five different regional dialect groups (Sursilvan, Vallader, Putèr, Surmiran, and Sutsilvan), each with its own standardized written language. In addition, a pan-regional variety called Rumantsch Grischun was introduced in 1982, which is controversial among Romansh speakers.

== Linguistic classification ==
Romansh is a Romance language descending from Vulgar Latin, the spoken language of the Roman Empire. Among the Romance languages, Romansh stands out because of its peripheral location. This has resulted in several archaic features. Another distinguishing feature is the centuries-long language contact with German, which is most noticeable in the vocabulary and, to a lesser extent, the syntax of Romansh. Romansh belongs to the Gallo-Romance branch of the Romance languages, which includes languages such as French, Occitan, and Lombard. The main feature placing Romansh within the Gallo-Romance languages is the fronting of Latin /u/ to [y] or [i], as seen in Latin muru(m) "wall", which is mür or mir in Romansh.

The main features distinguishing Romansh from the Gallo-Italic languages to the south, and placing it closer to Ladin, Friulian and Franco-Provencal, are:

- Palatalization of Latin K and G in front of A, as in Latin canem "dog", which is tgaun in Sursilvan, tgang in Surmiran, and chaun in Putèr and Vallader (the difference between ⟨tg⟩ and ⟨ch⟩ being purely orthographic, as both represent /tɕ/); Lombard can, French chien. This sound change is partially absent in some varieties of Romansh, however, especially in Sursilvan, where it may have been reversed at some point: Sursilvan casa and Vallader chasa "house".
- Pluralisation with -s suffix, derived from the Latin accusative case (though see Romance plurals § Origin of vocalic plurals), as in buns chavals "good horses" as opposed to Lombard bon cavai; French bons chevaux, yet identical to Portuguese bons cavalos.
- Retention of L following /p b k ɡ f/: clav "key" from Latin clavem, as opposed to Lombard ciav; French clef.

Another defining feature of the Romansh language is the use of unstressed vowels. All unstressed vowels except /a/ disappeared.

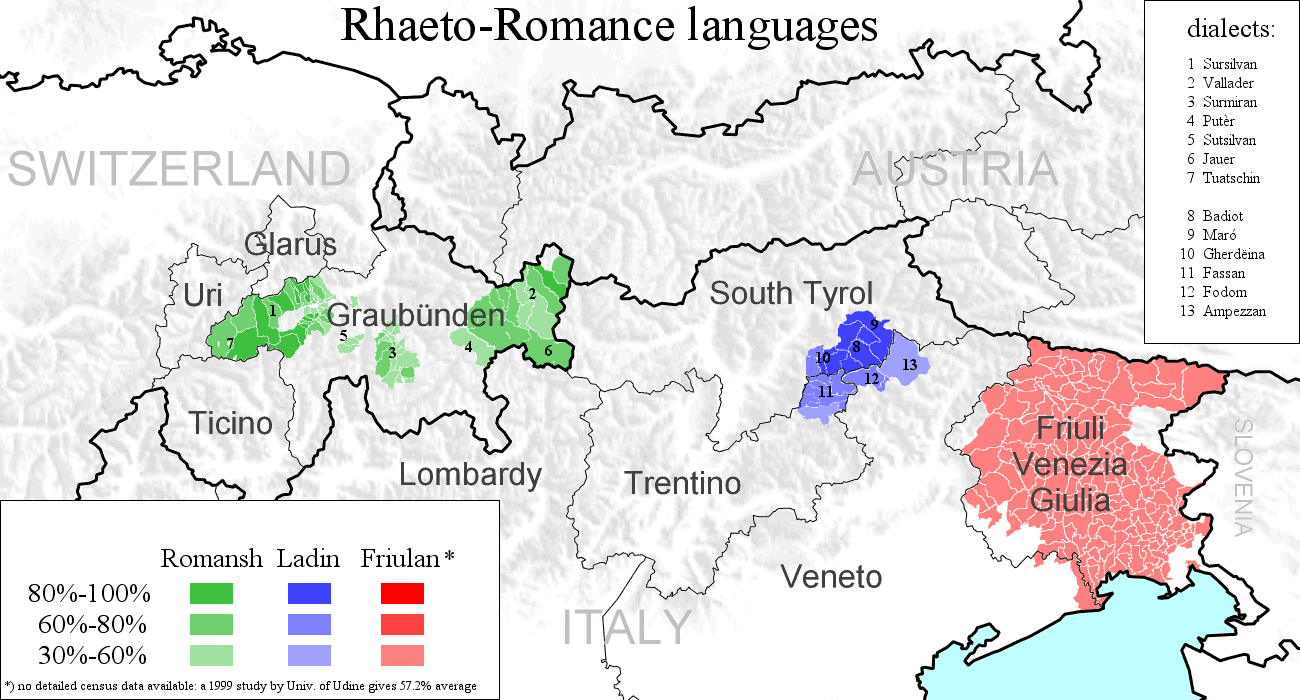
The three proposed Rhaeto-Romance languages: Romansh, Ladin, and Friulan

Whether or not Romansh, Friulan, and Ladin should compose a separate "Rhaeto-Romance" subgroup within Gallo-Romance is an unresolved issue, known as the Questione Ladina. Some linguists posit that these languages are descended from a common language, which was fractured geographically through the spread of German and Italian. The Italian linguist Graziadio Isaia Ascoli first made the claim in 1873. The other position holds that any similarities between these three languages can be explained through their relative geographic isolation, which shielded them from certain linguistic changes. By contrast, the Gallo-Italic varieties of Northern Italy were more open to linguistic influences from the South. Linguists who take this position often point out that the similarities between the languages are comparatively few. This position was first introduced by the Italian dialectologist Carlo Battisti.

This linguistic dispute became politically relevant for the Italian irredentist movement. Italian nationalists interpreted Battisti's hypothesis as implying that Romansh, Friulan, and Ladin were not separate Romance languages but rather Italian dialects. They used this hypothesis as an argument to claim the territories for Italy where these languages were spoken. From a sociolinguistic perspective, however, this question is largely irrelevant. The speakers of Romansh have always identified as speaking a language distinct from both Italian and other Romance varieties. Furthermore, unlike Friulian, Ladin, or Lombard, Romansh is located north of the German-Italian linguistic border, and German has influenced the language much more than Italian has.

== Dialects ==
Explanatory video: How did the Romansh idioms come about? (105 sec., with English subtitles)

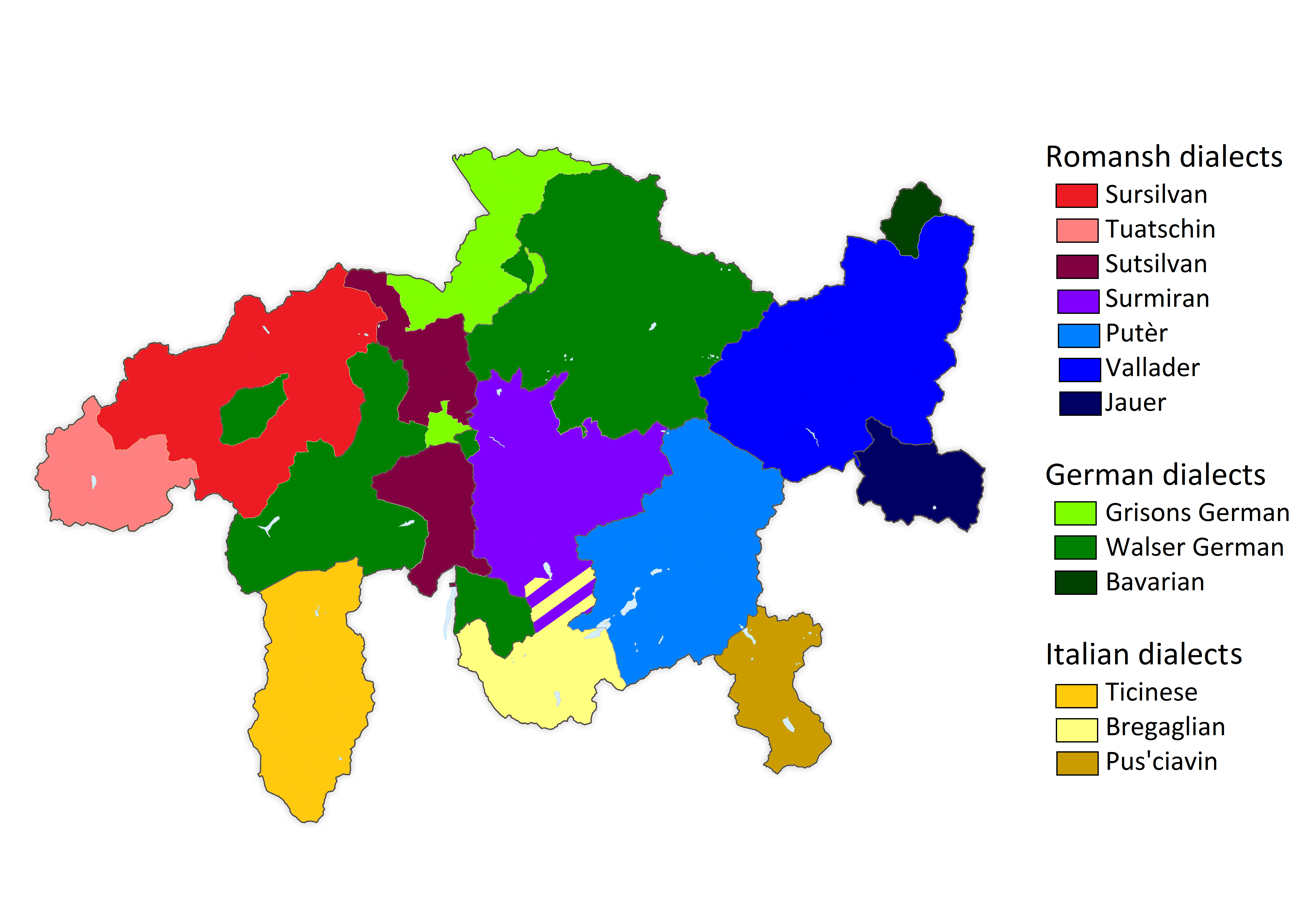
Historical distribution of the dialects of Romansh, German, and Italian in the Grisons. So-called "Italian dialects" are in fact dialects of Lombard, and more similar to Romansh than to Italian: Sursilvan Tuatschin Sutsilvan Surmiran Putèr Vallader Jauer

Romansh comprises a group of closely related dialects, which are most commonly divided into five different varieties, each of which has developed a standardized form. These regional standards are referred to as idioms in Romansh to distinguish them from the local vernaculars, which are referred to as dialects. These dialects form a dialect continuum without clear-cut divisions. Historically a continuous speech area, this continuum has now been ruptured by the spread of German, so that Romansh is now geographically divided into at least two non-adjacent parts.

1. Sursilvan (Sursilvan: sursilvan; derived from the name of the Surselva region, which itself is derived from sur "above" and selva "forest") – spoken in the Vorderrhein (Sursilvan: Rein Anteriur) valley, including the Lumnezia, Foppa, and Cadi. It is the most widely spoken variety, with 17,897 people or 54.8% within its historical region (including Imboden/Plaun, where Sursilvan is written but Sutsilvan spoken, with the exception of Sursilvan-speaking Flims/Flem) naming Romansh as a habitually spoken language in the Swiss census of 2000.
2. Sutsilvan (Sutsilvan, Rumantsch Grischun: sutsilvan; Vallader: suotsilvan; Putèr: suotsilvaun; derived from sut "below" and selva "forest") – spoken in the Hinterrhein (Sutsilvan: Ragn Posteriur) valley, including Schams/Schons, Domleschg/Tumleastga, and Heinzenberg/Mantogna. In Imboden/Plaun, with the exception of Sursilvan-speaking Flims/Flem, they speak Sutsilvan but write Sursilvan. Sutsilvan is the least widely spoken Romansh variety, with 1,111 people or 15.4% within its historical area (excluding Imboden/Plaun) naming Romansh as a habitually spoken language. It has become extinct across much of its historical area since the turn of the 20th century.
3. Surmiran (Surmiran: surmiran; derived from sur "above" and meir "wall") – spoken in the Gelgia and Albula/Alvra valleys, including Surses and Sutses. Romansh was named by 3,038 people within the historically Surmiran-writing area (44%) as a habitually spoken language in the census of 2000.
4. Putèr (Romansh: puter; probably originally a nickname derived from put "porridge", meaning "porridge-eaters") – spoken in the Upper Engadine (Putèr and Vallader: Engiadin'Ota), as well as in the village of Brail in Zernez, where they, however, write Vallader. Romansh was named by 5,497 people or 30% within the Upper Engadine and Bergün Filisur (where Putèr is written but a non-Putèr dialect is spoken) as a habitually spoken language in the census of 2000.
5. Vallader (Vallader: vallader; derived from val "valley") – spoken in the Lower Engadine (Vallader and Putèr: Engiadina Bassa), with the exception of Putèr-speaking Brail – where they nevertheless write Vallader – and in the Val Müstair. It is the second most commonly spoken variety of Romansh, with 6,448 people in the Lower Engadine and Val Müstair (79.2%) naming Romansh as a habitually spoken language in the census of 2000.

Aside from these five major dialects, two additional varieties are often distinguished. One is the dialect of the Val Müstair, which is closely related to Vallader but often separately referred to as Jauer (Romansh: jauer; derived from the personal pronoun jau "I", i.e. "the jau-sayers"). Less commonly distinguished is the dialect of Tujetsch and the Val Medel, which is markedly different from Sursilvan and is referred to as Tuatschin.

Additionally, the standardized variety Rumantsch Grischun, intended for pan-regional use, was introduced in 1982. The dialect of the Val Bregaglia is usually considered a variety of Lombard, and speakers use Italian as their written language, even though the dialect shares many features with the neighboring Putèr dialect of Romansh.

As these varieties form a continuum with small transitions from each village to the next, there is no straightforward internal grouping of the Romansh dialects. The Romansh language area can be described best as consisting of two widely divergent varieties, Sursilvan in the west and the dialects of the Engadine in the east, with Sutsilvan and Surmiran forming a transition zone between them. The Engadinese varieties Putèr and Vallader are often referred to as one specific variety known as Ladin (Ladin, Sursilvan, Surmiran, and Rumantsch Grischun: ladin; Sutsilvan: ladegn), which is not to be confused with the closely related language in Italy's Dolomite mountains also known as Ladin. Sutsilvan and Surmiran are sometimes grouped together as Central Romansh (rm. Grischun central), and then grouped together with Sursilvan as "Rhenish Romansh" (in German, "Rheinischromanisch").

One feature that separates the Rhenish varieties from Ladin is the retention of the rounded front vowels /y/ and /ø/ (written ü and ö) in Ladin, which have been unrounded in the other dialects, as in Ladin mür, Sursilvan mir, Surmiran meir "wall" or Ladin chaschöl to Rhenish caschiel "cheese". Another is the development of Latin -CT-, which has developed into /tɕ/ in the Rhenish varieties as in détg "said" or fatg "did", while developing into /t/ in Ladin (dit and fat). A feature separating Sursilvan from Central Romansh, however, involves the extent of palatalization of Latin /k/ in front of /a/, which is rare in Sursilvan but common in the other varieties: Sursilvan casa, Sutsilvan tgea, Surmiran tgesa, Putèr chesa, and Vallader chasa "house". Overall, however, the Central Romansh varieties do not share many unique features, but rather connect Sursilvan and Ladin through a succession of numerous small differences from one village to the next.

The dialects of Romansh are not always mutually comprehensible. Speakers of Sursilvan and Ladin, in particular, are usually unable to understand each other initially. Because speakers usually identify themselves primarily with their regional dialect, many do not take the effort to attempt to understand unfamiliar dialects, and prefer to speak Swiss German with speakers of other varieties. A common Romansh identity is not widespread outside intellectual circles, even though this has been changing among the younger generation.

== History ==
=== Origins and development until modern times ===
Romansh originates from the spoken Latin brought to the region by Roman soldiers, merchants, and officials following the conquest of the modern-day Grisons area by the Romans in 15 BC. Before that, the inhabitants spoke Celtic and Raetic languages, with Raetic apparently being spoken mainly in the Lower Engadine valley. Traces of these languages survive mainly in toponyms, including village names such as Tschlin, Scuol, Savognin, Glion, Breil/Brigels, Brienz/Brinzauls, Purtenza, and Trun. Additionally, a small number of pre-Latin words have survived in Romansh, mainly concerning animals, plants, and geological features unique to the Alps, such as camutsch "chamois" and grava "scree".

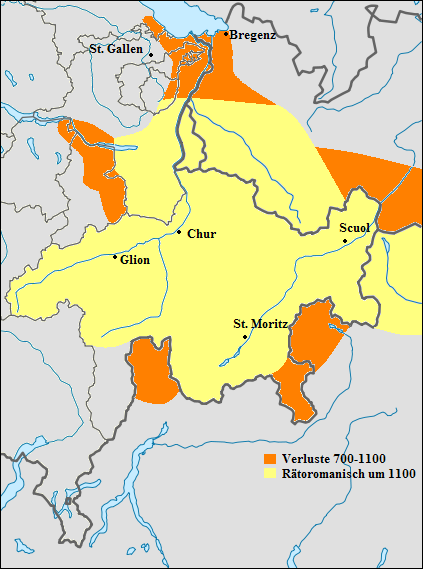
Romansh during the Early Middle Ages lost to German and Lombard, 700–1100 Romansh-speaking area, c. 1100

It is unknown how rapidly the Celtic and Raetic inhabitants were Romanized following the conquest of Raetia. Some linguists assume that the area was rapidly Romanized following the Roman conquest, whereas others think that this process did not end until the 4th or 5th century, when more thoroughly Romanized Celts from farther north fled south to avoid invasions by Germanic tribes. The process was certainly complete and the pre-Roman languages extinct by the 5th–6th century, when Raetia became part of the Ostrogothic Kingdom. Around 537 AD, the Ostrogoths handed over the province of Raetia Prima to the Frankish Empire, which continued to have local rulers administering the so-called Duchy of Chur. However, after the death of the last Victorid ruler, Bishop Tello, around 765 AD, Charlemagne assigned a Germanic duke to administer the region. Additionally, the Diocese of Chur was transferred by the (pre-Schism) Roman Catholic Church from the Archdiocese of Milan to the Diocese of Mainz in 843 AD. The combined effect was a cultural reorientation towards the German-speaking north, especially as the ruling élite now comprised almost entirely speakers of German.

At the time, Romansh was spoken over a much wider area, stretching north into the present-day cantons of Glarus and St. Gallen, to the Walensee in the northwest, and Rüthi and the Alpine Rhine Valley in the northeast. In the east, parts of modern-day Vorarlberg were Romansh-speaking, as were parts of Tyrol. The northern areas, called Lower Raetia, became German-speaking by the 12th century; and by the 15th century, the Rhine Valley of St. Gallen and the areas around the Walensee were entirely German-speaking. This language shift was a long, drawn-out process, with larger, central towns adopting German first, while the more peripheral areas around them remained Romansh-speaking longer. The shift to German was caused in particular by the influence of the local German-speaking élites and by German-speaking immigrants from the north, with the lower and rural classes retaining Romansh longer.

In addition, beginning around 1270, the German-speaking Walser began settling in sparsely populated or uninhabited areas within the Romansh-speaking heartland. The Walser sometimes expanded into Romansh-speaking areas from their original settlements, which then often became German-speaking, such as Davos, Schanfigg, the Prättigau, Schams, and Valendas, which became German-speaking by the 14th century. In rare cases, these Walser settlements were eventually assimilated by their Romansh-speaking neighbors; for instance, Surses, Medel, and Tujetsch in the Surselva region.

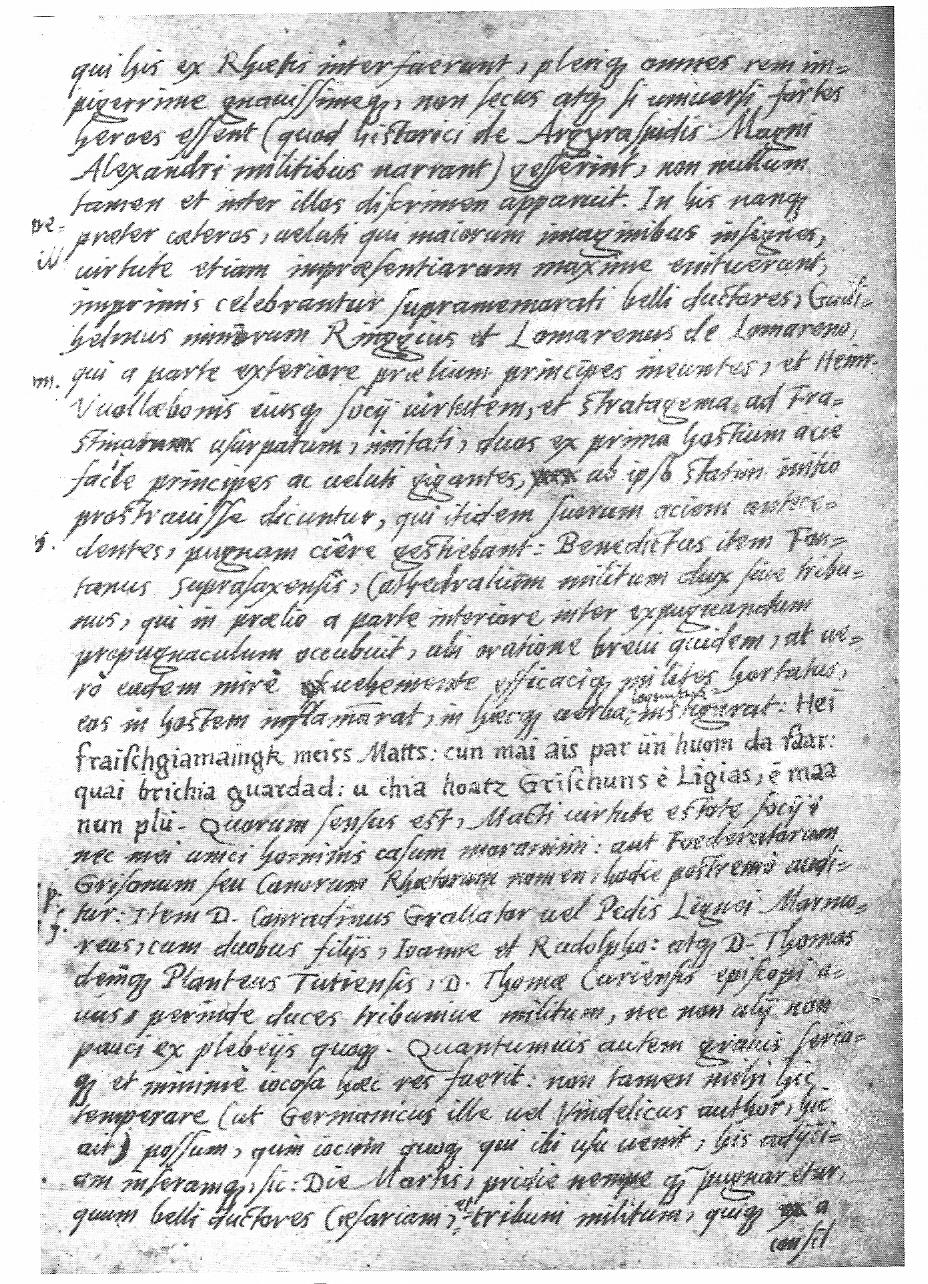
"La mort da Benedetg Fontana", a Romansh passage in a Latin chronicle by Durich Chiampel

The Germanization of Chur had particularly long-term consequences. Even though the city had long before ceased to be a cultural center of Romansh, the spoken language of the capital of the Diocese of Chur continued to be Romansh until the 15th century. After a fire in 1465 which virtually destroyed the city, many German-speaking artisans who had been called in to help repair the damage settled there, causing German to become the majority language. In a chronicle written in 1571–72, Durich Chiampell mentions that Romansh was still spoken in Chur roughly a hundred years before, but had since then rapidly given way to German and was now not much appreciated by the inhabitants of the city. Many linguists regard the loss of Chur to German as a crucial event. According to Sylvia Osswald, for example, it occurred precisely at a time when the introduction of the printing press could have led to the adoption of the Romansh dialect of the capital as a common written language for all Romansh speakers. Other linguists such as Jachen Curdin Arquint remain skeptical of this view, however, and assume that the various Romansh-speaking regions would still have developed their own separate written standards.

Instead, several regional written varieties of Romansh began appearing during the 16th century. Gian Travers wrote the first surviving work in Romansh, the Chianzun dalla guerra dagl Chiaste da Müs, in the Putèr dialect. This epic poem, written in 1527, describes the first Musso war, in which Travers himself had taken part. Travers also translated numerous biblical plays into Romansh, though only the titles survive for many of them. Another early writer, Giachem Bifrun, who also wrote in Putèr, penned the first printed book in Romansh, a catechism published in 1552. In 1560 he published a translation of the New Testament: L'g Nuof Sainc Testamaint da nos Signer Jesu Christ.

Two years later, in 1562, another writer from the Engadine, Durich Chiampel, published the Cudesch da Psalms, a collection of church songs in the Vallader dialect. These early works are generally well written and show that the authors had a large amount of Romansh vocabulary at their disposal, contrary to what one might expect of the first pieces of writing in a language. Because of this, the linguist Ricarda Liver assumes that these written works built on an earlier, pre-literature tradition of using Romansh in administrative and legal situations, of which no evidence survives. In their prefaces, the authors themselves often mention the novelty of writing Romansh, and discuss an apparently common prejudice that Romansh was a language that could not be written.

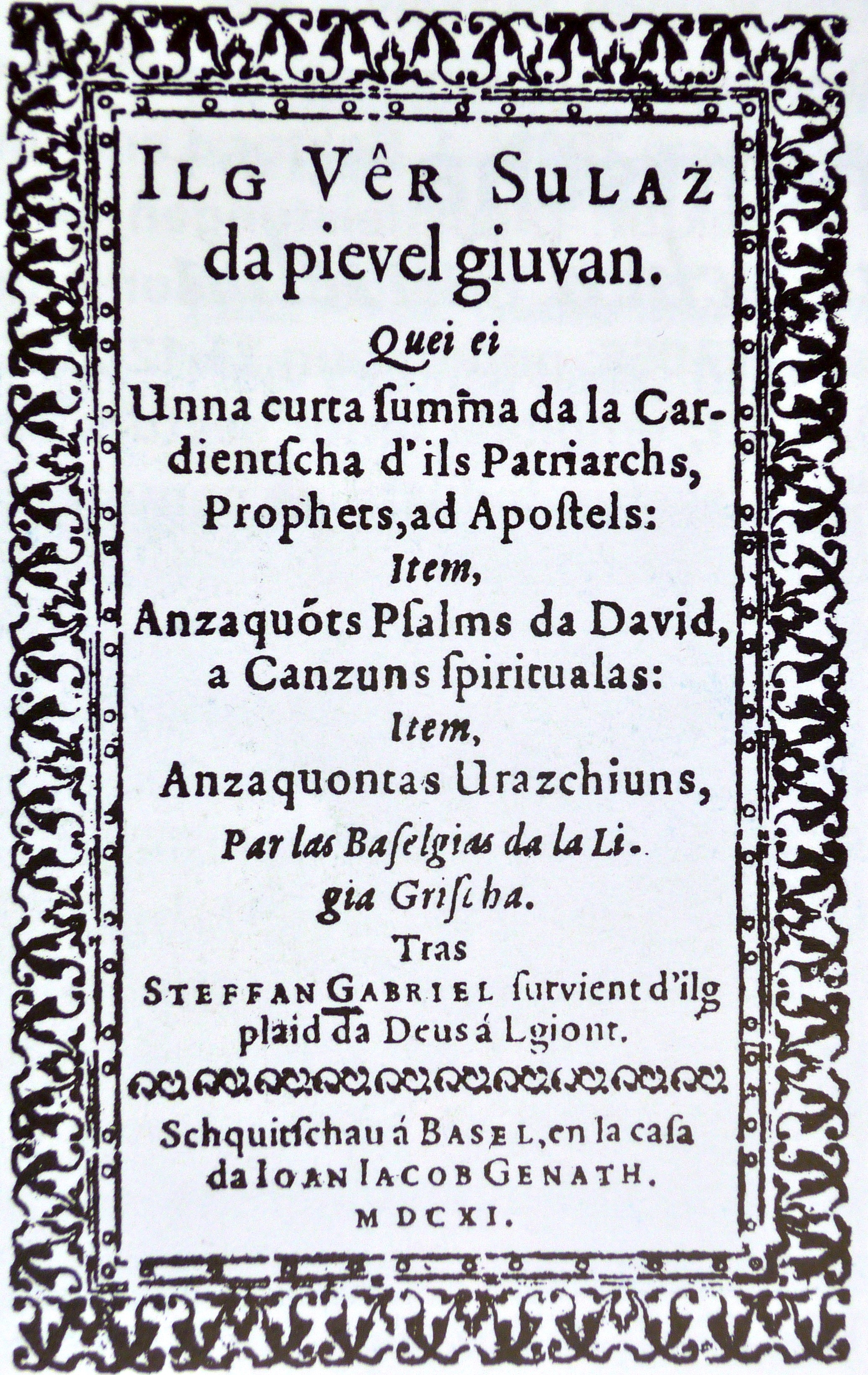
Front page of Ilg Vêr Sulaz da pievel giuvan

The first writing in the Sursilvan and Sutsilvan dialects appears in the 17th century. As in the Engadine, these early works usually focused on religious themes, in particular the struggles between Protestants and Counter-Reformers. Daniel Bonifaci produced the first surviving work in this category, the catechism Curt mussameint dels principals punctgs della Christianevla Religiun, published in 1601 in the Sutsilvan dialect. A second edition, published in 1615, is closer to Sursilvan, however, and writings in Sutsilvan do not appear again until the 20th century. In 1611, Igl Vêr Sulaz da pievel giuvan ("The true joys of young people"), a series of religious instructions for Protestant youths, was published by Steffan Gabriel. Four years later, in 1615, a Catholic catechism, Curt Mussament, was published in response, written by Gion Antoni Calvenzano. The first translation of the New Testament into Sursilvan was published in 1648 by the son of Steffan Gabriel, Luci Gabriel.

The first complete translation of the Bible, the Bibla da Cuera, was published between 1717 and 1719. The Sursilvan dialect thus had two separate written varieties, one used by the Protestants with its cultural center around Ilanz, and a Catholic variety with the Disentis Abbey as its center. The Engadine dialect was also written in two varieties: Putèr in the Upper Valley and Vallader in the Lower Valley. The Sutsilvan areas either used the Protestant variety of Sursilvan, or simply used German as their main written language. The Surmiran region began developing its own variety in the early 18th century, with a catechism being published in 1703, though either the Catholic variety of Sursilvan or Putèr was more commonly used there until the 20th century.

In the 16th century, the language border between Romansh and German largely stabilized, and it remained almost unchanged until the late 19th century. During this period, only isolated areas became German-speaking, mainly a few villages around Thusis and the village of Samnaun. In the case of Samnaun, the inhabitants adopted the Bavarian dialect of neighboring Tyrol, making Samnaun the only municipality of Switzerland where a Bavarian dialect is spoken. The Vinschgau in South Tyrol was still Romansh-speaking in the 17th century, after which it became entirely German-speaking because of the Counter-Reformation denunciation of Romansh as a "Protestant language".

=== Romansh during the 19th and 20th centuries ===
With the Act of Mediation, the Grisons became a canton of Switzerland in 1803. The constitution of the canton dates from 1892. When the Grisons became part of Switzerland in 1803, it had a population of roughly 73,000, of whom around 36,600 were Romansh speakers—many of them monolingual—living mostly within the Romansh-speaking valleys. The language border with German, which had mostly been stable since the 16th century, now began moving again as more and more villages shifted to German. One cause was the admission of Grisons as a Swiss canton, which brought Romansh-speakers into more frequent contact with German-speakers. Another factor was the increased power of the central government of the Grisons, which had always used German as its administrative language. In addition, many Romansh-speakers migrated to the larger cities, which were German-speaking, while speakers of German settled in Romansh villages. Moreover, economic changes meant that the Romansh-speaking villages, which had mostly been self-sufficient, engaged in more frequent commerce with German-speaking regions. Also, improvements in the infrastructure made travel and contact with other regions much easier than it had been.

Finally, the rise of tourism made knowledge of German an economic necessity in many areas, while the agricultural sector, which had been a traditional domain of Romansh, became less important. All this meant that knowledge of German became more and more of a necessity for Romansh speakers and that German became more and more a part of daily life. For the most part, German was seen not as a threat but rather as an important asset for communicating outside one's home region. The common people frequently demanded better access to learning German. When public schools began to appear, many municipalities decided to adopt German as the medium of instruction, as in the case of Ilanz, where German became the language of schooling in 1833, when the town was still largely Romansh-speaking.

Some people even welcomed the disappearance of Romansh, in particular among progressives. In their eyes, Romansh was an obstacle to the economic and intellectual development of the Romansh people. For instance, the priest Heinrich Bansi from Ardez wrote in 1797: "The biggest obstacle to the moral and economical improvement of these regions is the language of the people, Ladin [...] The German language could certainly be introduced with ease into the Engadine, as soon as one could convince the people of the immense advantages of it". Others, however, saw Romansh as an economic asset, since it gave the Romansh an advantage when learning other Romance languages. In 1807, for example, the priest Mattli Conrad wrote an article listing the advantages and disadvantages of Romansh:

The Romansh language is an immense advantage in learning so much more rapidly the languages derived from Latin of France, Italy, Spain etc, as can be seen with the Romansh youth, which travels to these countries and learns their language with ease. [...] We live in between an Italian and a German people. How practical is it, when one can learn the languages of both without effort?

— Mattli Conrad – 1807

In response, the editor of the newspaper added that:

According to the testimony of experienced and vigilant language teachers, while the one who is born Romansh can easily learn to understand these languages and make himself understood in them, he has great difficulties in learning them properly, since precisely because of the similarity, he mixes them so easily with his own bastardized language. [...] in any case, the conveniences named should hold no weight against all the disadvantages that come from such an isolated and uneducated language.

According to Mathias Kundert, this quote is a good example of the attitude of many German-speakers towards Romansh at the time. According to Mathias Kundert, while there was never a plan to Germanize the Romansh areas of Grisons, many German-speaking groups wished that the entire canton would become German-speaking. They were careful, however, to avoid any drastic measures to that extent, in order not to antagonize the influential Romansh minority.

The decline of Romansh over the 20th century can be seen through the results of the Swiss censuses. The decline in percentages is only partially due to the Germanization of Romansh areas, since the Romansh-speaking valleys always had a lower overall population growth than other parts of the canton.

Number of Romansh speakers in the Grisons 1803–1980
year	Romansh (absolute number)	Romansh %	German %	Italian %
1803	36,700	c. 50%	c. 36%	c. 14%
1850	42,439	47.2%	39.5%	13.3%
1880	37,794	39.8%	46.0%	13.7%
1900	36,472	34.9%	46.7%	16.8%
1920	39,127	32.7%	51.2%	14.8%
1941	40,187	31.3%	54.9%	12.8%
1960	38,414	26.1%	56.7%	16.1%
1980	36,017	21.9%	59.9%	13.5%

Starting in the mid-19th century, however, a revival movement began, often called the "Rhaeto-Romansh renaissance". This movement involved an increased cultural activity, as well as the foundation of several organizations dedicated to protecting the Romansh language. In 1863, the first of several attempts was made to found an association for all Romansh regions, which eventually led to the foundation of the Società Retorumantscha in 1885. In 1919, the Lia Rumantscha was founded to serve as an umbrella organization for the various regional language societies. Additionally, the role of Romansh in schooling was strengthened, with the first Romansh school books being published in the 1830s and 1840s. Initially, these were merely translations of the German editions, but by the end of the 19th century teaching materials were introduced which took the local Romansh culture into consideration. Additionally, Romansh was introduced as a subject in teacher's college in 1860 and was recognized as an official language by the canton in 1880.

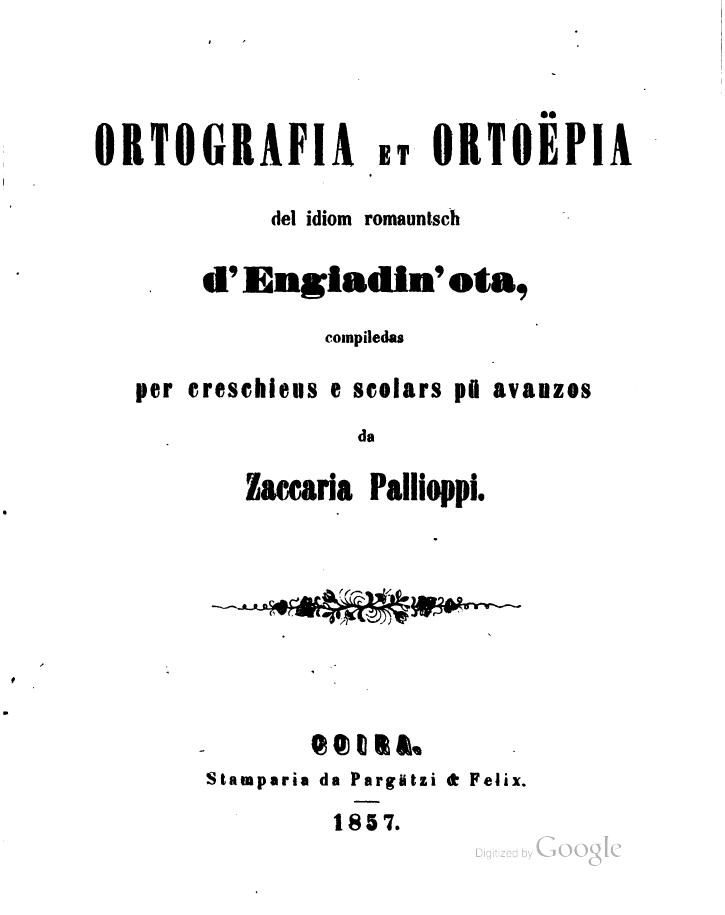
Cover page of Ortografia et ortoëpia del idiom romauntsch d'Engiadin'ota

Around the same time, grammar and spelling guidelines began to be developed for the regional written dialects. One of the earliest was the Ortografia et ortoëpia del idiom romauntsch d'Engiadin'ota by Zaccaria Pallioppi, published in 1857. For Sursilvan, a first attempt to standardize the written language was the Ortografia gienerala, speculativa ramontscha by Baseli Carigiet, published in 1858, followed by a Sursilvan-German dictionary in 1882, and the Normas ortografias by Giachen Caspar Muoth in 1888. Neither of these guidelines managed to gather much support. At the same time, the Canton published school books in its own variety. Sursilvan was then definitely standardized through the works of Gion Cahannes, who published Grammatica Romontscha per Surselva e Sutselva in 1924, followed by Entruidament devart nossa ortografia in 1927. The Surmiran dialect had its own norms established in 1903, when the Canton agreed to finance the school book Codesch da lectura per las scolas primaras de Surmeir, though a definite guideline, the Normas ortograficas per igl rumantsch da Surmeir, was not published until 1939. In the meantime, the norms of Pallioppi had come under criticism in the Engadine due to the strong influence of Italian in them. This led to an orthographic reform which was concluded by 1928, when the Pitschna introducziun a la nouva ortografia ladina ufficiala by Cristoffel Bardola was published. A separate written variety for Sutsilvan was developed in 1944 by Giuseppe Gangale.

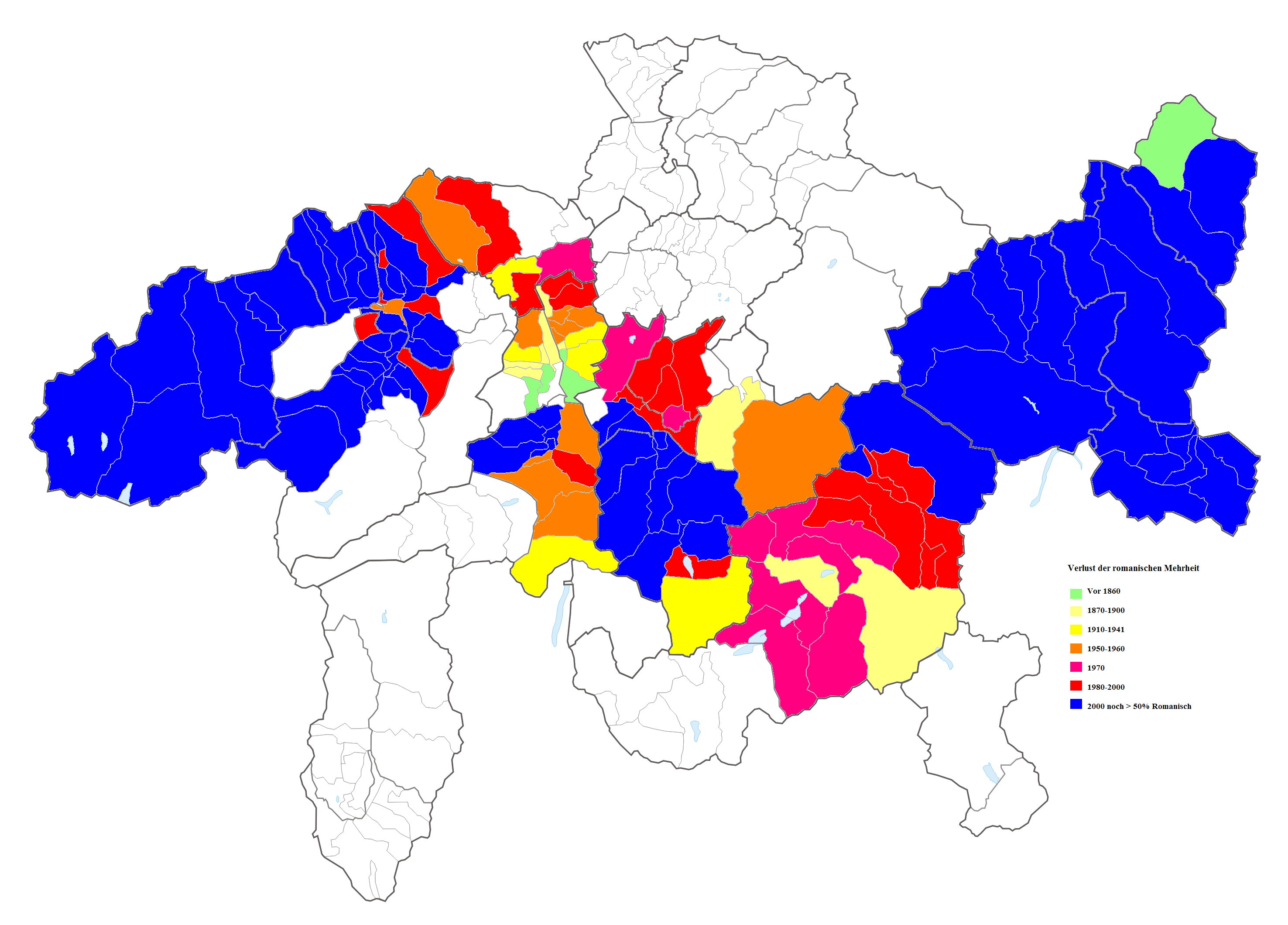
Loss of the Romansh-speaking majority in modern times according to the Swiss censuses before 1860 1870–1900 1910–1941 1950–1960 1970 1980–2000 Romansh majority in 2000

Around 1880, the entire Romansh-speaking area still formed a continuous geographical unit. But by the end of the century, the so-called "Central-Grisons language bridge" began to disappear. From Thusis, which had become German-speaking in the 16th/17th century, the Heinzenberg and Domleschg valleys were gradually Germanized over the next decades. Around the turn of the century, the inner Heinzenberg and Cazis became German-speaking, followed by Rothenbrunnen, Rodels, Almens, and Pratval, splitting the Romansh area into two geographically non-connected parts. In the 1920s and 1930s the rest of the villages in the valley became mainly German-speaking, sealing the split.

In order to halt the decline of Romansh, the Lia Rumantscha began establishing Romansh day care schools, called Scoletas, beginning in the 1940s with the aim of reintroducing Romansh to children. Although the Scoletas had some success – of the ten villages where Scoletas were established, the children began speaking Romansh amongst themselves in four, with the children in four others acquiring at least some knowledge of Romansh – the program ultimately failed to preserve the language in the valley.

A key factor was the disinterest of the parents, whose main motivation for sending their children to the Scoletas appears to have been that they were looked after for a few hours and given a meal every day, rather than an interest in preserving Romansh. The other factor was that after entering primary school, the children received a few hours a week of Romansh instruction at best. As a result, the last Scoletas were closed in the 1960s with the exception of Präz, where the Scoleta remained open until 1979.

In other areas, such as the Engadine and the Surselva, where the pressure of German was equally strong, Romansh was maintained much better and remained a commonly spoken language. According to the linguist Mathias Kundert, one important factor was the different social prestige of Romansh. In the Heinzenberg and Domleschg valleys, the elite had been German-speaking for centuries, so that German was associated with power and education, even though most people did not speak it, whereas Romansh was associated with peasant life. In the Engadine and the Surselva by contrast, the elite was itself Romansh-speaking, so that Romansh there was "not only the language spoken to children and cows, but also that of the village notable, the priest, and the teacher." Additionally, Romansh schools had been common for several years before German had become a necessity, so that Romansh was firmly established as a medium of education. Likewise, in the Upper Engadine, where factors such as increased mobility and immigration by German speakers were even stronger, Romansh was more firmly established as a language of education and administration, so that the language was maintained to a much greater extent. In the Central Grisons, by contrast, German had been a central part of schooling since the beginning, and virtually all schools switched entirely to German as the language of instruction by 1900, with children in many schools being punished for speaking Romansh well into the 1930s.

=== Rumantsch Grischun ===
Early attempts to create a unified written language for Romansh include the Romonsch fusionau of Gion Antoni Bühler in 1867 and the Interrumantsch by Leza Uffer in 1958. Neither was able to gain much support, and their creators were largely the only ones actively using them. In the meantime, the Romansh movement sought to promote the different regional varieties while promoting a gradual convergence of the five varieties, called the "avischinaziun". In 1982, however, the then secretary of the Lia Rumantscha, a sociolinguist named Bernard Cathomas, launched a project for designing a pan-regional variety. The linguist Heinrich Schmid presented to the Lia Rumantscha the same year the rules and directives for this standard language under the name Rumantsch Grischun (Rumantsch Grischun: rumantsch grischun). Schmid's approach consisted of creating a language as equally acceptable as possible to speakers of the different dialects, by choosing those forms which were found in a majority of the three strongest varieties: Sursilvan, Vallader, and Surmiran (Puter has more speakers than Surmiran but is spoken by a lower percentage of the population in its area). The elaboration of the new standard was endorsed by the Swiss National Fund and carried out by a team of young Romansh linguists under the guidance of Georges Darms and Anna-Alice Dazzi-Gross.

The Lia Rumantscha then began introducing Rumantsch Grischun to the public, announcing that it would be chiefly introduced into domains where only German was being used, such as official forms and documents, billboards, and commercials. In 1984, the assembly of delegates of the head organization Lia Rumantscha decided to use the new standard language when addressing all Romansh-speaking areas of the Grisons. From the very start, Rumansh Grischun has been implemented only on the basis of a decision of the particular institutions. In 1986, the federal administration began to use Rumantsch Grischun for single texts. The same year, however, several influential figures began to criticize the introduction of Rumantsch Grischun. Donat Cadruvi, at the time the president of the cantonal government, claimed that the Lia Rumantscha was trying to force the issue. Romansh writer Theo Candinas also called for a public debate on the issue, calling Rumantsch Grischun a "plague" and "death blow" to Romansh and its introduction a "Romansh Kristallnacht", thus launching a highly emotional and bitter debate which would continue for several years. The following year, Candinas published another article titled Rubadurs Garmadis in which he compared the proponents of Rumantsch Grischun to Nazi thugs raiding a Romansh village and desecrating, destroying, and burning the Romansh cultural heritage.

The proponents responded by labeling the opponents as a small group of archconservative and narrow-minded Sursilvans and CVP politicians among other things. The debate was characterized by a heavy use of metaphors, with opponents describing Rumantsch Grischun as a "test-tube baby" or "castrated language". They argued that it was an artificial and infertile creation which lacked a heart and soul, in contrast to the traditional dialects. On the other side, proponents called on the Romansh people to nurture the "new-born" to allow it to grow, with Romansh writer Ursicin Derungs calling Rumantsch Grischun a "lungatg virginal" "virgin language" that now had to be seduced and turned into a blossoming woman.

The opposition to Rumantsch Grischun also became clear in the Swiss census of 1990, in which certain municipalities refused to distribute questionnaires in Rumantsch Grischun, requesting the German version instead. Following a survey on the opinion of the Romansh population on the issue, the government of the Grisons decided in 1996 that Rumantsch Grischun would be used when addressing all Romansh speakers, but the regional varieties could continue to be used when addressing a single region or municipality. In schools, Rumantsch Grischun was not to replace the regional dialects but only be taught passively.

The compromise was largely accepted by both sides. A further recommendation in 1999, known as the "Haltinger concept", also proposed that the regional varieties should remain the basis of the Romansh schools, with Rumantsch Grischun being introduced in middle school and secondary school.

The government of the Grisons then took steps to strengthen the role of Rumantsch Grischun as an official language. Since the cantonal constitution explicitly named Sursilvan and Engadinese as the languages of ballots, a referendum was launched to amend the relevant article. In the referendum, which took place on June 10, 2001, 65% voted in favor of naming Rumantsch Grischun the only official Romansh variety of the Canton. Opponents of Rumantsch Grischun such as Renata Coray and Matthias Grünert argue, however, that if only those municipalities with at least 30% Romansh speakers were considered, the referendum would have been rejected by 51%, with an even larger margin if only those with at least 50% Romansh speakers were considered. They thus interpret the results as the Romansh minority having been overruled by the German-speaking majority of the canton.

A major change in policy came in 2003, when the cantonal government proposed a number of spending cuts, including a proposal according to which new Romansh teaching materials would not be published except in Rumantsch Grischun from 2006 onwards, the logical result of which would be to abolish the regional varieties as languages of instruction. The cantonal parliament passed the measure in August 2003, even advancing the deadline to 2005. The decision was met by strong opposition, in particular in the Engadine, where teachers collected over 4,300 signatures opposing the measure, followed by a second petition signed by around 180 Romansh writers and cultural figures, including many who were supportive of Rumantsch Grischun but opposed its introduction as a language of instruction.

Opponents argued that Romansh culture and identity was transmitted through the regional varieties and not through Rumantsch Grischun and that Rumantsch Grischun would serve to weaken rather than strengthen Romansh, possibly leading to a switch to German-language schools and a swift Germanization of Romansh areas.

The cantonal government refused to debate the issue again, instead deciding on a three-step plan in December 2004 to introduce Rumantsch Grischun as the language of schooling, allowing the municipalities to choose when they would make the switch. The decision not to publish any new teaching materials in the regional varieties was not overturned at this point, however, raising the question of what would happen in those municipalities that refused to introduce Rumantsch Grischun at all, since the language of schooling is decided by the municipalities themselves in the Grisons.

The teachers of the Engadine in particular were outraged over the decision, but those in the Surmeir were mostly satisfied. Few opinions were heard from the Surselva, which was interpreted either as support or resignation, depending on the viewpoint of the observer.

In 2007–2008, 23 so called "pioneer-municipalities" (Lantsch/Lenz, Brienz/Brinzauls, Tiefencastel, Alvaschein, Mon, Stierva, Salouf, Cunter, Riom-Parsonz, Savognin, Tinizong-Rona, Mulegns, Sur, Marmorera, Falera, Laax, Trin, Müstair, Santa Maria Val Müstair, Valchava, Fuldera, Tschierv and Lü) introduced Rumantsch Grischun as the language of instruction in 1st grade, followed by an additional 11 (Ilanz, Schnaus, Flond, Schluein, Pitasch, Riein, Sevgein, Castrisch, Surcuolm, Luven and Duvin) the following year and another 6 (Sagogn, Rueun, Siat, Pigniu, Waltensburg/Vuorz and Andiast) in 2009–2010. However, other municipalities, including the entire Engadine valley and most of the Surselva, continued to use their regional variety. The cantonal government aimed to introduce Rumantsch Grischun as the sole language of instruction in Romansh schools by 2020.

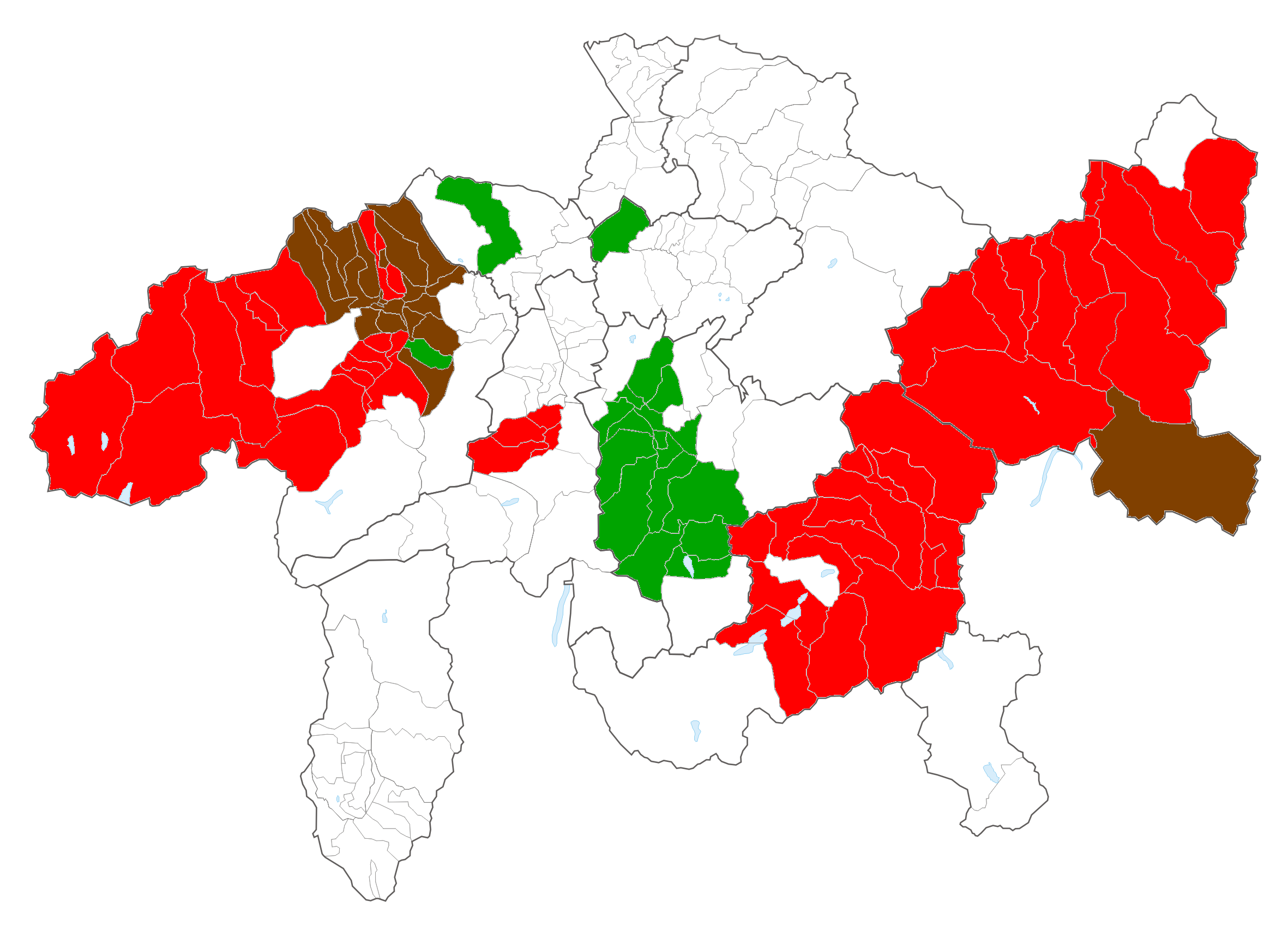
Map of the situation in September 2013 Municipalities that had introduced Rumantsch Grischun as the language of instruction Municipalities that used a regional variety as the language of instruction Municipalities that had introduced Rumantsch Grischun but since decided to revert to a regional variety

In early 2011, a group of opponents in the Surselva and the Engadine founded the association Pro Idioms, demanding the overturning of the government decision of 2003 and launching numerous local initiatives to return to the regional varieties as the language of instruction. In April 2011, Riein became the first municipality to vote to return to teaching in Sursilvan, followed by an additional 4 in December, and a further 10 in early 2012, including Val Müstair (returning to Vallader), which had been the first to introduce Rumantsch Grischun. As of September 2013, all those municipalities in the Surselva which had switched to Rumantsch Grischun had decided to return to teaching in Sursilvan, with the exception of Pitasch, which, followed later.

Supporters of Rumantsch Grischun then announced that they would take the issue to the Federal Supreme Court of Switzerland and announced their intention to launch a cantonal referendum to enshrine Rumantsch Grischun as the language of instruction.

The Lia Rumantscha opposes these moves and now supports a model of coexistence in which Rumantsch Grischun will supplement but not replace the regional varieties in school. It cites the need for keeping linguistic peace among Romansh speakers, as it says that the decades-long debate over the issue has torn friends and even families apart. The canton's 2003 decision not to finance school books in the regional varieties was overturned in December 2011.

Rumantsch Grischun is still a project in progress. At the start of 2014, it was in use as a school language in the central part of the Grisons and in the bilingual classes in the region of Chur. It was taught in upper-secondary schools, in the university of teacher education in Chur and at the universities of Zürich and Fribourg, along with the Romansh idioms. It remains an official and administrative language in the Swiss Confederation and the Canton of the Grisons as well as in public and private institutions for all kinds of texts intended for the whole Romansh-speaking territory.

Until 2021, Surmiran was the only regional variety that was not taught in schools, as all the Surmiran-writing municipalities had switched to Rumantsch Grischun. However, referendums in Surses, Lantsch/Lenz and Albula/Alvra in 2020 led to the return to Surmiran as the language of instruction in the entire Surmiran-writing area, beginning with those pupils who started school in 2021. The only primary schools that will continue teaching in Rumantsch Grischun are the bilingual Romansh/German schools in the cantonal capital of Chur, which is located in a German-speaking area, and in Trin and Domat/Ems, where the local dialects are Sutsilvan but Sursilvan has traditionally been used as the written language.

Rumantsch Grischun is read in the news of Radiotelevisiun Svizra Rumantscha and written in the daily newspaper La Quotidiana, along with the Romansh idioms. Thanks to many new texts in a wide variety of political and social functions, the Romansh vocabulary has been decisively broadened.

The "Pledari Grond" German–Rumantsch Grischun dictionary, with more than 215 000 entries, is the most comprehensive collection of Romansh words, which can also be used in the idioms with the necessary phonetic shifts. The signatories of "Pro Rumantsch" stress that Romansh needs both the idioms and Rumantsch Grischun if it is to improve its chances in today's communication society. There also exist individual dictionaries for each of the different idioms: Sursilvan, Vallader, Puter, Surmiran, and Sutsilvan. As well, the "Pledari Grond" dictionary links to several texts on the grammar of Vallader, Puter, and Rumantsch Grischun.

== Official status in Switzerland and language politics ==
In Switzerland, official language use is governed by the "territorial principle": Cantonal law determines which of the four national languages enjoys official status in which part of the territory. Only the federal administration is officially quadrilingual. Romansh is an official language at the federal level, one of the three official languages of the Canton of the Grisons, and is a working language in various districts and numerous municipalities within the canton.

=== Official status at the federal level ===
The first Swiss constitution of 1848, as well as the subsequent revision of 1872, made no mention of Romansh, which at the time was not a working language of the Canton of the Grisons either. The federal government did finance a translation of the constitution into the two Romansh varieties Sursilvan and Vallader in 1872, noting, however, that these did not carry the force of law. Romansh became a national language of Switzerland in 1938, following a referendum. A distinction was introduced between "national languages" and "official languages". The status of a national language was largely symbolic, whereas only official languages were to be used in official documents, a status reserved for German, French, and Italian. The recognition of Romansh as the fourth national language is best seen within the context of the "Spiritual defence" preceding World War II, which aimed to underline the special status of Switzerland as a multinational country. Additionally, this was supposed to discredit the efforts of Italian nationalists to claim Romansh as a dialect of Italian and establish a claim to parts of the Grisons. The Romansh language movement led by the Lia Rumantscha was mostly satisfied with the status as a national but not official language. Their aims at the time were to secure a symbolic "right of residence" for Romansh, and not actual use in official documents.

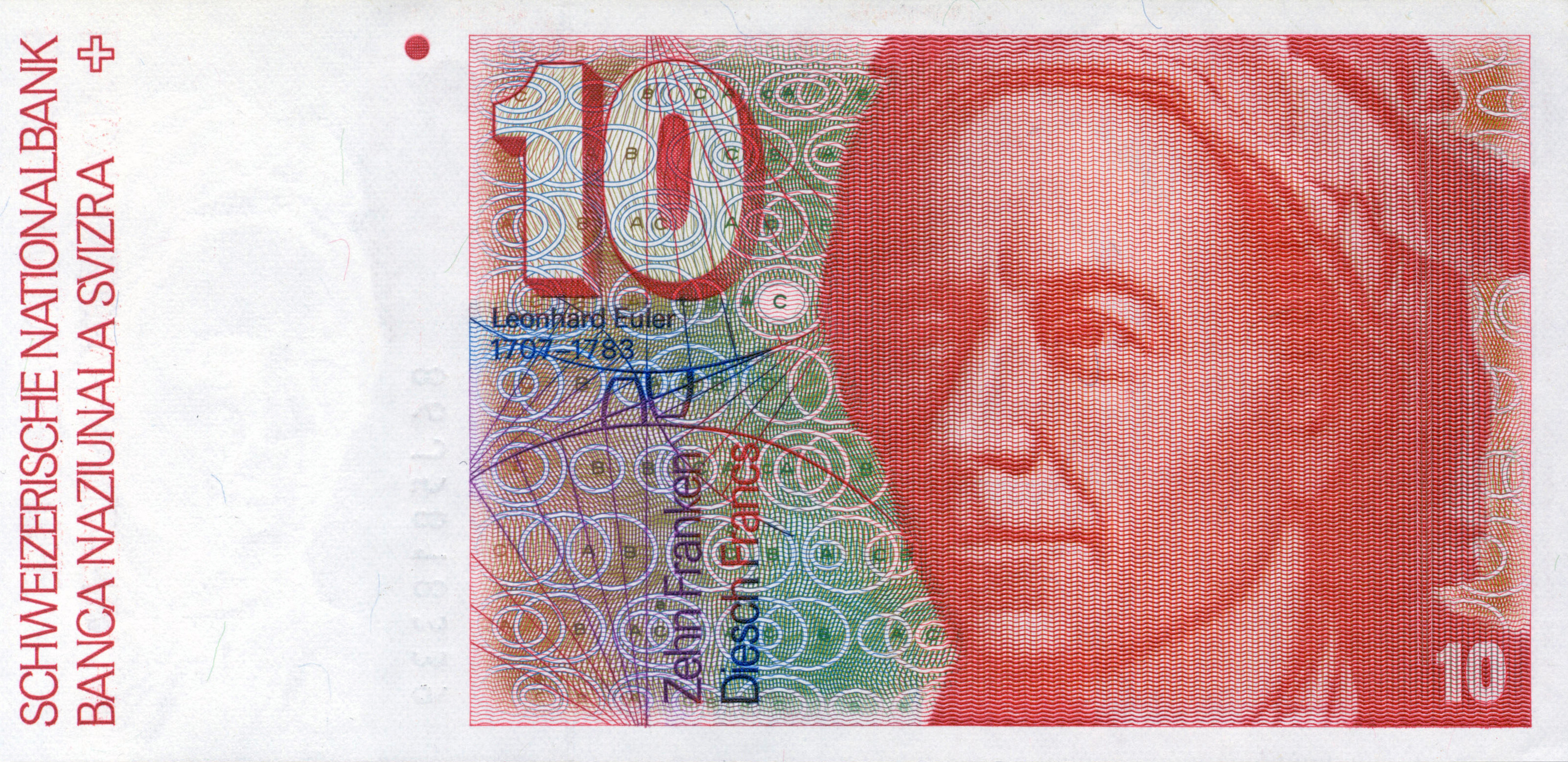
A 6th-series 10-Swiss franc bill, the first to include Romansh

This status did have disadvantages. For instance, official name registers and property titles had to be in German, French, or Italian. This meant that Romansh-speaking parents were often forced to register their children under German or Italian versions of their Romansh names. As late as 1984, the Canton of the Grisons was ordered not to make entries into its corporate registry in Romansh. The Swiss National Bank first planned to include Romansh on its bills in 1956, when a new series was introduced. Due to disputes within the Lia Rumantscha over whether the bills were to feature the Sursilvan version "Banca nazionala svizra" or the Vallader version "Banca naziunala svizzra", the bills eventually featured the Italian version twice, alongside French and German. When new bills were again introduced in 1976/77, a Romansh version was added by finding a compromise between the two largest varieties Sursilvan and Vallader, which read "Banca naziunala svizra", while the numbers on the bills were printed in Surmiran.

Following a referendum on March 10, 1996, Romansh was recognized as a partial official language of Switzerland alongside German, French, and Italian in article 70 of the federal constitution. According to the article, German, French, Italian, and Romansh are national languages of Switzerland. The official languages are declared to be German, French, and Italian, and Romansh is an official language for correspondence with Romansh-speaking people. This means that in principle, it is possible to address the federal administration in Romansh and receive an answer in the same language. More precisely, under section 2.6.3 of the Federal Act on the National Languages and Understanding between the Linguistic Communities, Romansh speakers may address the administration in any variety of Romansh, though they will receive a response in Rumantsch Grischun.

In what the Federal Culture Office itself admits is "more a placatory and symbolic use" of Romansh, the federal authorities occasionally translate some official texts into Romansh. In general, though, demand for Romansh-language services is low because, according to the Federal Culture Office, Romansh speakers may either dislike the official Rumantsch Grischun idiom or prefer to use German in the first place, as most are perfectly bilingual. Without a unified standard language, the status of an official language of the Swiss Confederation would not have been conferred to Romansh. It takes time and needs to be promoted to get implemented in this new function.

The Swiss Armed Forces attempted to introduce Romansh as an official language of command between 1988 and 1992. Attempts were made to form four entirely Romansh-speaking companies, but these efforts were abandoned in 1992 due to a lack of sufficient Romansh-speaking non-commissioned officers. Official use of Romansh as a language of command was discontinued in 1995 as part of a reform of the Swiss military.

=== Official status in the canton of the Grisons ===
The Grisons is the only canton of Switzerland where Romansh is recognized as an official language. The only working language of the Three Leagues was German until 1794, when the assembly of the leagues declared German, Italian, Sursilvan, and Ladin (Putèr and Vallader) to have equal official standing. No explicit mention of any official language was made in the cantonal constitutions of 1803, 1814, and 1854. The constitution of 1880 declared that "The three languages of the Canton are guaranteed as national languages, without specifying anywhere which three languages are meant. The new cantonal constitution of 2004 recognizes German, Italian, and Romansh as equal national and official languages of the canton. The canton used the Romansh varieties Sursilvan and Vallader up until 1997, when Rumantsch Grischun was added and use of Sursilvan and Vallader was discontinued in 2001.

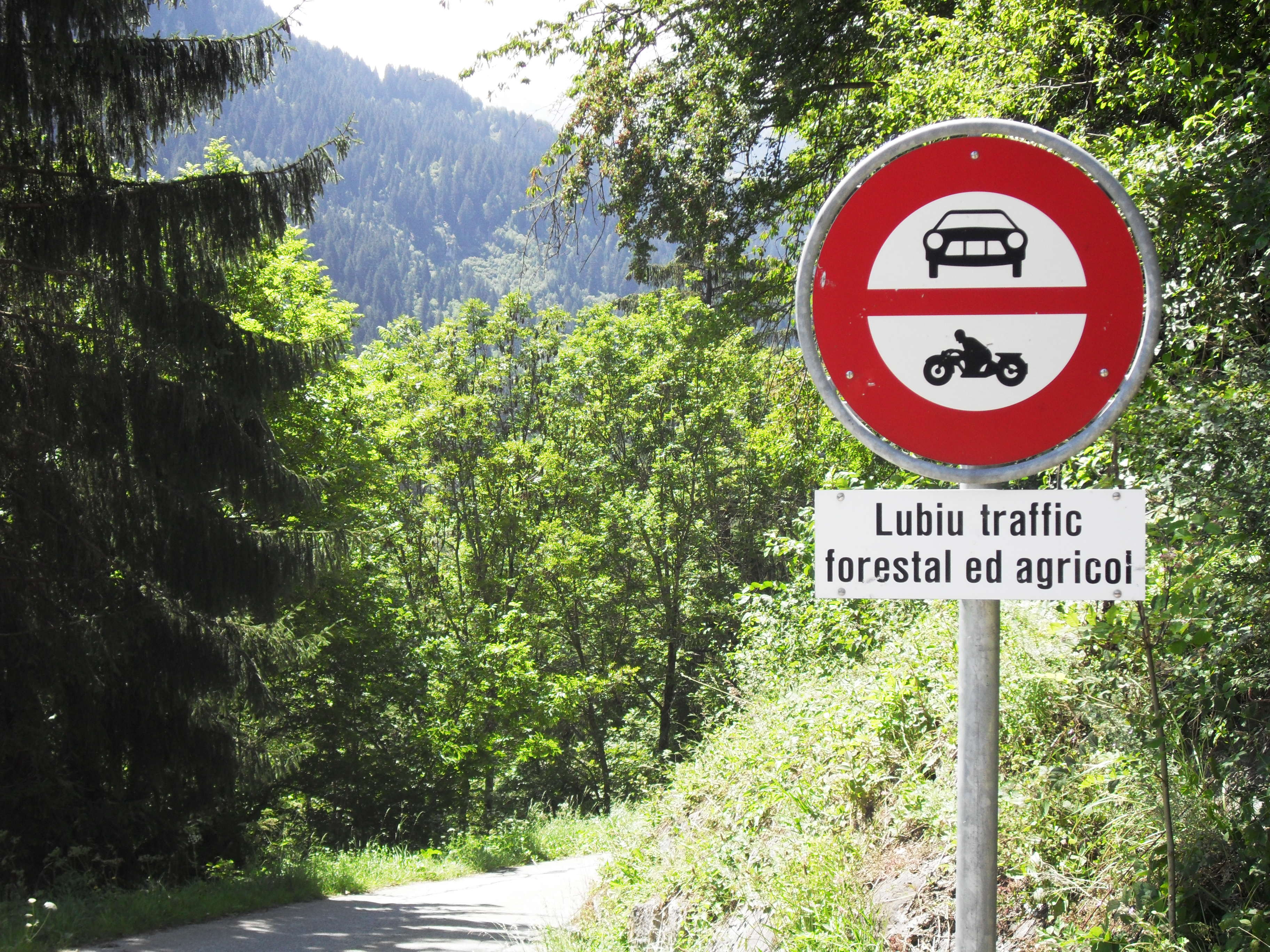
A Romansh-language road sign in Waltensburg/Vuorz

This means that any citizen of the canton may request service and official documents such as ballots in their language of choice, that all three languages may be used in court, and that a member of the cantonal parliament is free to use any of the three languages. Since 1991, all official texts of the cantonal parliament must be translated into Romansh and offices of the cantonal government must include signage in all three languages. In practice, the role of Romansh within the cantonal administration is limited and often symbolic and the working language is mainly German. This is usually justified by cantonal officials on the grounds that all Romansh speakers are perfectly bilingual and able to understand and speak German. Up until the 1980s it was usually seen as a provocation when a deputy in the cantonal parliament used Romansh during a speech.

Cantonal law leaves it to the districts and municipalities to specify their own language of administration and schooling. According to Article 3 of the cantonal constitution, however, the municipalities are to "take into consideration the traditional linguistic composition and respect the autochthonous linguistic minorities". This means that the language area of Romansh has never officially been defined, and that any municipality is free to change its official language. In 2003, Romansh was the sole official language in 56 municipalities of the Grisons, and 19 were bilingual in their administrative business. In practice, even those municipalities which only recognize Romansh as an official working language, readily offer services in German as well. Additionally, since the working language of the canton is mainly German and many official publications of the canton are available only in German, it is virtually impossible for a municipal administration to operate only in Romansh.

=== Romansh in education ===
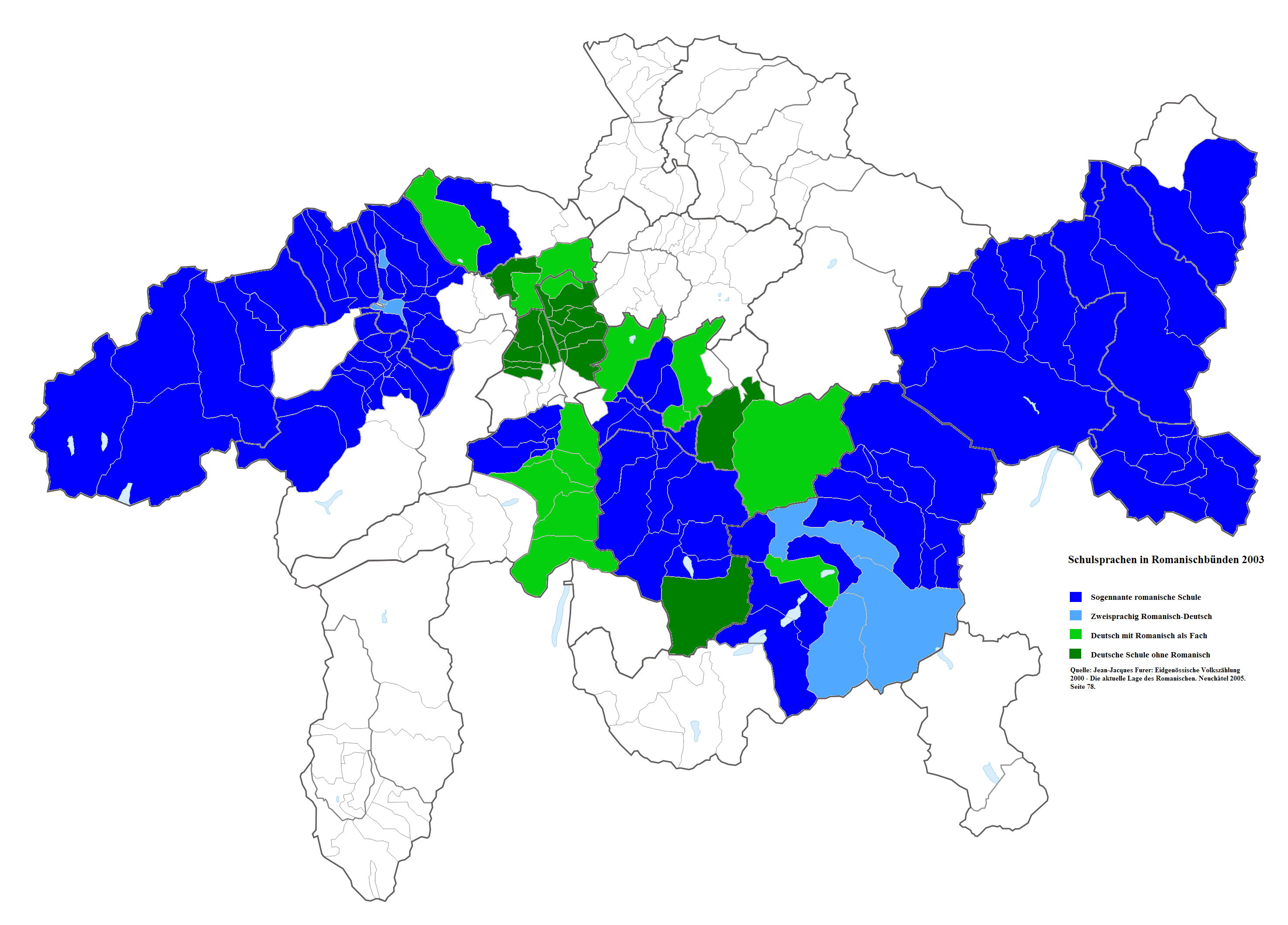
Languages of instruction in the traditionally Romansh-speaking areas of the Grisons as of 2003 Romansh school Bilingual Romansh-German school German school, Romansh as a subject German schooling only

Within the Romansh-speaking areas, three different types of educational models can be found: Romansh schools, bilingual schools, and German schools with Romansh as a subject.

In the Romansh schools, Romansh is the primary language of instruction during the first 3–6 years of the nine years of compulsory schooling, and German during the last 3–9 years. Due to this, this school type is often called the "so-called Romansh school". In practice, the amount of Romansh schooling varies between half and 4/5 of the compulsory school term, often depending on how many Romansh-speaking teachers are available. This "so-called Romansh school" was found in 82 municipalities of the Grisons as of 2001. The bilingual school was found only in Samedan, Pontresina, and Ilanz/Schnaus. In 15 municipalities, German was the sole medium of instruction as of 2001, with Romansh being taught as a subject.

Outside of areas where Romansh is traditionally spoken, Romansh is not offered as a subject and as of 2001, 17 municipalities within the historical language area of Romansh do not teach Romansh as a subject. On the secondary level, the language of instruction is mainly German, with Romansh as a subject in Romansh-speaking regions.

Outside of the traditional Romansh-speaking areas, the capital of the Grisons, Chur, runs a bilingual Romansh-German elementary school.

On the tertiary level, the University of Fribourg offers Bachelor- and Master programs for Romansh language and literature. The Romansh department there has been in existence since 1991. The University of Zürich also maintains a partial chair for Romansh language and literature together with the ETH Zürich since 1985.

== Geographic distribution ==
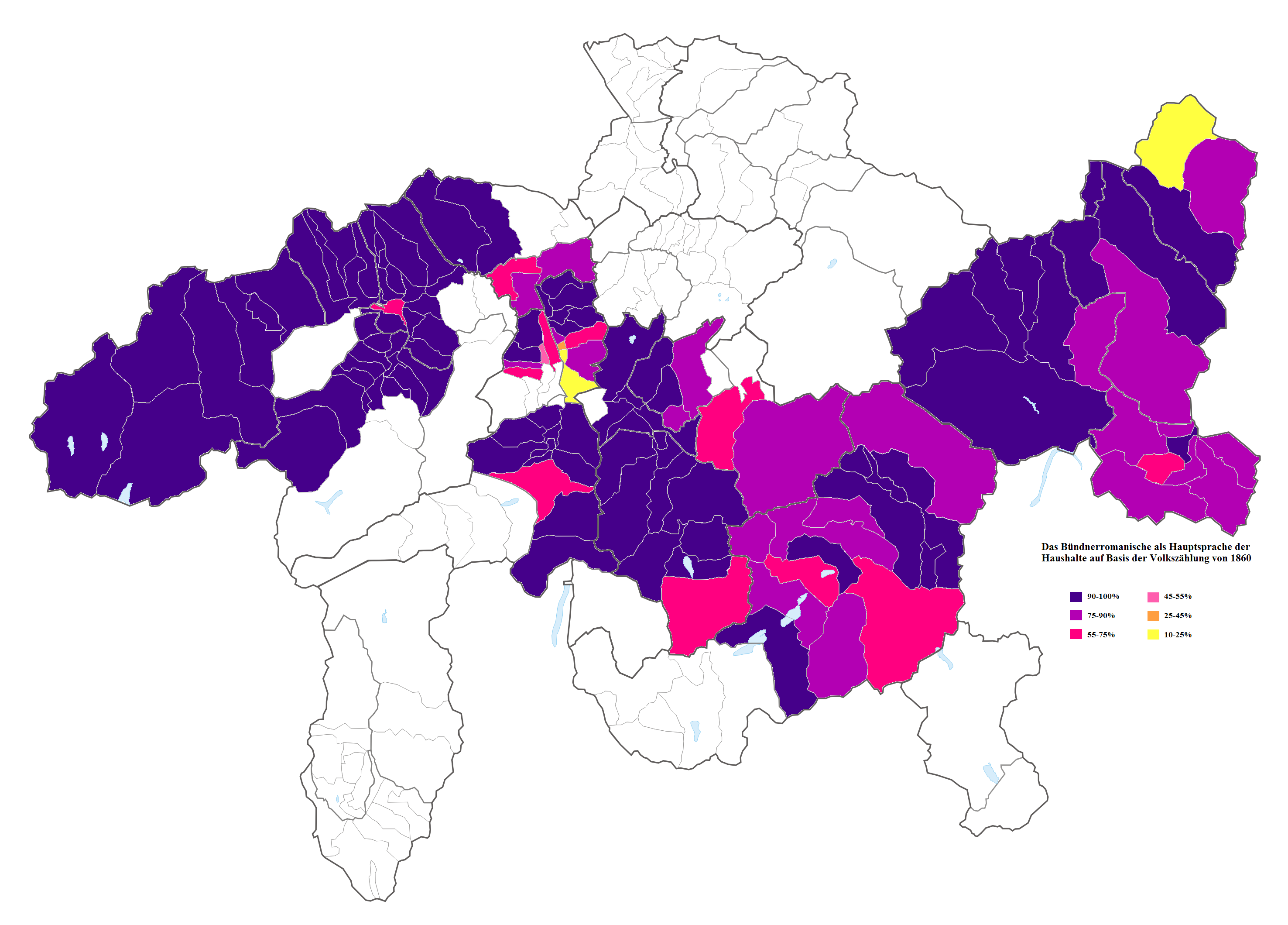
Romansh as a household language in the census of 1860, largely corresponding to the traditional language area 90–100% 75–90% 55–75% 45–55% 25–45% 10–25%

Though Romansh was spoken as far north as Lake Constance in the early Middle Ages, the language area of Romansh is today limited to parts of the canton of the Grisons; the last areas outside the canton to speak Romansh, the Vinschgau in South Tyrol, became German-speaking in the 17th century. Inside the Grisons, the language borders largely stabilized in the 16th century and remained almost unchanged until the 19th century. This language area is often called the "Traditional Romansh-speaking territory", a term introduced by the statistician Jean-Jacques Furer based on the results of the Swiss censusses. Furer defines this language area as those municipalities in which a majority declared Romansh as their mother tongue in any of the first four Swiss censuses between 1860 and 1888. In addition, he includes Fürstenau. This represented 121 municipalities at the time, corresponding to 116 present-day municipalities. The villages of Samnaun, Sils im Domleschg, Masein, and Urmein, which were still Romansh-speaking in the 17th century, had lost their Romansh majority by 1860, and are not included in this definition. This historical definition of the language area has been taken up in many subsequent publications, but the Swiss Federal Statistical Office for instance defines the language area of Romansh as those municipalities, where a majority declared to habitually use Romansh in the census of 2000.

The presence of Romansh within its traditional language area varies from region to region. In 2000, 66 municipalities still had a Romansh majority, an additional 32 had at least 20% who declared Romansh as their language of best command or as a habitually spoken language, while Romansh is either extinct or spoken only by a small minority in the remaining 18 municipalities within the traditional language area. In the Surselva region, it is the habitually spoken language of 78.5% and the language of best command of 66%. In the Sutselva region by contrast, Romansh is extinct or spoken only by a small number of older people, with the exception of Schams, where it is still transmitted to children and where some villages still have a Romansh majority, notably in the vicinity of the Schamserberg. In the Surmiran region, it is the main language in the Surses region, but no longer widely spoken in the Albula Valley.

In the Upper Engadine valley, it is a habitually spoken language for 30.8% and the language of best command for 13%. However, most children still acquire Romansh through the school system, which has retained Romansh as the primary language of instruction, even though Swiss German is more widely spoken inside the home. In the Lower Engadine, Romansh speakers form the majority in virtually all municipalities, with 60.4% declaring Romansh as their language of best command in 2000, and 77.4% declaring it as a habitually spoken language.

Outside of the traditional Romansh language area, Romansh is spoken by the so-called "Romansh diaspora", meaning people who have moved out of the Romansh-speaking valleys. A significant number are found in the capital of Grisons, Chur, as well as in Swiss cities outside of Grisons.

=== Current distribution ===
The current situation of Romansh is quite well researched. The number of speakers is known through the Swiss censuses, with the most recent having taken place in 2000, in addition to surveys by the Radio e Televisiun Rumantscha. The quantitative data from these surveys was summed up by statistician Jean-Jacques Furer in 2005. In addition, linguist Regula Cathomas performed a detailed survey of everyday language use, published in 2008.

Virtually all Romansh-speakers today are bilingual in Romansh and German. Whereas monolingual Romansh were still common at the beginning of the twentieth century, they are now found only among pre-school children. As Romansh linguist Ricarda Liver wrote in 1999:

Whereas the cliché of the bearded, sock-knitting Alpine shepherd who speaks and understands only Romansh, may still have been a reality here and there fifty years ago, there are nowadays no adult Romansh who do not possess a bilingual competence

— Ricarda Liver

The language situation today consists of a complex relationship between several diglossia, since there is a functional distribution within Romansh itself between the local dialect, the regional standard variety, and nowadays the pan-regional variety Rumantsch Grischun as well; and German is also acquired in two varieties: Swiss German and Standard German. Additionally, in Val Müstair many people also speak Bavarian German as a second language. Aside from German, many Romansh also speak additional languages, such as French, Italian, or English, learned at school or acquired through direct contact.

The Swiss census of 1990 and 2000 asked for the "language of best command" as well as for the languages habitually used in the family, at work, and in school. Previous censuses had asked only for the "mother tongue". In 1990, Romansh was named as the "language of best command" by 39,632 people, with a decrease to 35,095 in 2000. As a family language, Romansh is more widespread, with 55,707 having named it in 1990, and 49,134 in 2000. As a language used at work, Romansh was more widely used in 2000 with 20,327 responses than in 1990 with 17,753, as it was as a language used at school, with 6,411 naming it in 2000 as compared to 5,331 in 1990. Overall, a total of 60,561 people reported that they used Romansch of some sort on a habitual basis, representing 0.83% of the Swiss population. As the language of best command, Romansh comes in 11th in Switzerland with 0.74%, with the non-national languages Serbian, Croatian, Albanian, Portuguese, Spanish, English, and Turkish all having more speakers than Romansh.

In the entire canton of the Grisons, where about two-thirds of all speakers live, roughly a sixth report it as the language of best command (29,679 in 1990 and 27,038 in 2000). As a family language it was used by 19.5% in 2000 (33,707), as a language used on the job by 17.3% (15,715), and as a school language by 23.3% (5,940). Overall, 21.5% (40,168) of the population of the Grisons reported to be speaking Romansh habitually in 2000. Within the traditional Romansh-speaking areas, where 56.1% (33,991) of all speakers lived in 2000, it is the majority language in 66 municipalities.

Speakers within the Romansh-speaking area as defined by Jean-Jacques Furer
	1990		2000	
	No.	%	No.	%
Total	34,274	51.32%	33,991	46.44%
Language of best command	25,894	38.78%	24,016	32.81%
Family language	30,985	47.68%	28,712	42.50%
Language used in employment	11,655	37.92%	13,734	38.14%
Language used in school	4,479	54.44%	5,645	54.91%

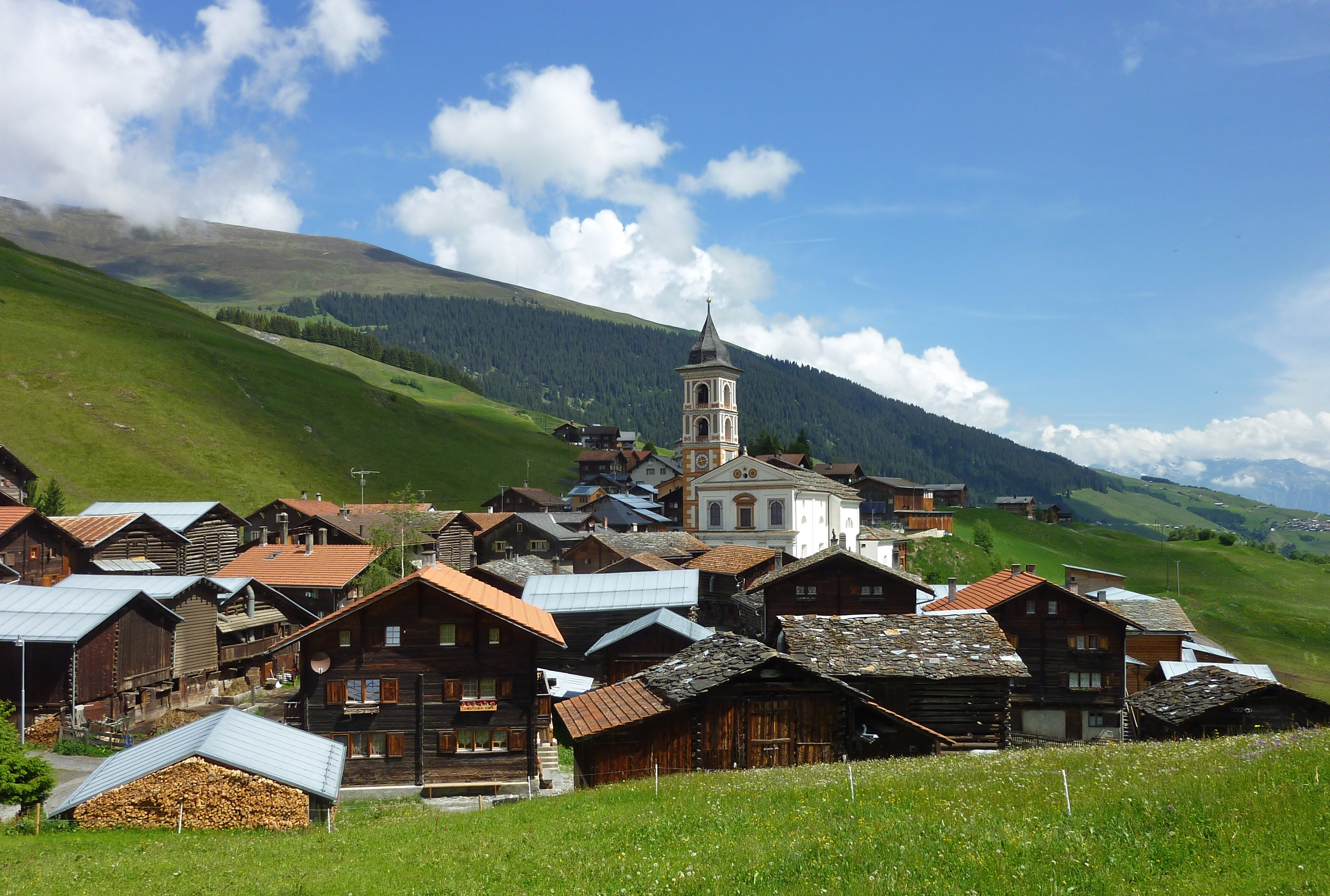
Vrin, the municipality with the highest percentage of people naming Romansh as their language of best command in 2000 (95.6%)

The status of Romansh differs widely within this traditional area. Whereas in some areas Romansh is used by virtually the entire population, in others the only speakers are people who have moved there from elsewhere. Overall, Romansh dominates in most of the Surselva and the Lower Engadine as well as parts of the Surses, whereas German is the dominant daily language in most other areas, though Romansh is often still used and transmitted in a limited manner regardless.

In general, Romansh is the dominant language in most of the Surselva. In the western areas, the Cadi and the Lumnezia, it is the language of a vast majority, with around 80% naming it as their language of best command, and it often being a daily language for virtually the entire population. In the eastern areas of the Gruob around Ilanz, German is significantly more dominant in daily life, though most people still use Romansh regularly. Romansh is still acquired by most children in the Cadi and Gruob even in villages where Romansh speakers are in the minority, since it is usually the language of instruction in primary education there. Even in villages where Romansh dominates, newcomers rarely learn Romansh, as Sursilvan speakers quickly accommodate by switching to German, so that there is often little opportunity to practice Romansh even when people are willing to learn it. Some pressure is often exerted by children, who will sometimes speak Romansh even with their non-Romansh-speaking parents.

In the Imboden District by contrast, it is only used habitually by 22%, and is the language of best command for only 9.9%. Even within this district, the presence of Romansh varies, with 41.3% in Trin reporting to speak it habitually. In the Sutselva, the local Romansh dialects are extinct in most villages, with a few elder speakers remaining in places such as Präz, Scharans, Feldis/Veulden, and Scheid, though passive knowledge is slightly more common. Some municipalities still offer Romansh as a foreign language subject in school, though it is often under pressure of being replaced by Italian. The notably exception is Schams, where it is still regularly transmitted to children and where the language of instruction is Romansh. In the Surmeir region, it is still the dominant everyday language in the Surses, but has mostly disappeared from the Albula Valley. The highest proportion of habitual speakers is found in Salouf with 86.3%, the lowest in Obervaz with 18.9%. In these areas, many Romansh speakers only speak German with their spouses as an accommodation or because of a habit, though they sometimes speak Romansh to their children. In most cases, this is not because of a will to preserve the language, but because of other reasons such as Romansh having been their own childhood language or a belief that their children will later find it easier to learn additional languages.

In the Upper Engadine, it is used habitually by 30.8% and the language of best command for 13%, with only S-chanf having a Romansh majority. Even though the main every-day and family language is German, Romansh is not in imminent danger of disappearing in the Upper Engadine, due to the strong emotional attachment to the language and in particular the Romansh-language school, which means that a Romansh-speaking core always exists in some form. Romansh is often a sign of being one of the locals, and used to distinguish oneself from tourists or temporary residents, so that outsiders will sometimes acquire Romansh in order to fit in. In the Lower Engadine by contrast, Romansh is the majority language virtually everywhere, with over 80% reporting it as a habitually spoken language in most villages. The status of Romansh is even stronger in the Val Müstair, where 86.4% report to speak it habitually, and 74.1% as their language of best command. In the Lower Engadine, outsiders are generally expected to learn Romansh if they wish to be integrated into the local community and take part in social life. In addition, there is often pressure from inside the family to learn Romansh.

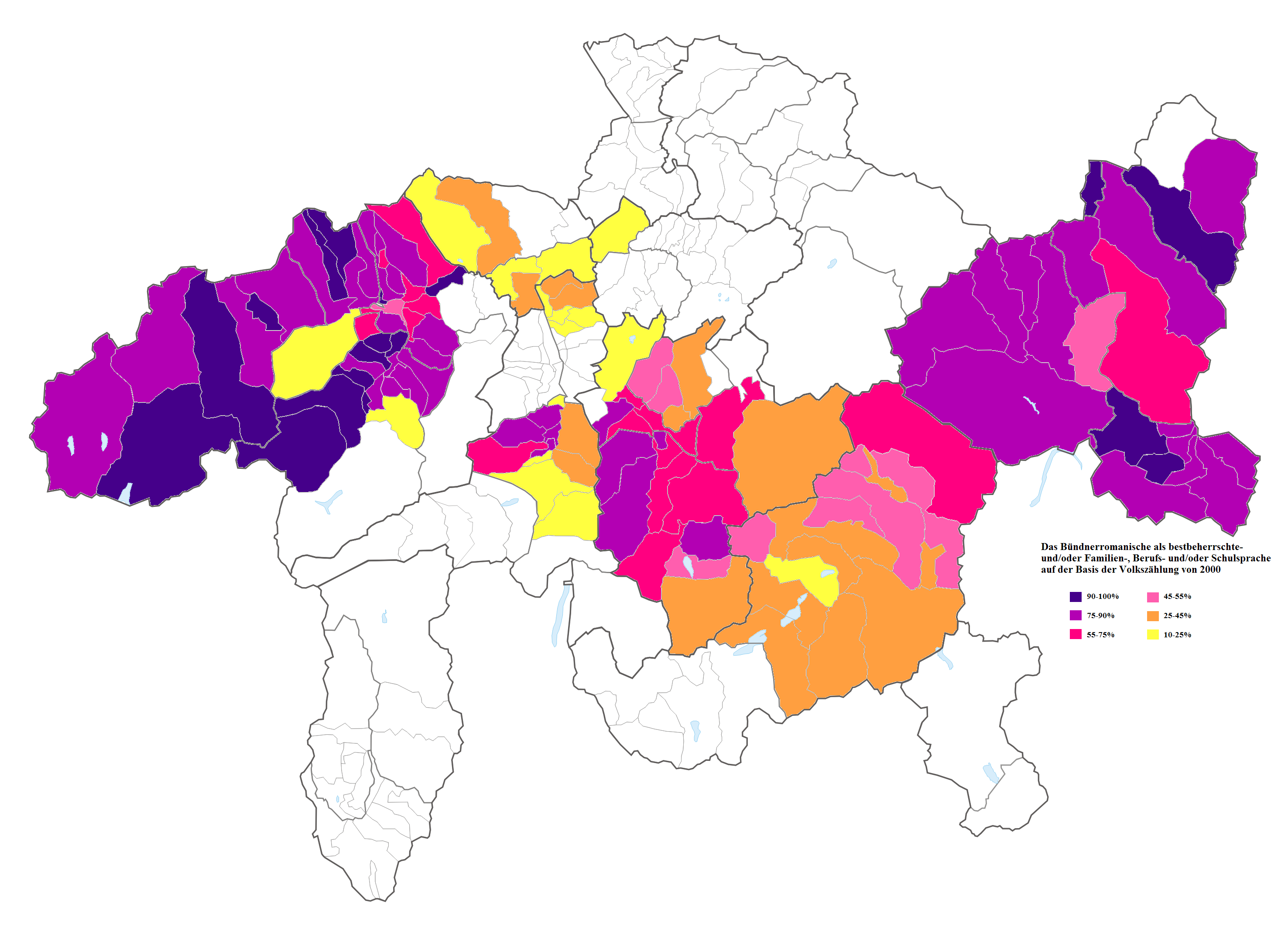
Romansh as a habitually spoken language within the traditional language area in 2000

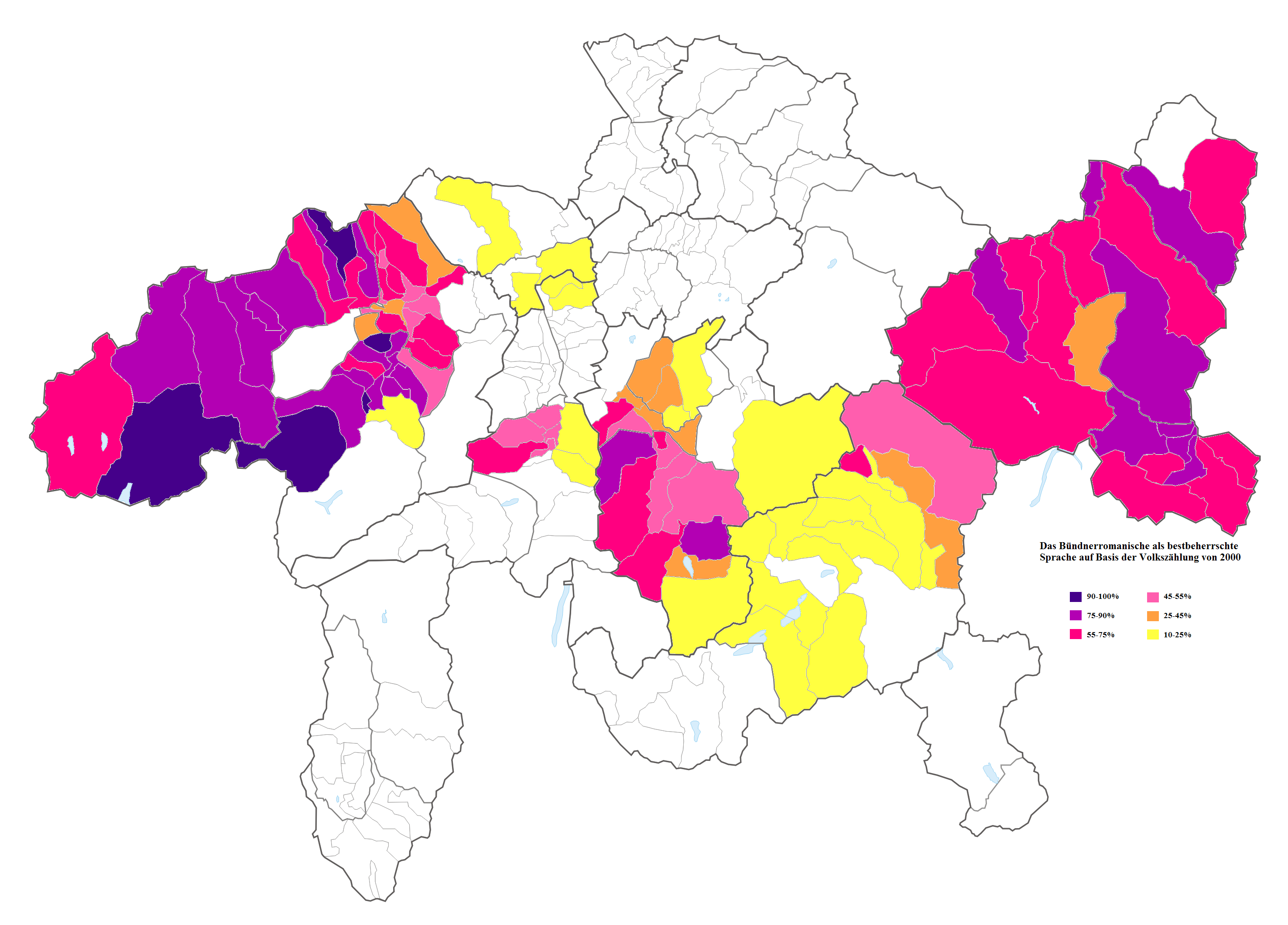
Romansh as the language of best command within the traditional language area in 2000

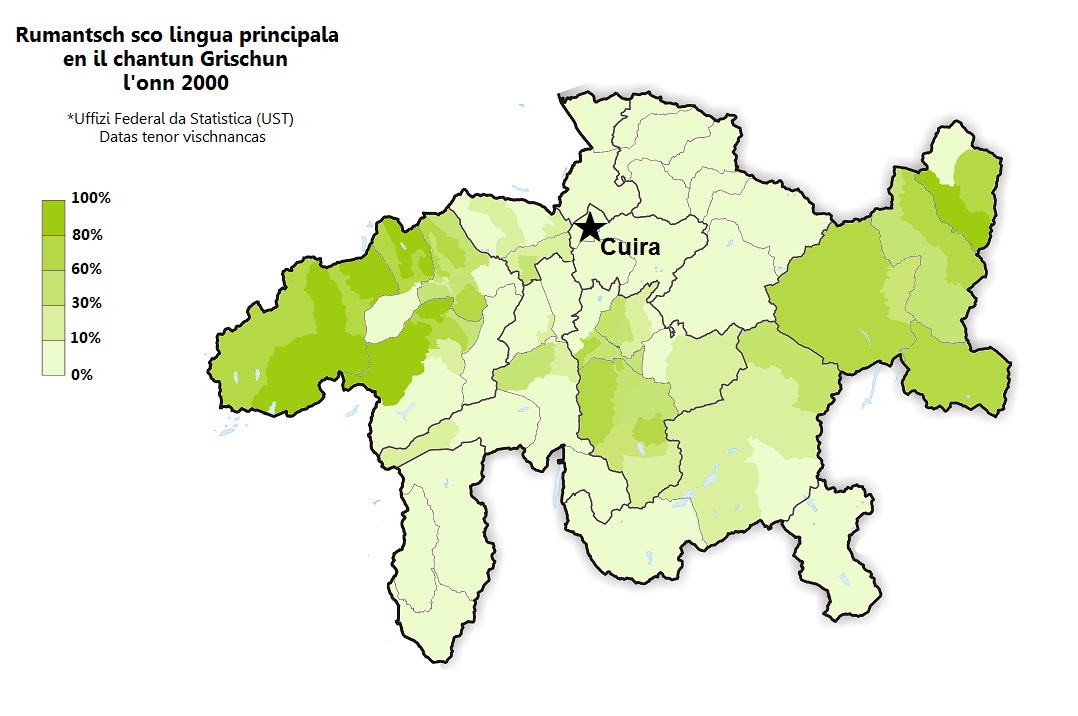
Romansh as the language of best command in the entire canton

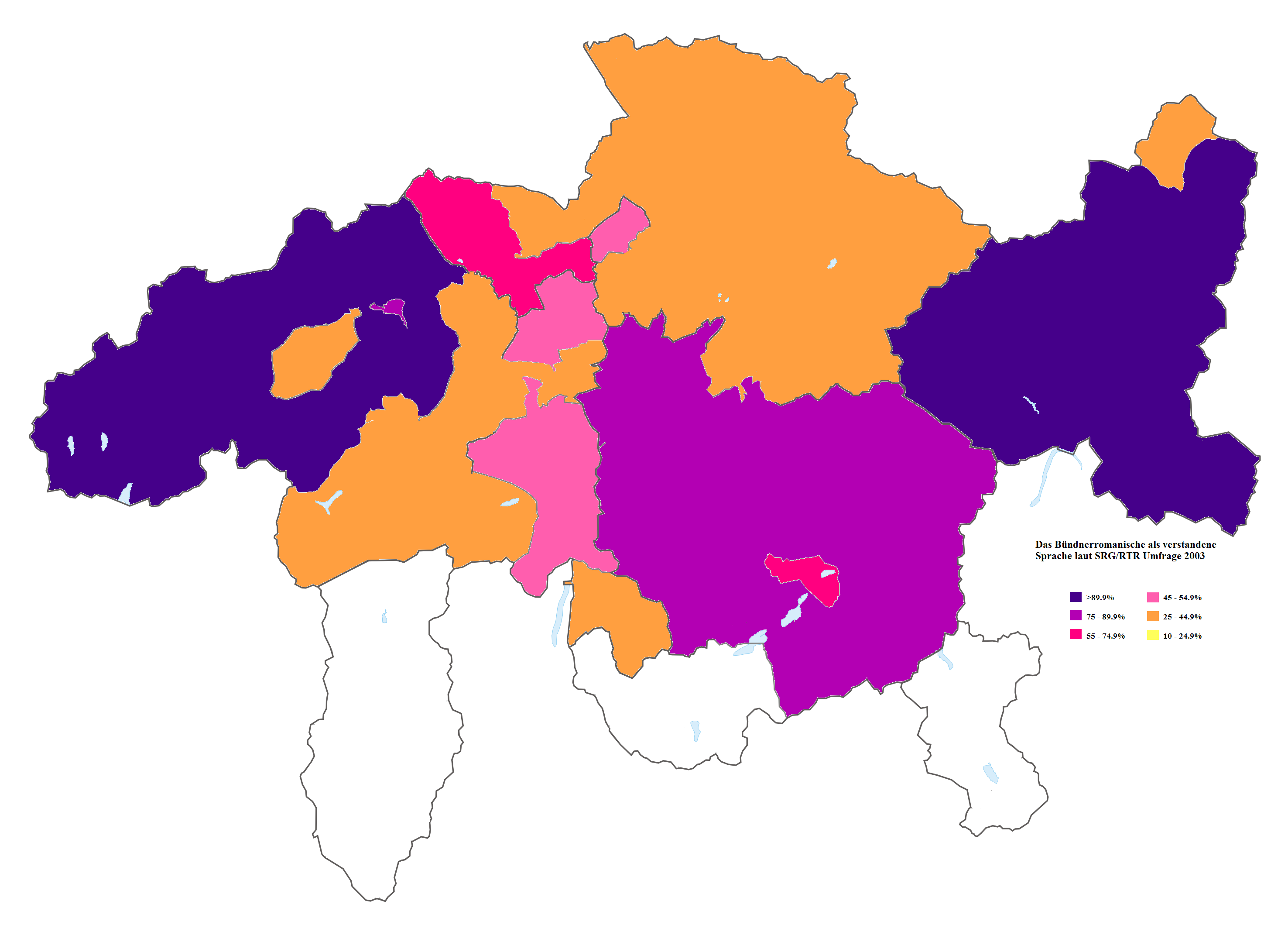
Percentage of people reporting to understand Romansh in 2003

Overall, Jean-Jacques Furer concludes that the shrinkage of the Romansh-speaking areas is continuing, though at different rates depending on the region. At the same time, he notes that Romansh is still very much alive, a fact that is obvious in those areas where it retains a strong presence, such as most parts of the Surselva and the Lower Engadine. It is also assured that Romansh will continue to be transmitted for several more generations, even though each succeeding generation will be more and more rooted in German as well as Romansh. As a result, if the overall linguistic situation does not change, speakers will slowly become fewer and fewer with each generation. He also concludes that there are still enough speakers to ensure that Romansh will survive in the long term at least in certain regions. He considers the Romansh-language school system to be the single most crucial factor in this.

== Phonology ==
Spoken Romansh

Romansh has up to 26 consonant phonemes. Two are found only in some varieties, and one is found only in loanwords borrowed from German.

		Labial	Dental and alveolar	Palato- alveolar	Palatal	Velar	Glottal
Nasal		m	n		ɲ	^{1}ŋ	
Plosive	voiceless	p	t			k	
Plosive	voiced	b	d			ɡ	
Affricate	voiceless		ts	tʃ	^{2}tɕ		
Affricate	voiced				^{2}dʑ		
Fricative	voiceless	f	s	ʃ	^{3}ç		^{4}h
Fricative	voiced	v	z	ʒ			
Approximant					j		
Lateral			l		ʎ		
Trill			^{5}r				

Notes:

^1 in only some dialects, notably Surmiran, and only word-final as in paung "bread".
^2 often transcribed as the palatal stops [c] and [ɟ] in broad transcriptions.
^3 in only some dialects, notably Putèr, and only word-finally as in amih, "friend".
^4 occurs only in German loanwords such as halunc "crook".
^5 also pronounced [ʁ] in some dialects of Sursilvan.

The voiced obstruents are fully voiced in Romansh, in contrast to Swiss German with which Romansh is in extensive contact, and voiceless obstruents are non-aspirated. Voiced obstruents are devoiced word-finally, however, as in buob "boy" > [buɔp], chöd "warm" > [tɕøt], saung "blood" > [sɛuŋk], or clav "key" > [klaf].

Monophthongs	Front		Central	Back
Monophthongs	unrounded	rounded	Central	Back
Close	i	y		u
Close-mid	e	ø		o
Mid	ɛ			ɔ
Open			a	

The vowel inventory varies somewhat between dialects, as the front rounded vowels /y/ and /ø/ are found only in Putèr and Vallader. They have historically been unrounded in the other varieties and are found only in recent loans from German there. They are not found in the pan-regional variety Rumantsch Grischun either. The now nearly extinct Sutsilvan dialects of the Heinzenberg have /œ/ as in plànta "plant" or "tree", but this is etymologically unrelated to the [ø] found in Putèr and Vallader. The exact realization of the phoneme /o/ varies from [ʊ] to [o] depending on the dialect: cudesch / cudisch "book". It is regarded as either a marginal phoneme or not a separate phoneme from /u/ by some linguists.

Word stress generally falls either on the last or the penult syllable of a word. Unstressed vowels are generally reduced to a schwa, whose exact pronunciation varies between [ə] or [ɐ] as in canzun "song". Vowel length is predictable:

- Unstressed vowels are short.
- Stressed vowels in closed syllables (those with a coda) are:
  long before /r/
  short elsewhere
- Stressed vowels in open syllables are:
  short before voiceless consonants
  long elsewhere

The number of diphthongs varies significantly between dialects. Sursilvan dialects contain eleven diphthongs and four triphthongs ([ɪau], [ɪɛu], [uau], and [uɛi]).

Diphthongs	Falling	Rising
Closing	[aɪ] [au] [ɛɪ] [ɛu] [uɪ] [ɪu]	
Centering	[iə]	
Opening	[uɔ]	[uɛ] [ɪa] [ua]

Other dialects have different inventories; Putèr, for instance, lacks [au], [ɛu], and [uɛ] as well as the triphthongs but has [yə], which is missing in Sursilvan. A phenomenon known as "hardened diphthongs", in which the second vowel of a falling Diphthong is pronounced as [k], was once common in Putèr as well, but is nowadays limited to Surmiran: strousch 'barely > [ʃtrokʃ].

== Orthography ==
Romansh is written in the Latin alphabet, and mostly follows a phonemic orthography, with a high correspondence between letters and sounds. The orthography varies slightly depending on the variety.

Capitals
A	B	C	D	E	F	G	H	I	J	L	M	N	O	Ö	P	Q	R	S	T	U	Ü	V	X	Z
Lowercase
a	b	c	d	e	f	g	h	i	j	l	m	n	o	ö	p	q	r	s	t	u	ü	v	x	z
Names
a	be	tse	de	e	ef	ghe	ha	i	jot/i lung	el	em	en	o	ö	pe	cu	er	es	te	u	ü	ve	ichs	tset

Consonants
Orthography	IPA	Example	Notes
⟨b⟩	[b]	Surs. baselgia "church", Put. bügl "water well"	
⟨c⟩	[k]	Surs. canaster "basket", Put. corda "cord"	Before ⟨a⟩, ⟨o⟩, ⟨u⟩ and consonants
⟨c⟩	[ts]	Surs. december, Vall. celebrar "to celebrate"	Before ⟨e⟩ and ⟨i⟩
⟨ch⟩	[tɕ]	Put. chapütscha "hat", zücher "sugar"	In Putèr and Vallader
⟨ch⟩	[k]	Surs. zucher "sugar"	In Sursilvan, Sutsilvan, and Surmiran
⟨d⟩	[d]	Surs. dir "inside", Put. rouda "wheel"	
⟨f⟩	[f]	Surs. fil "string", Put. fö "fire"	
⟨g⟩	[ɡ]	Surs. gattegl "kitten", Put. god "forest"	Before ⟨a⟩, ⟨o⟩, ⟨u⟩ and voiced consonants
⟨g⟩	[dʑ]	Surs. tegia "hut", Put. gö "game", saung "blood"	Before ⟨e⟩, ⟨ö⟩, ⟨i⟩, and ⟨ü⟩; the ⟨i⟩ is silent when followed by another vowel; word-finally in Putèr and Vallader (usually devoiced)
⟨gh⟩	[ɡ]	Surs. schenghegiar "to give a gift", Put. ghigna "grimace"	Before ⟨e⟩ and ⟨i⟩ (appears nowhere else)
⟨gl⟩	[ɡl]	Surs. Glaruna "Glarus", Vall. glatsch "ice"	Before ⟨a⟩, ⟨e⟩, ⟨o⟩, ⟨u⟩, and ⟨ö⟩
⟨gl⟩	[ʎ]	Surs. egl "eye", maglia "food", Put. glüsch "light"	Before ⟨i⟩, ⟨ü⟩, and word-final; the ⟨i⟩ is silent when another vowel follows
⟨gn⟩	[ɲ]	Surs. gnierv "nerve", Put. chavagna "basket"	
⟨h⟩	(silent)	Surs. habitaziun "habitation", Vall. hoz "today"	In most cases; see also ⟨ch⟩, ⟨gh⟩, and ⟨sch⟩
⟨h⟩	[h]	Surs. haluncs "crooks", Vall. hobi "hobby"	In some interjections and loanwords
⟨h⟩	[ç]	Put. amih "friend"	In older Putèr
⟨j⟩	[j]	Surs. jamna "week", Put. muja "two-year-old cow"	
⟨k⟩	[k]	Vall. kilo "kilogram", Vall. tockin "little piece"	Occurs only in loanwords except in Putèr and Vallader, where it also occurs before ⟨i⟩ and ⟨e⟩
⟨l⟩	[l]	Surs. lev "light", Put. miel "honey"	
⟨m⟩	[m]	Surs. mellen "yellow", Put. mül "mole"	
⟨n⟩	[n]	Surs. paun "bread", Put. punt "bridge"	Except as below
⟨ng⟩	[ŋ]	pang "bread"	only in Surmiran
⟨p⟩	[p]	Surs. pur "farmer", Put. pom "apple"	
⟨qu⟩	[ku̯]	Surs. quater "four", Put. quint "bill"	
⟨r⟩	[r] or [ʁ]	Put. trais "three", sur. treis "three"	can be either alveolar or uvular, depending on the dialect and speaker
⟨s⟩	[s]	Surs. sulegl "sun", Put. qualchosa "something"	Usually at the beginnings of words and after consonants; always in ⟨ss⟩ and always at the end of a word
⟨s⟩	[z]	Surs. casa "house", Put. maisa "table"	Usually between vowels; sometimes after ⟨l⟩, ⟨n⟩, or ⟨r⟩; sometimes at the beginning of a word
⟨s⟩	[ʃ]	Surs. scaffa "cupboard", Put. spler "butterfly"	Before voiceless consonants; at the beginning of a word before ⟨m⟩, ⟨n⟩, or ⟨r⟩
⟨s⟩	[ʒ]	Surs. sbagl "mistake", Put. sdun "spoon"	Before a voiced obstruent
⟨sch⟩	[ʃ]	Surs. schavet "dull", Put. schmancher "to forget"	In all positions, not distinguished in writing from [ʒ]
⟨sch⟩	[ʒ]	Surs. pischada "butter", Put. travascher "to work"	In all positions except word-finally, not distinguished in writing from [ʃ]
⟨s-ch⟩	[ʃtɕ]	Put. pas-chüra "pasture"	only occurs in Putèr and Vallader, corresponds to ⟨stg⟩ in other dialects
⟨t⟩	[t]	Surs. tut "all", Put. tuot "all"	
⟨tg⟩	[tɕ]	Surs. vitg "village"	Before ⟨e⟩, ⟨i⟩; the ⟨i⟩ is silent when followed by another vowel; corresponds to ⟨ch⟩ in Putèr and Vallader
⟨tsch⟩	[tʃ]	Surs. tschintschar "to talk", Put. tschöver "labor strike"	
⟨v⟩	[v]	Surs. riva "shore", Put. verdüra "vegetables"	
⟨w⟩	[v]	pista da bowling "bowling alley"	Occurs only in foreign words
⟨x⟩	[ks]	exact "exactly"	mainly occurs in learned words and proper names
⟨y⟩	(Depends on pronunciation in original language)	Vall. hockey "hockey"	Occurs only in foreign words
⟨z⟩	[ts]	Surs. canzun "song", Put. zop "hideout"	

The vowel inventories of the five regional written varieties differ widely (in particular in regards to diphthongs), and the pronunciation often differs depending on the dialect even within them. The orthography of Sutsilvan is particularly complex, allowing for different pronunciations of the vowels depending on the regional dialect, and is not treated in this table.

Vowels
Orthography	IPA	Example	Notes
⟨a⟩	[a]	Surs. clav "key", Put. bagn "bath"	In stressed syllables
⟨a⟩	[ɐ] or [ə]	Surs. casa "house", canzun "song", Put. chanzun "song", mellan "yellow"	In unstressed syllables
⟨ai⟩	[ai̯]	Surs. zai "tough", Put. naiv "snow"	
⟨au⟩	[au̯]	Surs. aur "gold", Vall. paur "farmer"	in most dialects
⟨au⟩	[ɛ]	Put. maun "hand"	in Putèr
⟨e⟩	[ɛ]	sur. lev "light", Put. fnestra "window"	In stressed syllables
⟨e⟩	[e]	sur. tegia "hut", Put. allegra "greeting"	In stressed syllables
⟨e⟩	[ə] or [ɐ]	sur. mellen "yellow", Vall. cudesch "book"	In unstressed syllables
⟨é⟩	[e]	Surs. pér "pear"	usually only words where [e] contrasts with [ɛ] are written with accents
⟨ê⟩	[e]	Put. pêr "pair"	usually only words where [e] contrasts with [ɛ] are written with accents
⟨è⟩	[ɛ]	Surs. pèr "pair"	usually only words where [e] contrasts with [ɛ] are written with accents
⟨ei⟩	[ɛi̯], [ai̯], or [ɔi̯]	Surs. meisa "table", Put. meidi "doctor"	the exact pronunciation depends on the dialect
⟨eu⟩	[ɛu̯]	Surs. jeu "I", Vall. glieud "people"	
⟨i⟩	[i]	Surs. ti "you", Put. tizcher "to start a fire"	But see above for ⟨gi⟩ and ⟨gli⟩
⟨ï⟩	[i]	Put. gïun "double bass"	marks that the vowel does not form a diphthong with the following vowel
⟨ia⟩	[i̯a]	Surs. fiasta "feast"	
⟨ie⟩	[ie̯]	Surs. tschiel "sky", Put. miel "honey"	
⟨iu⟩	[iu̯]	Surs. ischiu "vinegar"	
⟨iau⟩	[i̯au̯]	Surs. cumiau "parting"	
⟨ieu⟩	[i̯ɛu̯]	Surs. jeu "I"	also written ⟨jeu⟩
⟨o⟩	[ɔ]	sur. comba "leg'", Put. pom "apple",	
⟨ou⟩	[ɔ]	Put. vouta "time"	in Putèr
⟨ou⟩	[o]	Vall. rouda "wheel"	in Vallader
⟨ou⟩	[ou̯]	sur. nous "we"	in Surmiran
⟨u⟩	[u]	sur. luvrar "to work", Put. tudas-ch "German"	depending on the word and dialect
⟨u⟩	[o], [ʊ]	sur. cudisch "book", Put. cudesch "book"	depending on the word and dialect
⟨ua⟩	[u̯a]	Surs. quater "four", Put. aguagliöl "nail"	
⟨ue⟩	[u̯ɛ]	Surs. quen "bill"	
⟨ui⟩	[u̯i]	Put. quint "bill"	
⟨uo⟩	[uɔ̯]	Surs. buob "boy", Put. chamuotsch "chamois"	
⟨uai⟩	[u̯ai̯]	quai "this", Put. frequaint "frequently"	
⟨uei⟩	[u̯ɛi̯]	Surs. quei "this"	
⟨uau⟩	[u̯au̯]	Surs. uaul "forest"	
⟨ö⟩	[ø]	Put. chaschöl "cheese"	only in Putèr and Vallader
⟨ü⟩	[y]	Put. tü "you"	only in Putèr and Vallader
⟨üe⟩	[yɛ̯]	Put. spüerta "offer"	only in Putèr and Vallader
⟨y⟩	(Depends on pronunciation in original language)	Vall. hockey "hockey"	Occurs only in foreign words

== Morphology ==
The following description deals mainly with the Sursilvan dialect, which is the best-studied so far. The dialects Putèr and Vallader of the Engadine valley in particular diverge considerably from Sursilvan in many points. When possible, such differences are described.

Nouns are not inflected for case in Romansh; the grammatical category is expressed through word order instead. As in most other Romance languages, Romansh nouns belong to two grammatical genders: masculine and feminine. A definite article (masc. il or igl before a vowel; fem. la) is distinguished from an indefinite article (masc. in, egn, en or ün, depending on the dialect; fem. ina, egna, ena or üna). The plural is usually formed by adding the suffix -s. In Sursilvan, masculine nouns are sometimes irregular, with the stem vowel alternating:

- il mir "the wall" – ils mirs "the walls".
- la casa "the house" – las casas "the houses".
- irregular: igl iev "the egg" – ils ovs "the eggs".

A particularity of Romansh is the so-called "collective plural" to refer to a mass of things as a whole:

- il crap "the stone" – ils craps "the stones".
- collective: la crappa "rock".

Adjectives are inflected according to gender and number. Feminine forms are always regular, but the stem vowel sometimes alternates in the masculine forms:

- fem. bial (sg.) – biala (pl.) "good"
- masc. bien (sg.) – buns (pl.) "good".

Sursilvan also distinguishes an attributive and predicative form of adjectives in the singular. This is not found in some of the other dialects:

- Attributive: in bien carstgaun "a good human (person)"
- Predicative : il carstgaun ei buns "the human (person) is good"

There are three singular and three plural pronouns in Romansh (Sursilvan forms shown below):

	sg.	pl.
1st person	jeu	nus
2nd person	ti	vus
3rd person	el/ella/ei(igl)	els/ellas/ei

There is a T–V distinction between familiar ti and polite vus. Putèr and Vallader distinguish between familiar tü and vus and polite El/Ella and Els/Ellas. Pronouns for the polite forms in Putèr and Vallader are always capitalized to distinguish them from third person pronouns: Eau cugnuosch a Sia sour "I know your sister" and Eau cugnuosch a sia sour "I know his/her sister".

The 1st and 2nd person pronouns for a direct object have two distinct forms, with one occurring following the preposition a: dai a mi tiu codisch "give me your book".

A particularity of Sursilvan is that reflexive verbs are all formed with the reflexive pronoun se-, which was originally only the third person pronoun:

- jeu selavel "I am washing myself".
- ti selaves "you are washing yourself".
- el/ella selava "he/she is washing her/himself".
- nus selavein "we are washing ourselves".
- els/ellas selavan "they are washing themselves".

The other Romansh dialects distinguish different reflexive pronouns.

Possessive pronouns occur in a pronominal and a predicative form that differ only in the masculine form, however:

- miu tgaun "my dog" – il tgaun ei mes "the dog is mine".
- vies problem "your problem" – quei problem ei vos "that problem is yours".

The feminine remains the same: sia casa "her/his house" – quella casa ei sia "this house is hers/his".

Three different demonstrative pronouns quel, tschel, and lez are distinguished: A quel fidel jeu, a tschel buc "I trust that one, but not that other one" or Ed il bab, tgei vegn lez a dir? "and the father, what is he going to say?".

Verb tenses are divided into synthetic forms (present, imperfect) and analytic forms (perfect, pluperfect, future, passive) distinguished by the grammatical moods indicative, subjunctive, conditional, and imperative. These are most common forms in Sursilvan:

Tense	Example	Translation
Indicative present	jeu sun da Trun	"I am from Trun"
Indicative perfect	jeu sun staus en vacanzas	"I have been on vacation"
Imperfect	da quei savevel jeu nuot	"I didn't know anything about that"
Future	els vegnan a dir	"they will say"
Imperative	cantei!	"sing!"
Conditional	jeu durmess	"I would sleep"

== Syntax ==
The syntax of Romansh has not been thoroughly investigated so far. Regular word order is subject–verb–object, but subject-auxiliary inversion occurs in several cases, placing the verb at the beginning of a sentence:

- To form a question: Eis el aunc cheu? – "Is he still there?".
- In declarative sentences: Damaun mein nus en vacanzas – "Tomorrow, we go on vacation".
- When an independent clause is placed after the dependent clause: Cura ch'el ei entraus, ein tuts stai sin peis – "When he entered, everyone stood up".
- As well as in other stylistic variations.

These features are in close concord with German syntax, which has likely reinforced them. However, this need not mean that they are due entirely to language contact. In fact, similar tendencies can be observed in Old French.

A sentence is negated by adding a negative particle. In Sursilvan, this is buc, placed after the verb, while in other dialects such as Putèr and Vallader, it is nu, placed before the verb:

- Sursilvan: Jeu hai buc fatg quei – "I didn't do that".
- Putèr: La vschinauncha nu vegn isoleda da la naiv – "The village does not get cut off by snow".

A feature found only in Putèr and Vallader (as it is in Castilian Spanish) is the preposition of a direct object, when that direct object is a person or an animal, with a, as in test vis a Peider? "did you see Peter?", eau d'he mno a spass al chaun "I took the dog out for a walk", but hest vis la baselgia? "did you see the church?".

== Vocabulary ==
No systematic synchronic description of Romansh vocabulary has been carried out so far. Existing studies usually approach the subject from a historical perspective, taking particular interest in pre-Roman substratum, archaic words preserved only in Romansh, or in loan words from German. A project to compile together all known historic and modern Romansh vocabulary is the Dicziunari Rumantsch Grischun, first published in 1904, with the 13th edition currently in preparation.

=== Raetic and Celtic ===
The influence of the languages (Raetic and Celtic) spoken in Grisons before the arrival of the Romans is most obvious in placenames, which are often pre-Roman. Since very little is known about the Celtic language once spoken in Grisons, and almost nothing about Raetic, words or placenames thought to come from them are usually simply referred to as "pre-Roman". Apart from placenames, such words are found in landscape features, plant and animal names unique to the Alps, and tools and methods related to alpine transhumance. Such words include:

- Raetic: gnieu (Surs. igniv; Suts. (a)gnieu, ugnieu; Surm. nia; Put., Val. gnieu; Jauer agnieu) "nest, eyrie", ampauna (Surs. puauna; Suts. omgia, ontga; Surm. omgia; Puter ampa; Val. amp(u)a) "raspberry", izun (Surs. izun; Suts. (n)izùn; Surm. izung; Put., Val. uzun; Jauer anzola) "bilberry", chamutsch (Surs. camutsch; Suts., Surm. tgamutsch; Put., Val. chamuotsch) "chamois", crap (all dialects) "rock", gonda (Val.) "scree slope", grip (Surs., Suts. grep; Surm. crepel, crap; Put., Val. grip) 'cliff', grusaida (Surs. grusaida; Put., Val. grusaida) "snow rose", panaglia (Surs. panaglia; Val. panaglia) "butter churn", schember (Surs. schiember; Suts., Surm. schember; Put., Val. dschember) "Swiss pine" (< *gimberu < Raetic *𐌊𐌉𐌌𐌓𐌖 (*kimru, *gimru).), signun (Surs. signun; Val. signun, Put. signun, sain) "chief herder on a seasonal pasture" (cf. German Senn), tschess (Surs. tschéss; Surm. tschess, tschissùn) '(golden) eagle', urlaun (Surs.) 'ptarmigan';
- Celtic: carmun (Surs. carmun) "weasel", dischariel (Surs. derschalet; Surm. darschalet, ischier; Put., Val. dischöl) "goblin, nightmare", draig "sieve", glitta (Surs. gliet(ta)) "silt, mud", grava (Surs. grava; Val. grava) "scree", mat "boy" ~ matta (Surs., Surm., Put., Val. matta; Suts. mata) "girl", mellen (Surs. mellen; Surm., Put. mellen; Suts. melen) "yellow", tegia (Surs. tegia; Suts., Surm. tigia; Put. tegia; Val. teja) "alpine hut", trutg (Surs., Suts. trutg; Surm. trotg; Put. truoch; Val. truoi) "footpath, drove way", tschigrun (Surs. tschigrun; Put., Val. tschigrun) "whey cheese".
- Other Pre-Roman words include: chalun (Surs. calun; Suts. calùn; Surm. calung; Put., Val. gialun) "hip" (< *galon), tschanc (Put., Val.) "left (hand)" (< *čaŋk, *čamp), lisüra (Put., Val.) "joint, link" (< *lisura). Some other possibly Pre-Roman origin words are: tatona (Surs., Suts. totona; Surm. tutona) "nape of the neck, back of the neck", brentina (Surs. brentina; Suts. brenta, brantgegna; Surm. brainta; Val. brenta) "fog, mist", dascha (Val.) "twig".

=== Latin stock ===
Like all languages, Romansh has its own archaisms, that is, words derived from Latin that in most other Romance languages have fallen out of use or taken niche meanings. Examples include baselgia "church" (cf. Vegliote bašalka, Romanian biserică), nuidis "grudgingly, reluctantly" (< Latin invitus), urar "to pray" (cf. Portuguese orar, Romanian a ura ‘to wish’), aura "weather" (cf. Old French ore, Aromanian avrî), scheiver "carnival", cudesch "book", the last two of which are only found in Romansh. The non-Engadinese dialects retain anceiver ~ entschaiver "to begin", from Latin incipere, otherwise found only in Romanian începe, whereas Surmiran and Engadinese (Putèr, Vallader) and all other Romance languages retain a reflex of Latin *cuminitiāre, e.g. Engadinese (s)cumanzar, Italian cominciare, French commencer. Other examples are memia (adv.) "too much" from Latin nimia (adj., fem.) (otherwise only found in Old Occitan), vess "difficult" from Latin vix "seldom" (cf. Old Spanish abés, Romanian abia < ad vix), and Engadinese encleger "to understand" (vs. non-Engadinese capir), also found in Romanian înțelege and Albanian (n)dëgjoj, from Latin intellegere. Some unique innovations include tedlar "to listen" from Latin titulare and patertgar "to think" from pertractare.

=== Germanic loanwords ===
Another distinguishing characteristic of Romansh vocabulary is its numerous Germanic loanwords.

Some Germanic loan words already entered the language in late antiquity or the Early Middle Ages, and they are often found in other Romance languages as well. Words more particular to Romansh include Surs./ Suts. tschadun, Surm. sdom/sdong, Engad. sdun "spoon", which is also found in Ladin as sciadon and Friulian as sedòn and is thought to go back to Ostrogothic *skeitho, and it was once probably common throughout Northern Italy. Another such early loan is bletsch "wet", which probably goes back to Old Frankish blettjan "to squeeze", from where French blesser "to wound" is also derived. The change in meaning probably occurred by the way of "bruised fruit", as is still found in French blet. Early Germanic loans found more commonly in the other Romance languages includes Surs./Vall. blau, Suts. blo/blova, Surm. blo/blava, Put. blov "blue", which is derived from Germanic blao and also found for instance in French as bleu and Italian as blu.

Others were borrowed into Romansh during the Old High German period, such as glieud "people" from OHG liut or Surs. uaul, Suts. gòld, Surm. gôt, eng. god 'forest' from OHG wald. Surs. baul, Suts. bòld, Engad. bod 'soon, early, nearly' is likely derived from Middle High German bald, balde "keen, fast" as are Surs. nez, Engad. nüz "use" from Middle High German nu(t)z, or losch "proud" likely from Middle High German lôs. Other examples include Surs. schuber "clean" from Swiss German suuber, Surs. schumber "drum" from Swiss German or Middle High German sumber, and Surs. schufar "to drink greedily" from Swiss German suufe.

Some words were adapted into Romansh through different dialects of German, such as the word for "farmer", borrowed as paur from Bavarian in Vallader and Putèr, but from Alemannic as pur in the other dialects.

In addition, many German words entered Romansh beginning in the 19th century, when numerous new objects and ideas were introduced. Romansh speakers often simply adopted the German words, such as il zug "the train" or il banhof "the train station". Language purists attempted to coin new Romansh words instead, which were occasionally successful in entering popular usage. Whereas il tren and la staziun managed to replace il zug and il banhof, other German words have become established in Romansh usage, such as il schalter "the switch", il hebel "the lever", la schlagbohrmaschina "the hammer drill", or in schluc "a sip". Especially noticeable are interjections such as schon, aber or halt, which have become established in everyday language. In a few cases, there was a semantic shift, such as uaffen, "tool", derived from Waffe, "weapon".

== Language contact ==
Romansh speakers have been in close contact with speakers of German dialects such as Alemannic and Bavarian for centuries, as well as speakers of various Italian dialects and Standard German more recently. These languages have influenced Romansh, most strongly the vocabulary, whereas the German and Italian influences on morphology and syntax are much more limited. This means that despite German influence, Romansh has remained a Romance language in its core structure. Romansh linguist Ricarda Liver also notes that an influence of Swiss German on intonation is obvious, in particular in the Sursilvan dialect, even though this has so far not been linguistically studied. The influence of German is generally strongest in the Rhenish varieties Sursilvan, Sutsilvan, and Sursilvan, where French loanwords (frequently not borrowed directly but transmitted through German) are also more numerous. In the dialects of the Engadine, by contrast, the influence of Italian is stronger.

In the Engadinese written languages, Putèr and Vallader, Italian-influenced spellings, learned words, and derivations were previously abundant, for instance in Zaccaria Pallioppi's 1895 dictionary, but came under scrutiny at the start of the 20th century and were gradually eliminated from the written language. Following reforms of the written languages of the Engadine, many of these Italian words fell out of usage (such as contadin 'farmer' instead of paur, nepotin 'nephew' rather than abiadi, ogni 'everyone' instead of inmincha, saimper 'always' instead of adüna, and abbastanza 'enough' instead of avuonda), while others persisted as synonyms of more traditional Ladin words (such as tribunal 'court' alongside drettüra, chapir alongside incleger, and testimoni 'witness' alongside perdütta).

Aside from the written language, everyday Romansh was also influenced by Italian through the large number of emigrants, especially from the Engadine, to Italy, the so-called Randulin. These emigrants often returned with their Romansh speech influenced by Italian.

=== German loanwords ===
German loanwords entered Romansh as early as the Old High German period in the Early Middle Ages, and German has remained an important source of vocabulary since. Many of these words have been in use in Romansh for long enough that German speakers no longer recognize them as German, and for morphological derivations of them to have appeared, in particular through the suffix -egiar ~ iar, as in Surs. baghegiar, sut. biagear, Surm. biagier, Put. biager, Vall. bear "to build", derived from Middle High German bûwen. Other examples include malegiar "to paint" (← malen), schenghegiar "to give (a present)" (← schenken), schazegiar "to estimate" (← schätzen), or Surs. betlegiar (sut. batlagear, Surm./Put. batlager, Vall. supetliar) "to beg", derived from Swiss German bettle with the same meaning. Nouns derived from these verbs include maletg "painting", schenghetg "gift", schazetg "estimation", or bagetg "building". The adjective flissi "hard-working" has given rise to the noun flissiadad "industriousness". The word pur has given rise to derived words such as pura "farmwife, female farmer" or puranchel "small-time farmer", as has buob "boy" from Swiss German bueb "boy", with the derivations buoba "girl" and buobanaglia "crowd of children".

=== Italian, Ladin and Gallo-italic loanwords ===
Common nouns of Italian origin include resposta/risposta "answer", vista/vesta "view", proposta "proposal", surpresa/surpraisa "surprise", and offaisa/offesa "insult". In Ladin, many such nouns are borrowed or derived from Italian and end in –a, whereas the same group of nouns in Sursilvan frequently ends in –iun and where borrowed either from French or formed through analogy with Latin. Examples include pretensiun "opinion, claim" vs. pretaisa, defensiun "defense" vs. defaisa, or confirmaziun "confirmation" vs. conferma.

Other Italian words used throughout Romansh include the words for "nail", which are derived from Italian acuto "sharp", which has yielded Sur. guota, Sut. guta, Surm. gotta, and Ladin guotta/aguotta, whereas the Romansh word for "sharp" itself (Rhenish: git, Ladin agüz) is derived from the same Latin source ACUTUM. Words from Lombard and Venetian related to crafts include Ladin marangun "carpenter" (← Venetian marangon), as opposed to lennari in other Romansh dialects, chazzoula "trowel" (← Lombard cazzola), or filadè "spinning wheel" (← Lombard filadel). Other words include culinary items such as macaruns "macaroni" (← maccheroni); tschiculatta/tschugalata "chocolate" (← cioccolata or Lombard ciculata/cicolata), Ladin and Surmiran limun/limung "lemon" as opposed to Sursilvan citrona (← limone), giabus/baguos "cabbage" (← Lombard gabüs), chanella/canella "cinnamon" (← cannella). In Sursilvan, the word ogna "flat cake" can be found, which is derived from Italian lasagna, with the initial las- having been mistaken for the plural article, and the vowel having been adapted to Sursilvan sound patterns through analogy with words such as muntogna "mountain". Others are words for animals such as lodola "lark" (← lodola) or randulina "swallow" (← Lombard randulina), as well as Ladin scarafagi/scarvatg "beetle" (← scarafaggio). Other Italian words include impostas "taxes" (← imposte; as opposed to Rhenish taglia), radunanza/radunonza "assembly" (← radunanza), Ladin ravarenda "(Protestant) priest" (← reverendo), bambin "Christmas child (giftbringer)" (← Gesù Bambino), marchadant/marcadont "merchant" (← mercatante) or butia/buteia "shop" (← bottega).

In Ladin, Italian borrowings also include words groups not usually borrowed readily. Examples include pronouns such as qualchosa "something" (← qualcosa), listess "the same one" (← Lombard or Venetian l'istess), adverbs such as apunta "exactly" (← appunto), magara/magari "fairly/quite" (← magari), prepositions like dürant/duront "during" (← durante) and malgrà/malgrad "despite" (← malgrado), and conjunctions such as però "but" (← però) and fin cha 'until' (← finché). Most of these are confined to Ladin, with some exceptions such as Sursilvan magari, duront, and malgrad.

=== Germanic calques ===
Aside from outright loanwords, the German influence on Romansh often takes the form of calques, where Romanic vocabulary has taken on the meaning of German words, summed up by Italian dialect olog ist Graziadio Isaia Ascoli in 1880 as "materia romana e spirito tedesco" ("Roman body and German soul"). The earliest examples go back to Carolingian times and show the influence of Germanic law. Such words include tschentament "statute", a derivation of the verb tschentar (from Latin *sedentare "to sit") as an analogy to Middle High German satzunge or Surs./sut./Surm. lètg, Put. alach, Vall. lai "marriage", derived from Latin legem (accusative singular of lēx "law"), with the meaning of Middle High German ê, ewe. A more recent example of a loan translation is the verb tradir "to betray", which has taken on the additional meaning of German verraten of "to give away" as in tradir in secret "to give away a secret", originally covered by the verb revelar.

Particularly common are combinations of verbs with locative adverbs, such as vegnir cun "to accompany" (literally "to come with"), vegnir anavos "to come back", far cun "to participate" (literally "to do with"), far giu "to agree on" (literally "to do down"), or grodar tras "to fail" (literally "to fall through"). Whereas such verbs also occur sporadically in other Romance languages as in French prendre avec "to take along" or Italian andare via "to go away", the large number in Romansh suggests an influence of German, where this pattern is common. However, prepositional verbs are also common in the (Romance) Lombard language spoken in the bordering Swiss and Italian regions. The verbs far cun "to participate" or grodar tras "to fail" for example, are direct equivalents of German mitmachen (from mit "with" and machen "to do") and durchfallen (from durch "through" and fallen "to fall").

Less integrated into the Romansh verbal system are constructions following the pattern of far il ("doing the") + a German infinitive. Examples include far il löten "to solder", far il würzen "to season", or far il vermissen "to miss, to feel the absence of".

German also often serves as a model for the creation of new words. An example is Surs. tschetschapuorla "vacuum cleaner", a compound of tschitschar "to suck" and puorla "dust", following the model of German Staubsauger – the Italian word, aspirapolvere possibly being itself a calque on the German word. The Engadinese dialects on the other hand have adopted aspiradur from Italian aspiratore, which, however, does not mean "vacuum cleaner". A skyscraper, which is a direct loan translation from English in many Romance languages (as in French gratte-ciel, Italian grattacielo), is a loan translation of German Wolkenkratzer (literally "cloud-scraper") in Sursilvan: il sgrattaneblas (from sgrattar "to scratch" and neblas "clouds"). The Engadinese varieties again follow the Italian pattern of sgrattatschêl (from tschêl "sky"). A more recent word is la natelnumra "the cell phone number", which follows the word order of Swiss German Natelnummer, and is found alongside la numra da natel.

Examples of idiomatic expressions include Surs. dar in canaster, Engad. dar ün dschierl, a direct translation of German einen Korb geben, literally meaning "to hand a basket", but used in the sense of "turning down a marriage proposal" or esser ligiongia ad enzatgi, a loan translation of the German expression jemandem Wurst sein, literally meaning "to be sausage to someone" but meaning "not cared about, to be unimportant".

=== Morphosyntax ===
Apart from vocabulary, the influence of German is noticeable in grammatical constructions, which are sometimes closer to German than to other Romance languages.

For instance, Romansh is the only Romance language in which indirect speech is formed using the subjunctive mood, as in Sursilvan El di ch'el seigi malsauns, Putèr El disch ch'el saja amalo, "He says that he is sick", as compared to Italian Dice che è malato or French Il dit qu'il est malade. Ricarda Liver attributes this to the influence of German. Limited to Sursilvan is the insertion of entire phrases between auxiliary verbs and participles as in Cun Mariano Tschuor ha Augustin Beeli discurriu "Mariano Tschuor has spoken with Augustin Beeli" as compared to Engadinese Cun Rudolf Gasser ha discurrü Gion Peider Mischol "Rudolf Gasser has spoken with Gion Peider Mischol".

In contemporary spoken language, adjective forms are often not distinguished from adverbs, as in Sursilvan Jeu mon direct "I am going directly", rather than Jeu mon directamein. This usage is rare in most other Romance languages with a few sporadic exceptions as in French parler haut or Italian vosà fort "speak aloud", and the common usage in colloquial Romansh is likely an influence from German.

Especially noticeable and often criticized by language purists are particles such as aber, schon, halt, grad, eba, or zuar, which have become an integral part of everyday Romansh speech, especially in Sursilvan.

Negation was originally formed by a double negative in all Romansh dialects. Today, this usage is limited to Surmiran as in ia na sa betg "I do not know" (it has also been included in panregional Rumantsch Grischun). While the first particle was lost in Sursilvan, where negation is now formed only with buc as in jeu sai buc, the Ladin varieties lost the second particle brich(a), apparently under the influence of Italian, as in Putér eau nu se.

=== Romansh influences on German ===
The influence of Romansh on the local vernacular German has not been studied as thoroughly as vice versa. Apart from place names throughout the former speech area of Romansh, only a handful of Romansh words have become part of wider German usage. Such words include Gletscher "glacier" or Murmeltier "marmot" (derived from Romansh murmunt), as well as culinary items such as Maluns or Capuns. The Romansh influence is much stronger in the German dialects of Grisons. It is sometimes controversially suspected that the pronunciation /k/ or /h/ in words such as Khind and bahe, as opposed to /x/ in other Swiss German dialects (Chind and bache), is an influence of Romansh.

In morphosyntax, the use of the auxiliary verb kho "to come" as opposed to wird "will" in phrases such as leg di warm a, sunscht khunscht krank ("put on warm clothes, otherwise you will get sick") in Grisons-German is sometimes attributed to Romansh, as well as the lack of a distinction between the accusative and dative case in some Grisons-German dialects and the word order in phrases such as i tet froge jemand wu waiss ("I would ask someone who knows"). In addition, some words, neuter in most dialects of German, are masculine in Grisons-German. Examples include der Brot "the bread" or der Gäld "the money". Common words of Romansh origin in Grisons-German include Spus/Spüslig "bridegroom" and Spus "bride", Banitsch "cart used for moving dung", and Pon "container made of wood". In areas where Romansh either is still spoken or has disappeared recently, Romansh words are even more common in the local dialects of German.

=== Attitudes towards language contact ===
The influence of German has been seen in different ways by linguists and language activists. The Italian dialectologist Ascoli for instance described Romansh as "a body that has lost its soul and taken on an entirely foreign one in its place" in the 1880s. This opinion was shared by many, who saw the influence of German as a threat to and corruption of Romansh, often referring to it as a disease infecting Romansh. This view was prevalent until after World War II, with many contemporary linguists and activists by contrast seeing these loan elements as completely natural and as an integral part of Romansh, which should be seen as an enrichment of the language. This position is currently held among others by the language activists Bernard Cathomas, Iso Camartin, or Alexi Decurtins, who argue for a relaxed attitude towards loan elements, which they point out are often among the most down-to-earth elements of the language, and that the dual nature of Romansh can also be seen as an advantage in being open to cultural elements from both sides. This position is also shared by several contemporary authors in particular from the Surselva, such as Arno Camenisch, who makes heavy use of Germanisms in his works.

== Literature, music and media ==
Romansh had a rich oral tradition before the appearance of Romansh writing, but apart from songs such as the Canzun da Sontga Margriata, virtually none of it survives. Prior to the 16th century, Romansh writings are known from only a few fragments, although the Swiss Literary Archives do have a number of collections of Romansh literature, spanning from the late 19th to the early 21st century.

The oldest known written records of Romansh dating from the period before 1500 are:

- the Würzburg manuscript (10th century);
- the Einsiedeln Homily dates from the early 12th century, discovered in 1907, and consists of a few lines, in an early form of the Romonsch dialect, of interlinear translation (with the original Latin text) of a sermon attributed to St Augustine;
- the Müstair linguistic monument dated 1389 and consisting of a fragment of a document about grazing rights on common land in the Val Müstair, it is a court testimony in Romansh attested in an otherwise Latin document:

Introekk in sum la vall de Favergatscha et introekk eintt la vall da Vafergatscha; la e vcinn faitt una puntt chun dis punt alta
e chun dis eintt feder Vinayr

As far up as the Favergatscha valley and into the Vafergatscha valley. There where they are building a bridge which they call punt alta
and what they call eintt feder Vinayr".

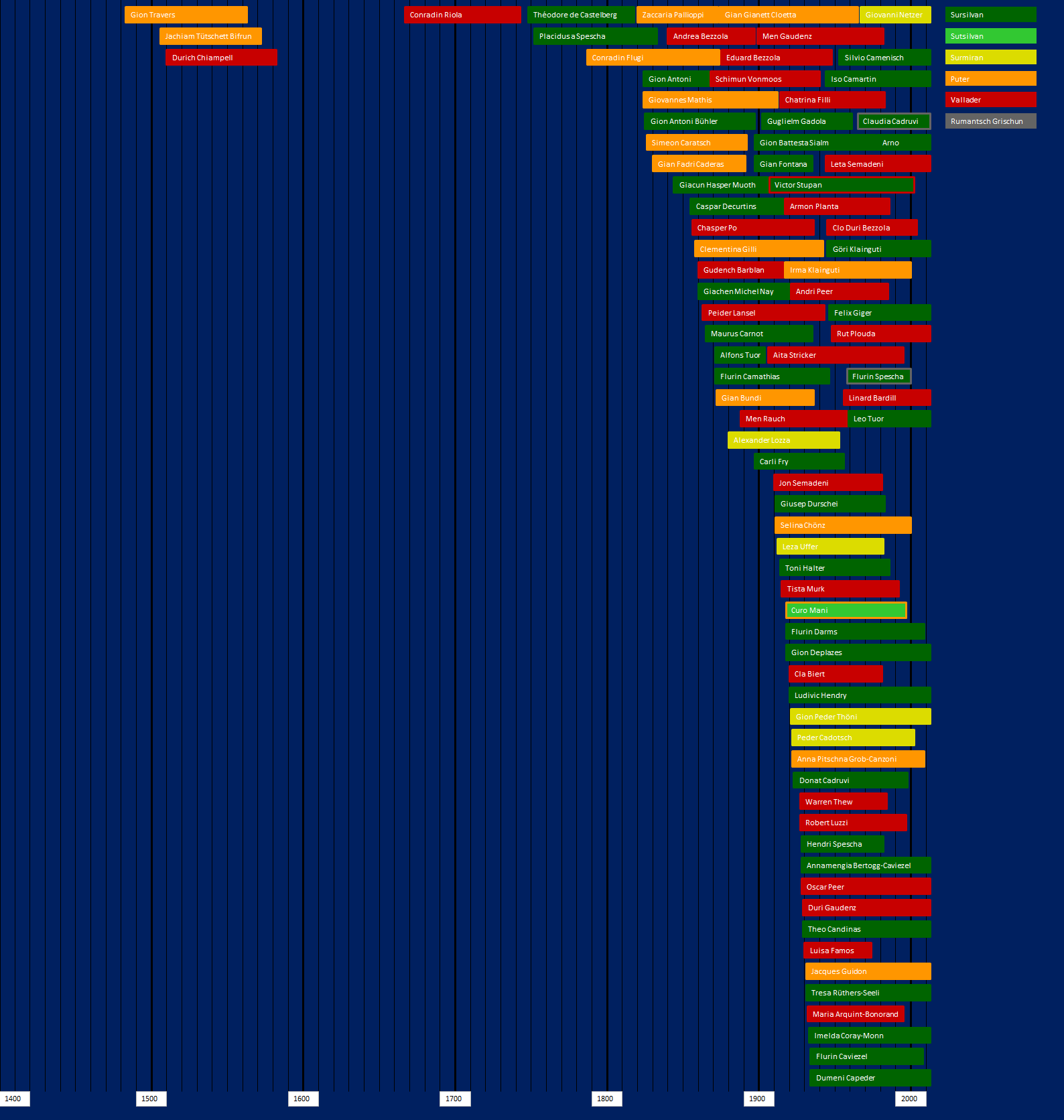
Synopsis on Romansh authors, by birth and idiom (including Rumantsch Grischun)

The first substantial surviving work in Romansh is the Chianzun dalla guerra dagl Chiaste da Müs written in the Putèr dialect in 1527 by Gian Travers. It is an epic poem describing the First Musso war which Travers himself had taken part in.

Subsequent works usually have religious themes, including Bible translations, manuals for religious instructions, and biblical plays. In 1560, the first Romansh translation of the New Testament: L'g Nuof Sainc Testamaint da nos Signer Jesu Christ by Giachem Bifrun, was published. Two years later, in 1562, another writer from the Engadine, Durich Chiampel, published the Cudesch da Psalms, a collection of Romansh church songs in the Vallader dialect. In the Sursilvan dialect, the first surviving works are also religious works such as catechism by Daniel Bonifaci, and in 1611 Ilg Vêr Sulaz da pievel giuvan ("The true joys of young people"), a series of religious instructions for Protestant youths was published by Steffan Gabriel. Four years later in 1615, a Catholic catechism Curt Mussament was published in response, written by Gion Antoni Calvenzano. The first translation of the New Testament into Sursilvan was published in 1648 by the son of Steffan Gabriel, Luci Gabriel. The first complete translation of the Bible, the Bibla da Cuera was published between 1717 and 1719.

In music, choirs have a long tradition in the Romansh-speaking areas. Apart from traditional music and song, Romansh is also used in contemporary pop or hip-hop music, some of which has become known outside the Romansh-speaking regions, for instance, in the Eurovision Song Contest 1989, Switzerland was represented by a Romansh song, Viver senza tei. Since 2004, the hip-hop group Liricas Analas has become known even outside of Grisons through their Romansh songs. Other contemporary groups include the rock-band Passiunai with its lead singer Pascal Gamboni, or the rock/pop band The Capoonz. Composer Gion Antoni Derungs has written three operas with Romansh librettos: Il cerchel magic (1986), Il semiader (1998) and Tredeschin (2000).

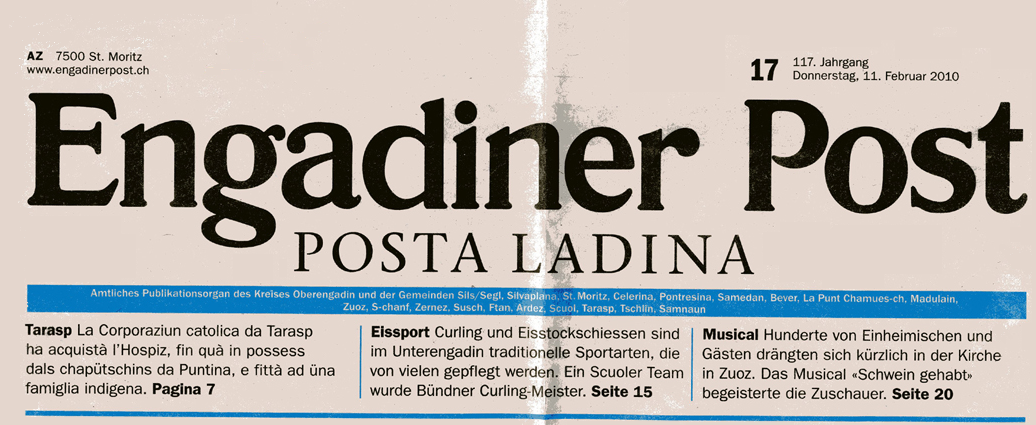
Front page of the Engadiner Post/Posta Ladina in February 2010

Romansh is used to varying extents in newspapers, the radio, and television. Radio and television broadcasts in Romansh are produced by the Radiotelevisiun Svizra Rumantscha, which is part of the Swiss public broadcasting company SRG SSR. The radio Radio Rumantsch broadcasts a 24-hour program including informational and music broadcasts. The broadcasters generally speak their own regional dialect on the air, which is considered a key factor in familiarizing Romansh speakers with the dialects outside their home region. News broadcasts are generally in the pan-regional variety Rumantsch Grischun. The two local radio stations Radio Grischa and Radio Engiadina occasionally broadcast in Romansh, but primarily use German. The Televisiun Rumantscha airs regular broadcasts on SF 1, which are subtitled in German. Programs include the informational broadcast Telesguard, which is broadcast daily from Monday to Friday. The children's show Minisguard and the informational broadcast Cuntrasts are aired on weekends. Additionally, the shows Controvers, Pled sin via, and others are broadcast during irregular intervals.

The Romansh newspapers used to be heavily fragmented by regions and dialects. The more long-lived newspapers included the Gasetta Romontscha in the Surselva, the Fögl Ladin in the Engadine, Casa Paterna/La Punt in the Sutselva, and La Pagina da Surmeir in the Surmeir. Due to financial difficulties, most of these merged into a pan-regional daily newspaper called La Quotidiana in 1997. This newspaper includes articles in all five dialects and in Rumantsch Grischun. Apart from La Quotidiana, La Pagina da Surmeir continues to be published to a regional audience, and the Engadiner Post includes two pages in Romansh. A Romansh news agency, the Agentura da Novitads Rumantscha, has been in existence since 1997.

Several Romansh-language magazines are also published regularly, including the youth magazine Punts and the yearly publications Calender Romontsch and Chalender Ladin.

In September 2018, Amur senza fin, the first-ever Romansh-language television film, debuted on Swiss national television.

== Sample text ==
The fable "The Fox and the Crow" by Aesop with a French version by Jean de La Fontaine; translated into the Dachsprache Rumantsch Grischun and all six dialects of Romansh: Sursilvan, Sutsilvan, Surmiran, Puter, and the similar-looking but noticeably different-sounding dialects Vallader and Jauer, as well as a translation into English.

Rumantsch Grischun audio	Sursilvan audio	Sutsilvan	Surmiran
La vulp era puspè ina giada fomentada. Qua ha ella vis sin in pign in corv che tegneva in toc chaschiel en ses pichel. Quai ma gustass, ha ella pensà, ed ha clamà al corv: «Tge bel che ti es! Sche tes chant è uschè bel sco tia parita, lur es ti il pli bel utschè da tuts».	L'uolp era puspei inagada fomentada. Cheu ha ella viu sin in pegn in tgaper che teneva in toc caschiel en siu bec. Quei gustass a mi, ha ella tertgau, ed ha clamau al tgaper: «Tgei bi che ti eis! Sche tiu cant ei aschi bials sco tia cumparsa, lu eis ti il pli bi utschi da tuts».	La gualp eara puspe egn'eada fumantada. Qua â ella vieu sen egn pegn egn corv ca taneva egn toc caschiel ainten sieus pecel. Quegl gustass a mei, â ella tartgieu, ed ha clamo agli corv: «Tge beal ca tei es! Scha tieus tgànt e aschi beal sco tia pareta, alura es tei igl ple beal utschi da tuts».	La golp era puspe eneda famantada. Co ò ella via sen en pegn en corv tgi tigniva en toc caschiel an sies pecal. Chegl am gustess, ò ella panso, ed ò clamo agl corv: «Tge bel tgi te ist! Schi ties cant è schi bel scu tia parentscha, alloura ist te igl pi bel utschel da tots».

Putèr audio	Vallader audio	Jauer	Translation
La vuolp d'eira darcho üna vouta famanteda. Co ho'la vis sün ün pin ün corv chi tgnaiva ün töch chaschöl in sieu pical. Que am gustess, ho'la penso, ed ho clamo al corv: «Che bel cha tü est! Scha tieu chaunt es uschè bel scu tia apparentscha, alura est tü il pü bel utschè da tuots».	La vuolp d'eira darcheu üna jada fomantada. Qua ha'la vis sün ün pin ün corv chi tgnaiva ün toc chaschöl in seis pical. Quai am gustess, ha'la pensà, ed ha clomà al corv: «Che bel cha tü est! Scha teis chant es uschè bel sco tia apparentscha, lura est tü il plü bel utschè da tuots».	La uolp d'era darchiau üna jada fomantada. Qua ha'la vis sün ün pin ün corv chi tegnea ün toc chaschöl in ses pical. Quai ma gustess, ha'la s'impissà, ed ha clomà al corv: «Cha bel cha tü esch! Scha tes chaunt es ischè bel sco tia apparentscha, lura esch tü il pü bel utschè da tots».	The fox was hungry yet again. There, he saw a raven upon a fir holding a piece of cheese in its beak. This I would like, he thought, and shouted at the raven: "You are so beautiful! If your singing is as beautiful as your looks, then you are the most beautiful of all birds."

The numbers one to ten across the different dialects of Romansh, alongside the English and Latin translation:

English	Latin	Rumantsch Grischun	Sursilvan	Sutsilvan	Surmiran	Putèr	Vallader
one	ūnus	in, ina	in, ina	egn, egna, egn'	egn, egna	ün, üna	ün, üna
two	duo	dus, duas	dus, duas	dus, duas	dus	dus	dus
three	trēs	trais	treis	tres	treis	trais	trais
four	quattuor	quatter	quater	quater	quatter	quatter	quatter
five	quīnque	tschintg	tschun	tschentg	tschintg	tschinch	tschinch
six	sex	sis	sis	sis	seis	ses	ses
seven	septem	set	siat	seat	set	set	set
eight	octō	otg	otg	otg	otg	och	ot
nine	novem	nov	nov	nov	nov	nouv	nouv
ten	decem	diesch	diesch	diesch	diesch	desch	desch

- Romance languages
- Societad Retorumantscha
