= Romansh people =

Swiss ethnic group

Romansh
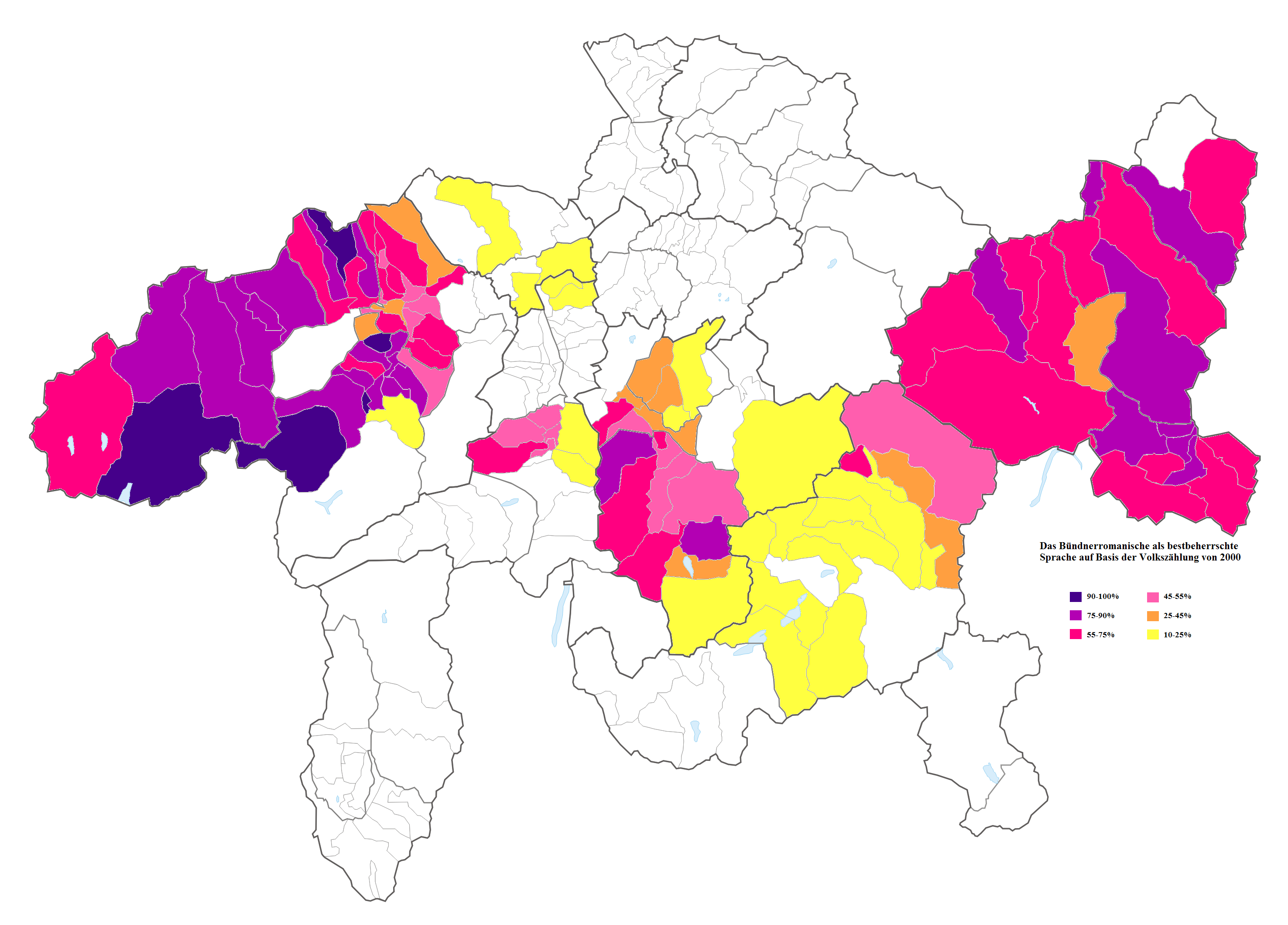
- Proportion of people declaring Romansh as their "language of best command" in Grisons (municipalities with more than 10% are shown), as of 2000.

Total population
- c. 45,000

Regions with significant populations
- Grisons: c. 40,000 (2017)
- Zurich: c. 5,000 (2017)

Languages
- Romansh, Swiss German

Religion
- Christianity (majority Roman Catholic, Swiss Reformed)

Related ethnic groups
- other Swiss; Friulians, Ladins, Lombards (Insubrians, Orobians)

The Romansh people (also spelled Romansch, Rumantsch, or Romanche; Romansh: rumantschs, rumàntschs, romauntschs or romontschs) are a Romance ethnic group who are native to the Swiss canton of Grisons (Graubünden) and speak the Romansh language.

The Romansh speaking population is collectively known as Rumantschia in Romansh (alternatively rumantschadad, Vallader: rumantschità, Sursilvan: romontschadad). This term has come to replace the German official legal term of "Gemeinschaft der Bündner Romanen" introduced in 1982.

As of 2017, they make up about 45,000 inhabitants of Switzerland, or 0.85% of its population, and about 30,000 inhabitants of the canton of Grisons (14.7% of its population).

== History ==
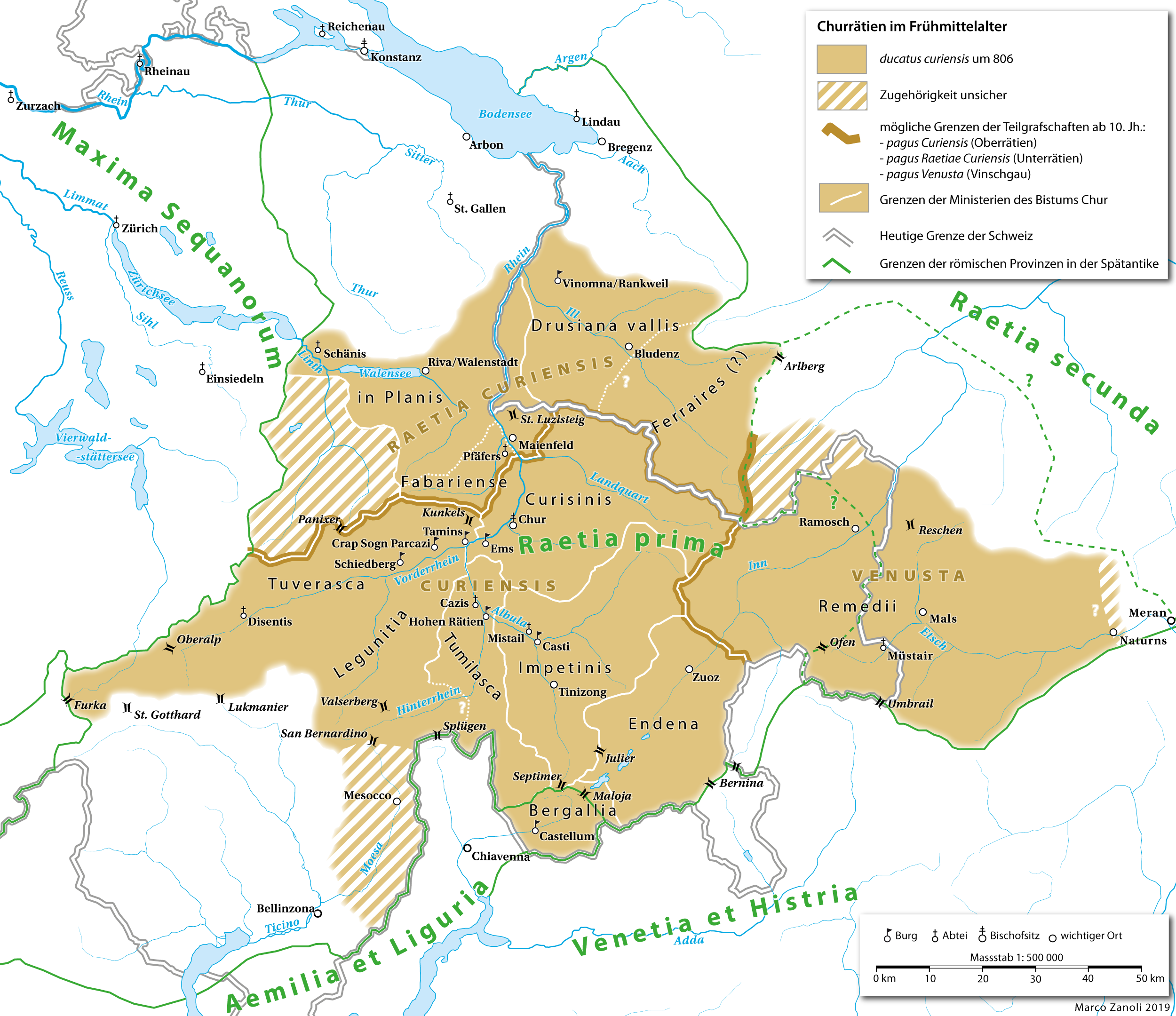
Approximate extent of Raetia Curiensis in the 10th century.

The territory of Switzerland was Romanized in the 1st to 3rd centuries AD, and its population spoke a form of Vulgar Latin by the time of the collapse of the Western Roman Empire in the 5th century. The province of Raetia prima, established c. 300 (under Diocletian) became known as Raetia Curiensis, ruled by the bishops of Chur throughout the 5th to 12th centuries (albeit nominally part of the Duchy of Swabia from the 10th century). This included Sarganserland (now Canton of St. Gallen), as far as Lake Walen and the Linth River, the Ill basin in what is now Vorarlberg, and the upper Vinschgau in what is now South Tyrol.

Rhaeto-Romance linguistic unity broke down from the end of the Carolingian period, with the establishment of the imperial counties of Werdenberg and Tyrol to the north and east, and the March of Verona to the south. Nominally under Frankish rule from the 6th century, the local bishops of Chur still retained de facto control. In the mid-8th century a surviving Lex Romana Curiensis, a "Roman Law of Chur", was an abbreviated epitome of the Breviary of Alaric. After the last Victorid bishop, Tello of Chur, died in 765, King Charlemagne issued a document of protection declaring Tello's successors his vassals. From the 770s onwards, Charlemagne appointed the bishops of Chur himself, increasing Frankish control over the territory. Upon Bishop Remedius's death in 806/7, he legislated a division between episcopal and comital property, ending the de facto secular rule of the Chur bishops. He appointed Hunfriding counts, but the ecclesiastical and secular claims to power remained a source of contention. The Hunfriding count Burchard II proclaimed himself a duke of Swabia in 917.

In the high medieval period, with the advance of Alemannic Germans, the linguistic boundary of Latin (Romance) speakers was pushed back to what became Grisons (the Three Leagues). Sargans was part of the county of Werdenberg from the 12th century. The territory of Grisons, the southern part of Raetia Curiensis (in the medieval period known as Upper Raetia, Raetia superior, Oberrätien) remained predominantly Latin-speaking throughout the early modern period (with the exception of the high pastures settled by the Walser).

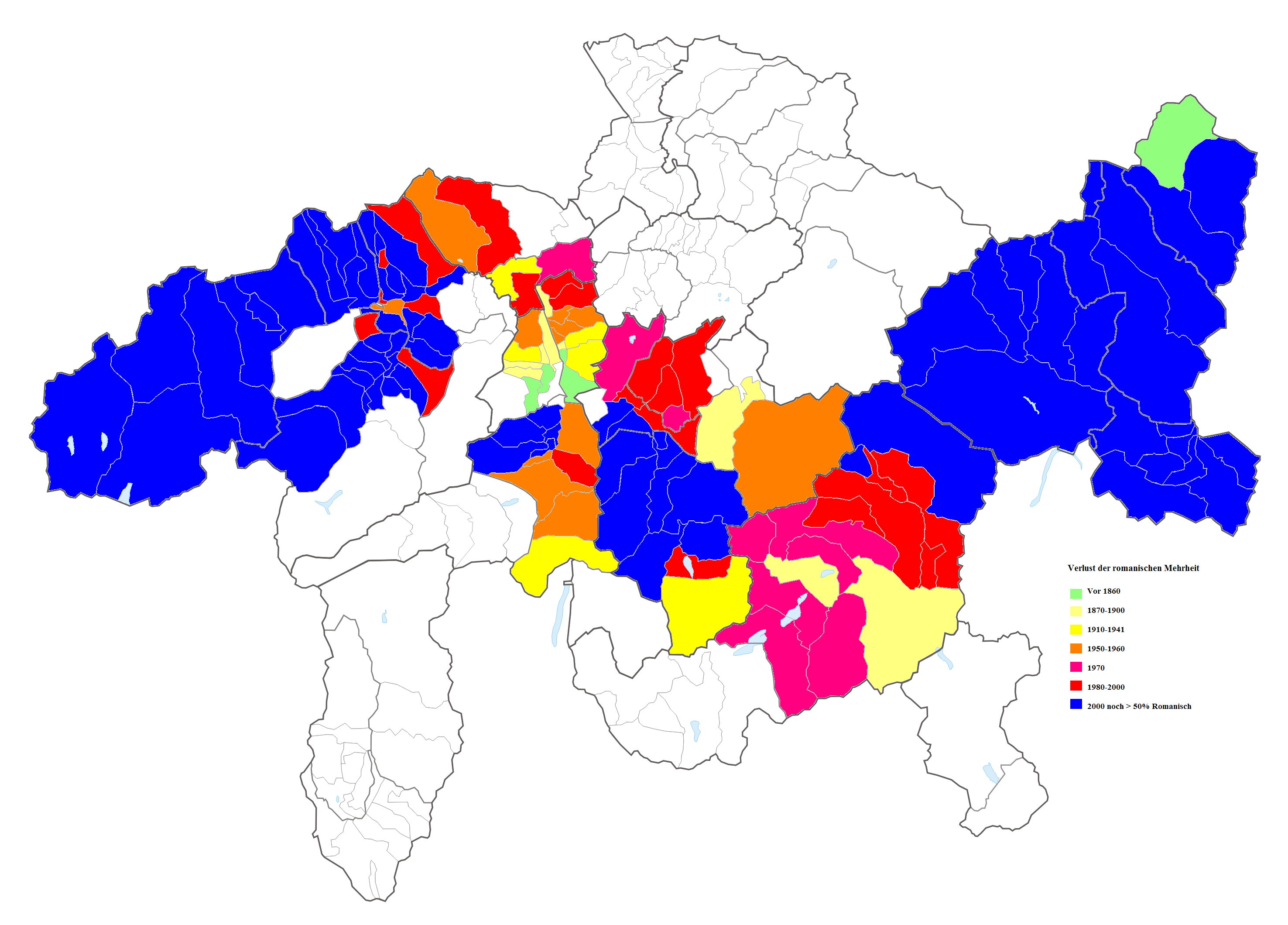
Loss of Romansh-speaking majority since 1860 by municipality (municipalities retaining a Romansh-speaking majority as of the 2000 census are shown in blue)

When Grisons became part of Switzerland in 1803, it had a population of roughly 73,000, of whom around 36,600 were Romansh speakers—many of them monolingual—living mostly in the Romansh-speaking valleys. The number of Romansh speakers has remained roughly constant since that time (while the population of Switzerland has nearly quintupled).

The language border with German, which had mostly been stable since the 16th century, began moving again as more villages shifted to German. One cause was the admission of Grisons as a Swiss canton, which brought Romansh speakers into more frequent contact with German speakers. Another was the increased power of the central government of Grisons, which used German as its administrative language. Some people even welcomed the disappearance of Romansh, especially progressives. In their eyes, Romansh was an obstacle to the Romansh people's economic and intellectual development.

In 1880, the Romansh-speaking area formed a single continuous geographical unit. But by the end of the century, the so-called "Central-Grisons language bridge" began to disappear. Rumantschia lost its contiguity in the early 20th century, with the weakening of Sutsilvan in the Posterior Rhine valley.

Sutsilvan is now limited to some 1,000 speakers concentrated in a language island on the left bank of the Posterior Rhine, centered on Casti-Wergenstein (the former Schams subdistrict).

In the mid-to-late 19th century a revival movement began, often called the "Rhaeto-Romansh renaissance". In 1919, the Lia Rumantscha was founded as an umbrella organization for the various regional language societies. In 1937, the Swiss government proposed recognizing Romansh as Switzerland's fourth national language (alongside German, French and Italian). The political background for this was the irredentist propaganda by Fascist Italy, which claimed Grisons along with the Ticino as ethnically Italian territory. In a popular vote on 20 February 1938, a majority of 91.6% voted to recognize Romansh as an official language for use in the canton of Grisons.

== Contemporary situation ==
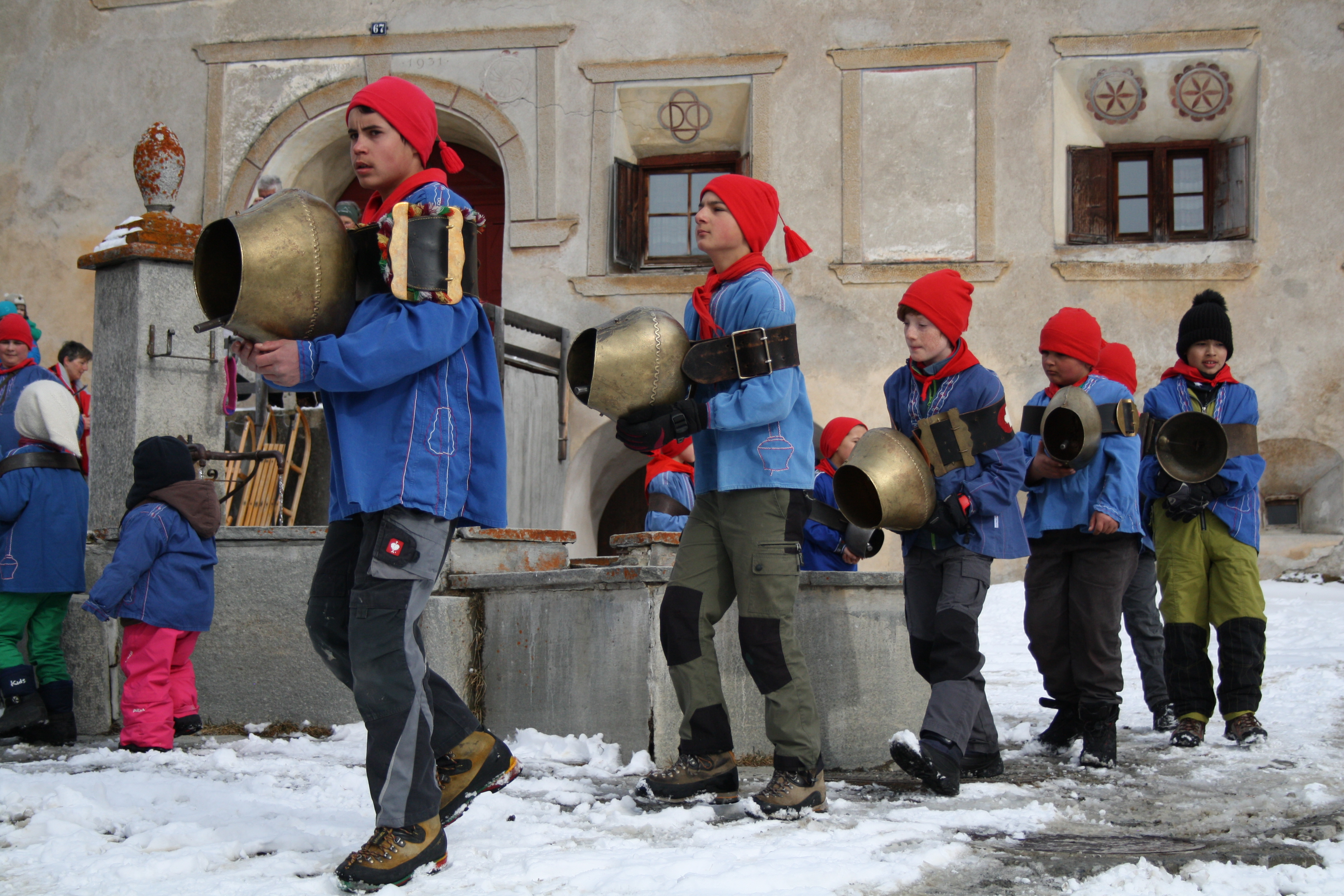
Chalandamarz is a traditional festival in the Engadin, Val Mustair, Surmeir/Albula and formerly the Posterior Rhine valley region, as well as in the Italian-speaking parts of Grisons (Poschiavo, Bregaglia, Mesolcina); it is not known in the Surselva region.

In the late 1980s and 1990s, debate about Switzerland's role in what became the European Union prompted a reawakening of "the long-dormant Romansh national movement". Elements within this movement advocated a transfer of sovereignty from the Swiss Confederation to a future Federal Europe. A 1996 referendum strengthened the status of Romansh in Switzerland, permitting its use at the federal level.

There is no general sense of unity within "Rumantschia" due to regional separation and dialectal variations. Rumantsch Grischun was an attempt launched in the 1980s to introduce a standard version of Rumantsch, but acceptance of this standard has been limited. There are instead five written dialects, each with its own orthography: Sursilvan, Sutsilvan, Surmiran, Putèr and Vallader.

As of 2000, areas with a majority of native Rumantsch speakers were separated into four disconnected parts: Surselva (Sursilvan, Tuatschin), Schams (Sutsilvan), Albula/Surmeir (Surmiran) and Engadin with Val Müstair (Putèr, Vallader, Jauer).

A renewed effort to introduce course material in Rumantsch Grischun for primary education was started in 2006. A cantonal law of 2006 aims to preserve the trilingual (Romansh, Italian, German) character of Grisons. It prescribes that primary schools, public signage and correspondence by the municipal authorities are to be exclusively in the historically predominant language as long as this language is spoken by at least 40% of the population.

In cases where the population speaking the historically predominant language numbers between 20% and 40%, municipal authorities are obliged to offer official communication and primary education in this language alongside the majority language.

In cases where the fraction of Romansh or Italian speakers is between 10% and 20%, authorities are obliged as a minimum to offer Romansh or Italian as a subject in primary education.

== People ==
- H. R. Giger (1940–2014), painter, sculptor, set designer, film director
- Salis family (Soglio)
  - Carl Ulisses von Salis-Marschlins (1762–1818)
  - Meta von Salis (1855–1929)
- Planta family (Upper Engadin)
  - Thomas Planta, bishop of Chur (r. 1549–1565)
  - Alfred von Planta (1857–1922)
  - British librarian and diplomat Joseph Planta (1744–1827) was born at Castasegna, the son of Reverend Andrew (Andreas) Planta (1717–1773). The family moved to London in 1752.
- Jörg Jenatsch (1596–1639), political leader during the Thirty Years' War

== People of partial Romansh descent ==
- Eugene Luther Vidal (1895–1969), American commercial aviation pioneer, New Deal official, inventor, and athlete
- Gore Vidal (1925–2012), American writer and intellectual
- Jim Caviezel (b. 1968), American actor best known for portraying Jesus Christ in the 2004 film The Passion of the Christ
- Nate Bargatze (b. 1979), American comedian

== See also ==
- Swiss people
- Languages of Switzerland
- Questione Ladina
- Raeti
- Raetic language
- Rhaeto-Romance languages
