= Hinterrhein (river) =

River in Switzerland

Hinterrhein Posterior Rhine
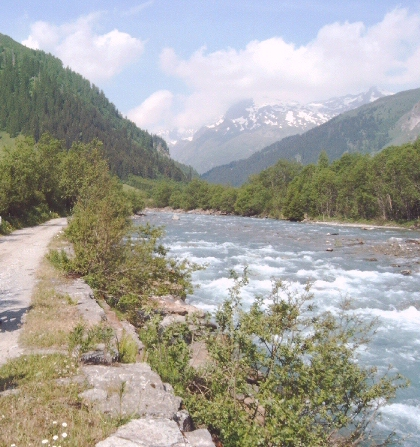
- The Hinterrhein southwest of Splügen

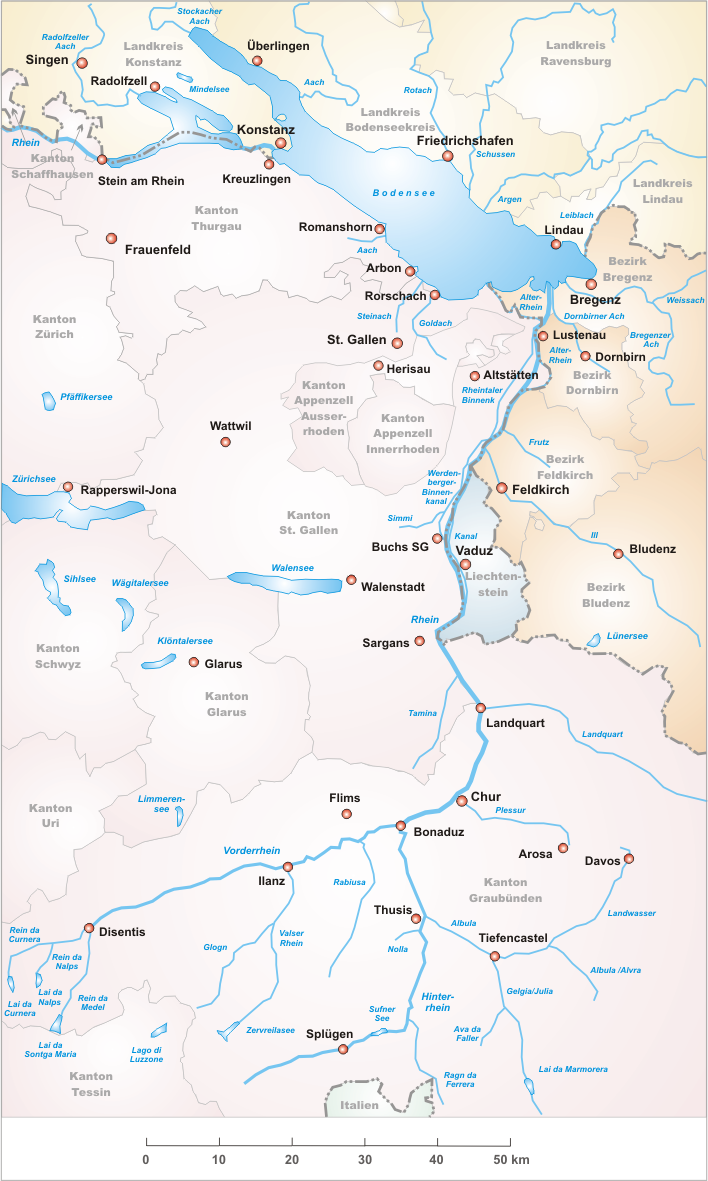
- Native name: Ragn Posteriur (Sutsilvan); Rein Posteriur (Sursilvan); Rain Posteriur (Rumantsch Grischun); Hinterrhein (German)

Location
- Country: Switzerland
- Canton: Grisons

Physical characteristics
- Source
  - coordinates: 46°29′55″N 9°3′45″E
  - elevation: 2,400 m (7,900 ft)
- Mouth
  - coordinates: 46°49′24″N 9°24′28″E
  - elevation: 585 m (1,919 ft)
- Length: 64 km (40 mi)
- Basin size: 1,693 km^{2} (654 sq mi)
- Discharge
  - average: 59.6 m^{3}/s (2,100 cu ft/s)

Basin features
- Progression: Rhine→ North Sea
- River system: Rhine
- Tributaries
  - right: Ragn da Ferrera, Albula/Alvra
- Waterbodies: Sufner See

The Hinterrhein (German: [ˈhɪntɐˌʁaɪn]; Sutsilvan: Ragn Posteriur; Sursilvan: Rein Posteriur; Rumantsch Grischun, Vallader, and Puter: Rain Posteriur; Surmiran: Ragn posteriour; Italian: Reno Posteriore), or Posterior Rhine, is the right of the two initial tributaries of the Rhine (the other being the Vorderrhein). It is located in the canton of Grisons (Graubünden), Switzerland. One of its upper tributaries is Reno di Lei, which is the outflow of Lago di Lei located in Lombardy, Italy.

Although it is shorter in length, its volume is larger than that of the Vorderrhein at their confluence near Reichenau, after which the river is called the Alpine Rhine, which flows out into Lake Constance (Bodensee).

== Course ==
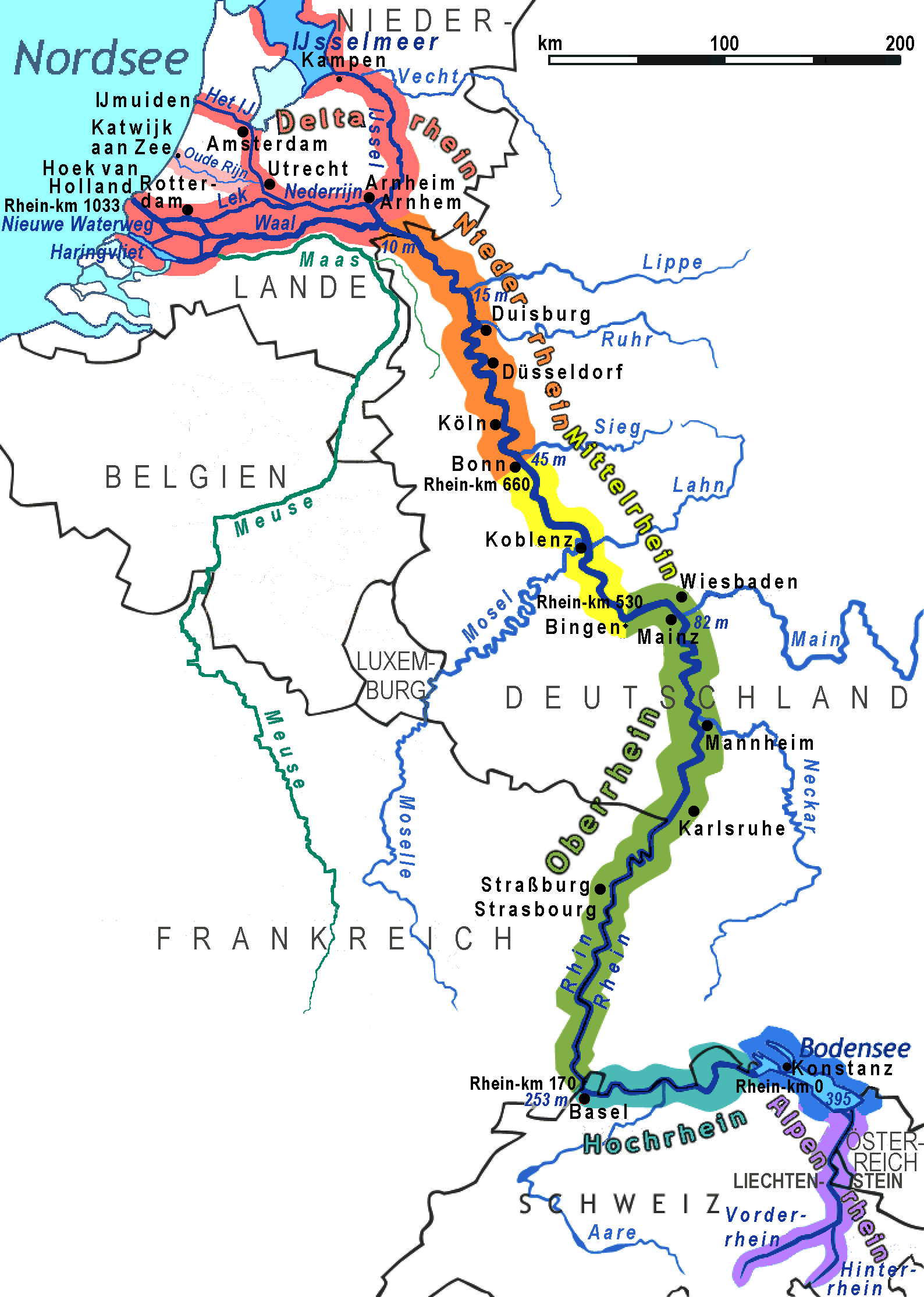
Sections of the Rhine: Rhine–Meuse–Scheldt delta Lower Rhine Middle Rhine Upper Rhine High Rhine Lake Constance (Untersee, Seerhein, Obersee) Alpine Rhine, Vorderrhein, Hinterrhein Rhine sources

Flowing from the village Hinterrhein near the San Bernardino Pass through the Rheinwald valley, the river flows into a gorge called Rofla Gorge (Roflaschlucht). In this gorge, an equal-sized tributary, the Avers Rhine, adds waters from the deep Val Ferrera and the very remote alp of Avers and its side valley Valle di Lei, located on Italian territory. Below the Rofla Gorge, the valley widens into a section called Schams. The Hinterrhein then reaches Andeer, before passing through another gorge, the Viamala, before arriving at Thusis. Now, another tributary of slightly bigger volume reaches the Hinterrhein, the Albula, coming from the Albula Pass, which is also the name of a railway line that has become a UNESCO world heritage. The two main tributaries of the Albula are the Landwasser, flowing through Davos, and the Gelgia from the Julier pass area.

After passing Rothenbrunnen through a valley called Domleschg (a valley with an incredible number of castles, showing the importance of transit in the area) the Hinterrhein is again left alone from civilisation in the floodplain Isla Bella near Rhäzüns, before it joins the Anterior Rhine (Vorderrhein) at Reichenau, near Bonaduz.

The drainage basin of the Hinterrhein lies mostly within the canton of Grisons, with one tributary, the Reno di Lei rising in Lombardy, Italy (Sondrio). The nearby Lunghin Pass is the triple divide between the rivers Rhine, Danube and Po.

== Significance ==
To learn about the importance of travel along the Hinterrhein, a multiday trekking route is signposted along the river from Thusis to Splügen, where it turns south to Splügen Pass, a historically important transit route to Italy. Nowadays there is no traffic across the Splügen pass in winter, whereas the route across its age-old rival, the San Bernardino Pass, was given a long road tunnel in 1967 that made it possible to keep the road open all year.

== See also ==
- List of rivers of Switzerland
- Sources of the Rhine
