= Tuatschin dialect =

Dialect of the Romansh language

- tuatschin
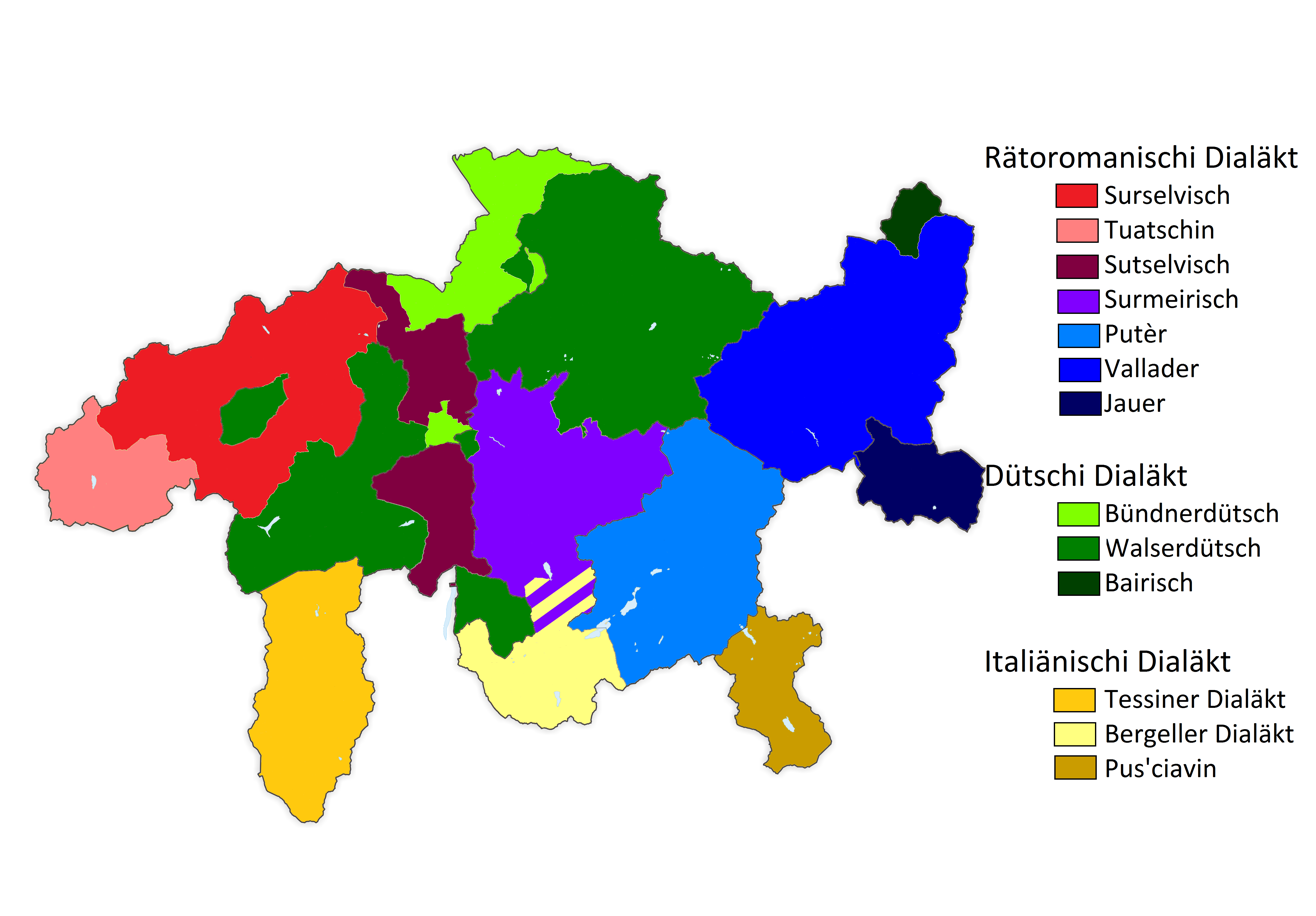
- Historical distribution of the dialects of Romansh, German, and Italian in Graubünden
- Native to: Cadi; Tujetsch; Val Medel
- Language family: Indo-European: Italic; Latino-Faliscan; Romance; Italo-Western; Western Romance; Gallo-Romance; Rhaeto-Romance or Gallo-Rhaetian; Romansh; Tuatschin dialect

Language codes
- ISO 639-3: –

Tuatschin is a variant of the Sursilvan dialect of the Romansh that is spoken in Cadi, Tujetsch, and Val Medel.

This dialect is markedly different from Sursilvan.
