= Romansh =

Romansh (also spelled Romansch, Rumansch and Rumantsch) may refer to:

- Romansh language, a Romance language of the Rhaeto-Romance group, spoken in southeastern Switzerland
- Romansh people, people who speak this language

== See also ==
- Romance languages, the group of languages derived from Latin.
