= Avers Rhine =

River in Switzerland

Avers Rhine German: Averser Rhein
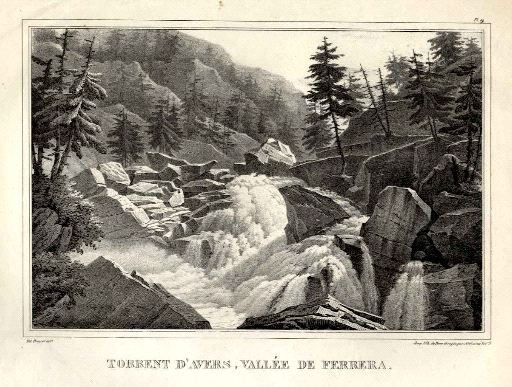
- The Avers Rhine in Val Ferrera valley, lithograph from 1827
- Native name: Ragn da Ferrera (Romansh)

Location
- Country: Switzerland
- Canton: Graubünden, Switzerland

Physical characteristics
- Source
  - location: Confluence of Bergalgabach and Jufer Rhine
  - coordinates: 46°24′3″N 9°32′56″E
  - elevation: 1,931 m (6,335 ft)
- Mouth
  - location: Confluence with Hinterrhein in Andeer
  - coordinates: 46°34′59″N 9°25′20″E
  - elevation: 1,075 m (3,527 ft)
- Length: 20 km (12 mi)
- Basin size: 261 km^{2} (101 sq mi)
- Discharge
  - average: 11.5 m^{3}/s (410 cu ft/s)

Basin features
- Progression: Hinterrhein→ Rhine→ North Sea
- Tributaries
  - left: Bergalgabach, Madrischer Rhein, Reno di Lei, Ual da Niemet
  - right: Jufer Rhine, Ava da Starlera, Ava da Mulegn
- Waterbodies: Innerferrarra reservoir

The Avers Rhine (Romansh: Ragn da Ferrera, German: Averser Rhein) is a tributary of the Hinterrhein/Rein Posteriur in the Swiss canton of Graubünden.

== Course ==
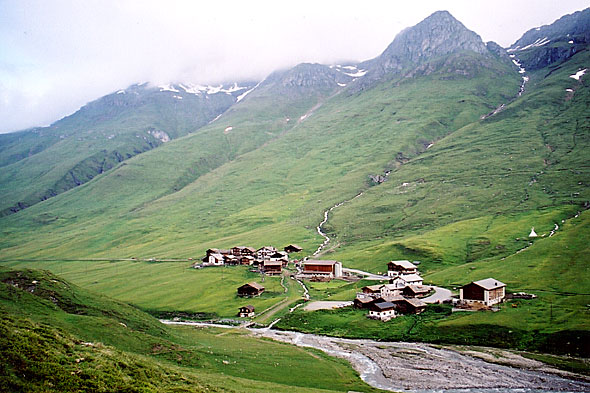
The source of the Jufer Rhine at Juf, the highest situated permanently inhabited settlement in Europe

It rises in Avers at the confluence of the Bergalgabach with the slightly smaller Jufer Rhine. The Jufer Rhine rises in, and is named after, Juf, the highest permanent settlement in Europe, near the border with Albula district. From this confluence, the Avers Rhine descends through a deep gorge, spanned by the 80-metre (260 ft) high Lezi Bridge. When it reaches the valley floor, it meets the slightly smaller Madrish Rhine.

After a few kilometers, it is joined from the left by the Reno di Lei, which flows almost entirely on Italian soil. The Lago di Lei reservoir is also on Italian soil, except for the dam which creates it, which was erected on Swiss territory.

The Avers Rhine continues its way through the Val Ferrera valley, which contains two populated places. The upper village is Innerferrera (Romansh: Calantgil), where the river is dammed, forming the Innerferrera reservoir since 1961. Below Ausserferrera (Romansh: Farera), the glacial valley is flanked by steep rocky slopes. The Avers Rhine then flows into the Hinterrhein in the Rofla Gorge above Andeer.

The road in the Ferrera valley is a cul de sac.

== Tributaries ==
Left tributaries:

- Bergalgabach (largest headwater of the Avers Rhine)
- Madrish Rhine (Romansh: Ägua da Madris)
- Reno di Lei
- Ual da Niemet

Right tributaries:

- Jufer Rhine
- Maleggabach
- Ava da Starlera
- Ava da Mulegn
- Aua Granda

== See also ==
- List of rivers of Switzerland
