= Rhaeto-Romance languages =

Proposed Romance subfamily of northeast Italy and Switzerland

Rhaeto-Romance
- Rhaetian
- Geographic distribution: Italy, Switzerland
- Ethnicity: Friulians, Ladins, Romansh people
- Linguistic classification: Indo-European: Italic; Latino-Faliscan; Latinic; Romance; Italo-Western; Western; Gallo-Iberian?; Gallo-Romance; Gallo-Rhaetian?; Rhaeto-Romance
- Early forms: Old Latin: Vulgar Latin; Proto-Romance; Old Gallo-Romance
- Subdivisions: Friulian; Ladin; Romansh

Language codes
- Glottolog: None
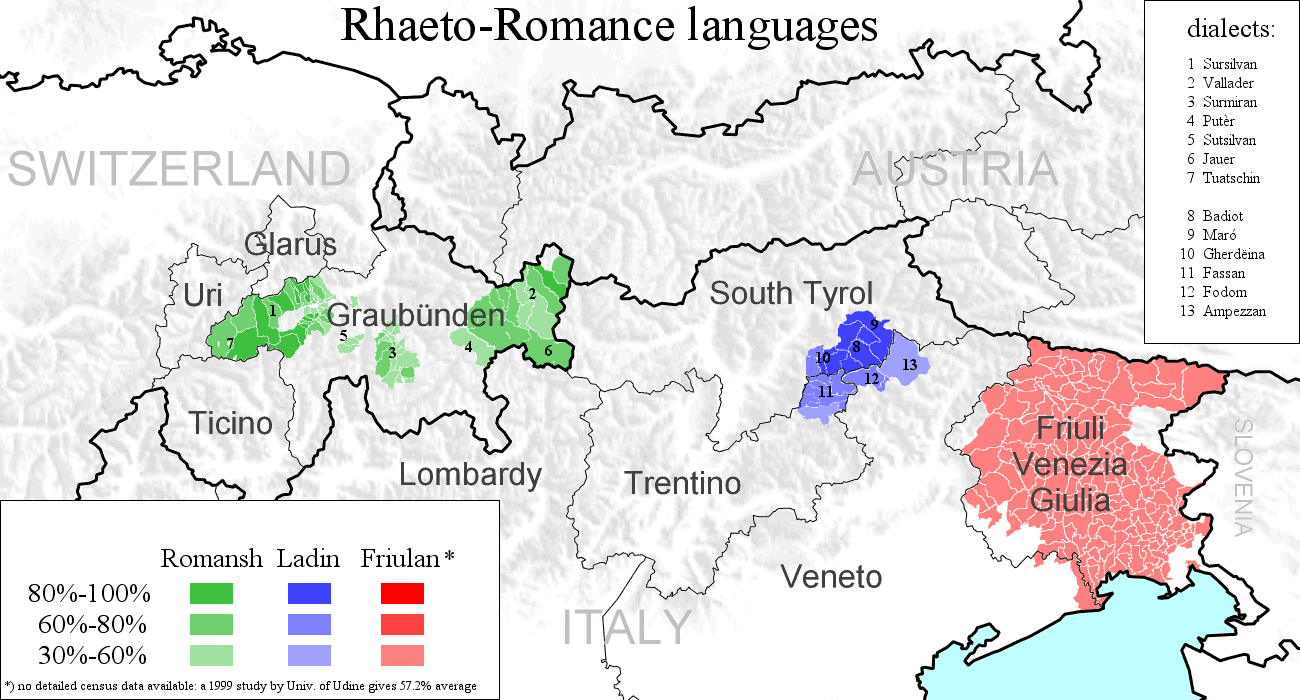
- Distribution areas of the Romansh languages, where the proportion of speakers is at least 30%

Rhaeto-Romance, Rheto-Romance, or Rhaetian, is a purported subfamily of the Romance languages that is spoken in south-eastern Switzerland and north-eastern Italy. The name "Rhaeto-Romance" refers to the former Roman province of Raetia. The question of whether these languages actually form a subfamily is called the Questione Ladina. The Italian linguist Graziadio Ascoli, writing in 1873, found them to share a number of intricacies and believed they formed a linguistic group. The Rhaeto-Romance languages differ from Italian in their evolution from Latin by having passed through a stage with phonemic vowel length, undergone certain consonant developments, and possibly developed a pair of central rounded vowels (now lost everywhere). If the subfamily is genuine, three languages would belong to it: Romansh in Switzerland, and Ladin and Friulian in Italy. Their combined number of speakers is about 660,000; the large majority of these (about 500,000) speak Friulian.

== History of Rhaeto-Romance studies ==
The first reference that somehow connects the Swiss and Italian Rhaeto-Romance dialects is a letter from 1559 by Pier Paolo Vergerio, who simply observes that the language of the Three Leagues (Romansh) is "almost worse than Friulian, itself extremely impoverished", probably alluding to lexical contamination or impoverishment, without implying a real genetic proximity between the systems.

A more advanced position appears in Giusto Fontanini's Della eloquenza italiana (1737), which proposes a genetic relationship between Romansh, Friulian and some Savoyard dialects, traced back to a supposed "original Romance" identified with Vulgar Latin. In 1776 J. von Planta, in An account of the Romansh language, instead supports a closeness between Rhaeto-Romance and the Carolingian language, on a multilingual presentation of the Oath of Strasbourg (842), in the original Gallic Romansh, in twelfth-century French, in Engadine and in a "Romansh of both dialects". He clearly distinguishes the two Swiss varieties as separate languages, and introduces a systematic documentary comparison. Subsequently H. Lehmann (1790) identified the so-called "Romansh of both dialects" with Sursilvan.

Gian Rinaldo Carli, in an essay which appeared in 1788 in the magazine Antologia italiana, connected Friulian and Romansh for the first time, deriving them from old Provençal. This approach is implicitly taken up by C. L. Fernow (1808), who treats them as a novel subgroup based on shared archaic traits. At the same time, the first Ladin lexicographic attempt is attributable to Simone Petro Bartolomei (Catalogus multorum verborum quinque dialectuum, before 1763), in which he collects words of the badiotto, while P. Placi a Spescha, in Die Rhaeto-Hetruskische Sprache (1805) proposes a "Rhaeto-Etruscan" classification, identifying the Sursilvan as the most archaic variety and also hypothesizing a limited mutual intelligibility with Dolomite Ladin.

The collection of 500 translations of the Our Father (started by Adelung and concluded by Vater, 1809) suggests for the first time a connection between the three Rhaeto-Romance areas. L. Diefenbach (1831) identifies a Romansh set (French, Romansh, Friulian, Piedmontese) characterized by Gallo-Romance features, also noting the Germanic syntactic influence on Romansh. J. Haller (1832) connects Ladin and Romansh, comparing the Tyrolean dialects of Badia, Marebbe and Gardena (for which he coins the term "Ladin") with the Swiss dialects Sursilvan dialect and Vallader, on the basis of shared lexical correspondences. Subsequent studies (Mitterrutzner 1856; Schneller 1870) define the Rhaeto-Romance as an autonomous branch of the Romance, although devoid of written unity or internal awareness; Schneller identifies the family's distinctive phonological trait: the palatization of velar stops before /a/.

Graziadio Isaia Ascoli and Theodor Gartner are considered the founders of modern Rhaeto-Romance studies, as they established the classical classification criteria which are still substantially accepted today. In particular, Ascoli in the Saggi Ladini identifies "Ladin" (Rhaeto-Romance) on the basis of a set of shared phonological traits, including: palatalization of velars before /a/, maintenance of /l/ after stops, conservation of final -s, diphthongization of mid-low Latin vowels in closed syllable, diphthongization of Ē/Ī in ei, anteriorization of ū, velarization of /l/ after /a/ in consonantal connection.

These characteristics, however, are neither exclusively Rhaeto-Romance nor uniformly distributed: several are shared with the Gallo-Romance domain, and some are not present in all internal varieties (Friulian for example does not participate in diphthongations).

Despite these cautions, his classification and the diagnostic traits he identified have remained in subsequent tradition, becoming a standard reference framework in the specialist literature.

Gartner, with his Rätoromanische Grammatik (1883), introduces for the first time the term "Rhaeto-Romance" to indicate the linguistic family, and adds to the traits already identified by Ascoli the pronouns ego/tu and the use of the pluperfect subjunctive in unreal conditionals.

Subsequent literature changes this picture little. Von Wartburg (1950; 1956) reports the conservation of the /j/ ~ /g/ palatalized distinction in some varieties of Romansh (Bravuogn, Müstair), a trait shared with Sardinian but also with adjacent North Italian dialects (Val Bregaglia, Livigno) and absent in other Ladin areas (Moena, Gardena), weakening its diagnostic value for the purposes of Rhaeto-Romance unity. Kuen (1968) adds the conservation of the opposition indicative/imperative in the 2nd plural, lost in French and Italian.

Rohlfs (1975) essentially repeats the traditional list without significantly expanding it. Further attempts prove problematic: the proposed features are often not pan-Rhaeto-Romance or shared with other Romance varieties. For example, the anteriorization of /uː/ is shared by Romansh and some Ladin dialects, but not by Friulian, and is also shared by Piedmontese and Lombard.

This raises the question, already posed by Schneller (1870), of whether the diagnostic features are truly exclusive. Carlo Battisti (in "Popoli e lingue nell'Alto Adige", 1931) responds negatively, interpreting Ladin and related dialects as peripheral High Italian varieties. He recognizes the palatalization of velars before /a/ as the only relatively distinctive feature, but considers it an independent innovation that appeared at different times in the three areas, not evidence of genetic unity. The structural relationships within Rhaeto-Romance are less strong than those between Romansh and Lombard, Ladin and Trentino, and Friulian and Venetian, the latter being more archaic and pervasive.

Subsequent attempts fail to resolve the problem: Leonard (1972) postulates a Proto-Rhaeto-Romance distinct from Vulgar Latin, assuming rather than demonstrating the unity of Rhaeto-Romance; Redfern (1971), based on lexical analysis, suggests unity but highlights strong heterogeneity. Pellegrini (1972a, 1987a) reaffirms the continuity with the High Italian dialects, especially lexically.

== Origin ==
Before the Roman conquest, the Alps were Celtic-speaking in the north and Rhaetian-speaking in the south. The area was incorporated into the Roman Empire during the reign of Augustus. The Rhaeto-Romance languages originated as a dialect of the provincial Latin of the central Alps.

By the end of the Roman Empire, there was an unbroken region of distinctive Romance speech here, which was gradually fragmented into secluded areas in the high valleys by the encroachment of German dialects from the north and of Gallo-Italic languages from the south.

Rhaeto-Romance was spoken over a much wider area during Charlemagne's rule, stretching north into the present-day cantons of Glarus and St. Gallen, Walensee in the northwest, and Rüthi and the Alpine Rhine Valley in the northeast. In the east, parts of modern-day Vorarlberg were Romance speaking, as were parts of Austrian Tyrol. The northern areas of what is currently Switzerland, called "Lower Raetia" at that time, became German-speaking by the 12th century; and by the 15th century, the Rhine Valley of St. Gallen and the areas around the Walensee were entirely German-speaking.

This language shift was a long, drawn-out process, with larger, central towns adopting German first, while the more peripheral areas around them remained Romansh-speaking longer. The shift to German was caused in particular by the influence of the local German-speaking elites and by German-speaking immigrants from the north, with the lower and rural classes retaining Romansh longer.

== Related languages ==
The family is most closely related to its nearest neighbors: French, Franco-Provençal, Occitan, Venetian, Istriot and Lombard.

A number of lexical items are shared with Ibero-Romance due to the similar date of Latinization for both regions, although it can also be explained by means of Bartoli's areal linguistics theory, Ibero-Romance being a peripheral area, as are Balkano-Romance, Southern-Italian and Rhaeto-Romance, whereas Gallo-Romance and Italo-Romance are the central area. The Rhaeto-Romance languages were linked to other Romance languages that existed in bordering areas but have later disappeared, like the Moselle Romance and the Austrian Romance.

== History and classification ==
While the areas that now speak Friulian were originally inhabited by speakers of Venetic (likely Italic) and Celtic languages, the areas of Northeastern Italy that now speak Ladin initially spoke a non-Indo-European language called Raetic. Ladin and Romansh originate from the Vulgar Latin spoken by Roman soldiers during the conquests of Raetia.

=== Romansh ===
By the mid-9th century, Romansh was spoken over a far wider area. However, with the migration of many elite German land owners, Romansh dissipated across Northern Italy. The oldest literary text in the Romansh language is the Chianzun dalla guerra dagl Chiaste da Müs, which details the Musso War.

By 1803, the state of Grisons, which was 50.14% Romansh, 36.20% German and 13.66% Italian-speaking, became a part of Switzerland. The strength of the central government of Grisons, whose official language was German, began to impose on the Romansh-speaking people, which resulted in many Romansh speakers adopting German. With the 20th century came a rise in tourism, which took the focus away from the region's agricultural focus and resulted in German becoming the more practical language to learn. Many in the intellectual class found this to be beneficial to the local population as Romansh appeared to hinder their intellectual development. As Heinrich Bansi, a notable priest in 1897, noted: The biggest obstacle to the moral and economical improvement of these regions is the language of the people. This viewpoint was countered with the belief that the Romansh language was a hybrid of both Italian and German, allowing the Romansh speakers to have a moderate understanding of the other two more widely used languages.

By the mid-19th century, amidst a dwindling Romansh-speaking population, a renaissance of sorts appeared. This culminated in the 1885 creation of an association of all Romansh regions known as Società Retorumantscha. In 1919, the Lia Rumantscha was created to encompass all of the regional Romansh-speaking societies. In addition, more schools began to teach Romansh by the mid-19th century. In 1860, Romansh became a subject in a teachers' college and an officially recognized language in 1880.

Despite these efforts, with more and more of the surrounding area speaking German, the Lia Rumantscha created Romansh-speaking daycare schools in the 1940s. Unfortunately, this effort failed to deliver, and the last school was closed by 1979.

=== Friulian ===
Friulian traces its roots back to the Latin Aquileia. Prior to Roman contact in 181 BC the region of northeastern Italy was of Raetian, Italic and Celtic origins and used a form of either Raetian, Venetic or Celtic. The transition from Vulgar Latin to Friulian occurred in the 6th century AD. The first official use of Friulian can be traced back to the 13th century and by the 15th century a majority of the population spoke the language, while the noble classes continued to use Latin or German. In 1420, the area of Friuli transitioned under Venetian rule, and the Venetian dialect became the dominant language. As the influence of Venetian and Italian increased over the years, the Friulian language waned. Accelerating this decline currently is the ongoing loss of Friulian language teaching in higher education.

An exception to this decline occurred in the mid 20th century when a devastating earthquake struck the local region. In the aftermath, many found solace in sharing their local Friulian language, thus renewing interest in it. The imprint of the language also remains on the local geography as many of the local towns and geographical landmarks (mountains, woods, animals, plants) were given Celtic names which survive to this day.

=== Ladin ===
Ladin was initially a vulgar Latin language from the Alps of northern Italy. Beginning in the 6th century, the Ladin language began to shrink due to the encroachment of Bavarian and Gallo-Italic languages, surviving in only the isolated mountainous areas. In the early Middle Ages, the Ladin region came under House of Habsburg and Republic of Venice rule. From these two influences, the Ladin area underwent the process of Germanisation.

By the end of World War I Italy had annexed the region that encompassed the Ladin language. With the nationalism of the 20th century, Ladin was considered by many Italians to be an Italian dialect. Benito Mussolini later pushed forward an Italianization of the region which further dwindled the Ladin language user base. Despite the small number of Ladin speakers, in 1972 the Italian government afforded Ladin the status of a secondary language.

== Geographic distribution ==
=== Romansh ===
Spoken in the Swiss canton of Graubünden by 60,561 people – 0.83% of the Swiss population.

=== Friulian ===
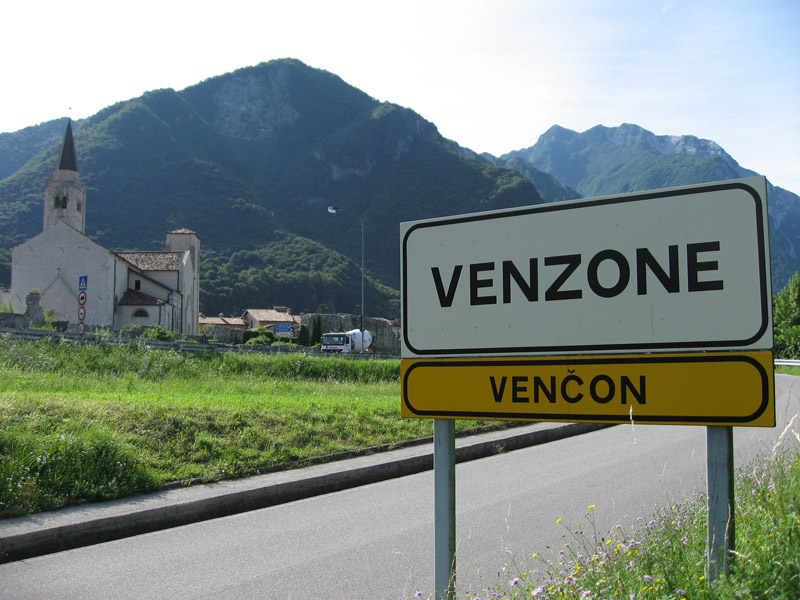
Bilingual road sign (Italian and Friulian) in Friuli-Venezia Giulia

Spoken in Italy, most notably the provinces of Udine and Pordenone, by about 600,000 people.

=== Ladin ===
Spoken in northeastern Italy, in Trentino-Alto Adige and the Province of Belluno in Veneto, by about 41,000 people.

=== Official status ===
==== Romansh ====
The first Swiss constitution of 1848 along with its revision of 1872 neglected to mention the Romansh language; however, it was translated into two Romansh dialects after the first revision. In 1938 Romansh became a national language, though a delineation was made between "national" and "official" languages. National languages were largely symbolic while official languages (French, German, and Italian) were used in an official capacity by the government. One notable disadvantage of being a national, rather than official language was that parents would have to register their children's names under one of the official languages.

By 1996 Romansh was recognized as an official language beside French, German and Italian, and Rhaeto-Romansh is now the official correspondence used when communicating with Romansh people.

At this time the Canton of Grison is the only place where Romansh is the official language. This allows for any citizen to request official documents from the local government in the Romansh language.

==== Friulian ====
An official language of the autonomous region of Friuli, it has protected status, and is used in all forms of education in the region. Still used at popular levels for daily conversation.

==== Ladin ====
Ladin is recognized by both provincial and national law in Italy. In the early 1990s Italy signed European Charter for Regional or Minority Languages which is meant to protect and promote minority languages such as Ladin.

=== Dialects ===
==== Romansh ====
- Sursilvan
- Putèr
- Vallader
- Surmiran
- Sutsilvan

==== Friulian ====
- Central Friulian, spoken in the Udine province.
- Northern Friulian, spoken in Carnia.
- Southeastern Friulian, spoken in areas along the Isonzo river.
- Western Friulian, spoken in the Pordenone province.

==== Ladin ====
- Athesian group of the Sella, spoken in South Tyrol.
- Trentinian group of the Sella, spoken in the Fassa Valley.
- Agordino group of the Sella, spoken most prominently Livinallongo del Col di Lana and Colle Santa Lucia.
- Ampezzan group, spoken in Cortina d'Ampezzo.
- Cadorino group, spoken in Cadore and Comelico.
- Nones and Solando group, spoken in In Western Trentino, in Non Valley, Val di Sole, Val di Peio, Val di Rabbi, and Val Rendena.

== Varieties ==
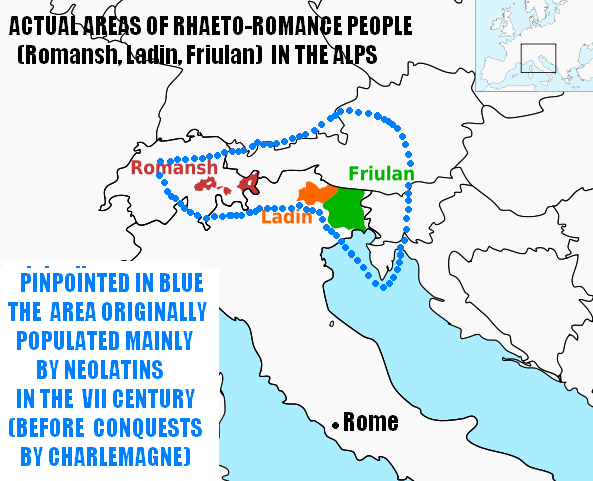
Contraction of the area of the Rhaeto-Romance languages

The area where Rhaeto-Romance languages (also called Ladin languages in a wider sense, not to be confused with Ladino or Judaeo-Spanish) were spoken during the Middle Ages stretched from Switzerland to the Julian Alps (in modern-day western Slovenia).

The Rhaeto-Romance languages can be distinguished into the following varieties:

- Romansh: Switzerland. In Switzerland, Romansh is one of country's four national languages; however, its usage is rather limited to the canton of Graubünden (Romansh: Grischun). It is composed of the following dialects:
  - Puter (Engadin valley)
  - Vallader (Engadin valley)
  - Surmiran
  - Sursilvan
  - Sutsilvan
  - Rumantsch Grischun, the standardized literary language, constructed by the Swiss linguist Heinrich Schmid in 1982.
- Ladin:
  - Dolomitic Ladin in Italy (in Trentino, South Tyrol and the province of Belluno)
- Friulian: Friuli region, Italy

A phylogenetic classification using basic lexicon identifies a primary split between Romansh in Switzerland and Ladin in Italy. One secondary split distinguishes Engadinic from the other Romansh varieties in Switzerland. In Italy, another secondary split is evidently caused by the Dolomite mountain range that divides Ladin into a northern and a southern subbranch, with Friulian being grouped closest to the southern branch.

In this study, the divergence of the Rhaeto-Romance languages from their reconstructed lexical ancestor is about 7% on average. This would correspond to a time depth of about 500 years if the glottochronological replacement rate of 14% per millennium for Romance were trustworthy. However, the earliest available Romance text from the Alpine area is somewhat older and dates to AD 1200.

== Phonology ==
=== Romansh ===
The Romansh language has up to 26 consonant phonemes. Word stress occurs either on the last or second to last syllable.

== Grammar ==
=== Morphology ===
==== Romansh ====
In Romansh word order directs the grammar rather than the noun being inflected. Additionally, similar to most other Romance languages there are two genders in addition to s being used to indicate a plural word.

==== Friulian ====
Similar to Italian and Spanish, most Friulian nouns end in a vowel based on the gender, with feminine nouns ending in e while masculine nouns end in i.

=== Syntax ===
The general word order is subject-verb-object, however this can change at times where the verb can come before the subject.

== Vocabulary ==
=== Romansh ===
Many place names in Romansh date back before Roman contact stemming from Raetic and Celtic origins.

=== Friulian ===
Most words in Friulian are of the Romance variety due to its Latin roots; however, it still has many place names and flora that trace back to Raetic, Venetic and Celtic origins.

== See also ==
- Rhaetian language, an unrelated language spoken in ancient times around the area where Rhaeto-Romance is now spoken.
- Western Romance languages
