= Schams =

Valley in Swiss canton of Graubünden

Coordinates: 46.612°N 9.426°E

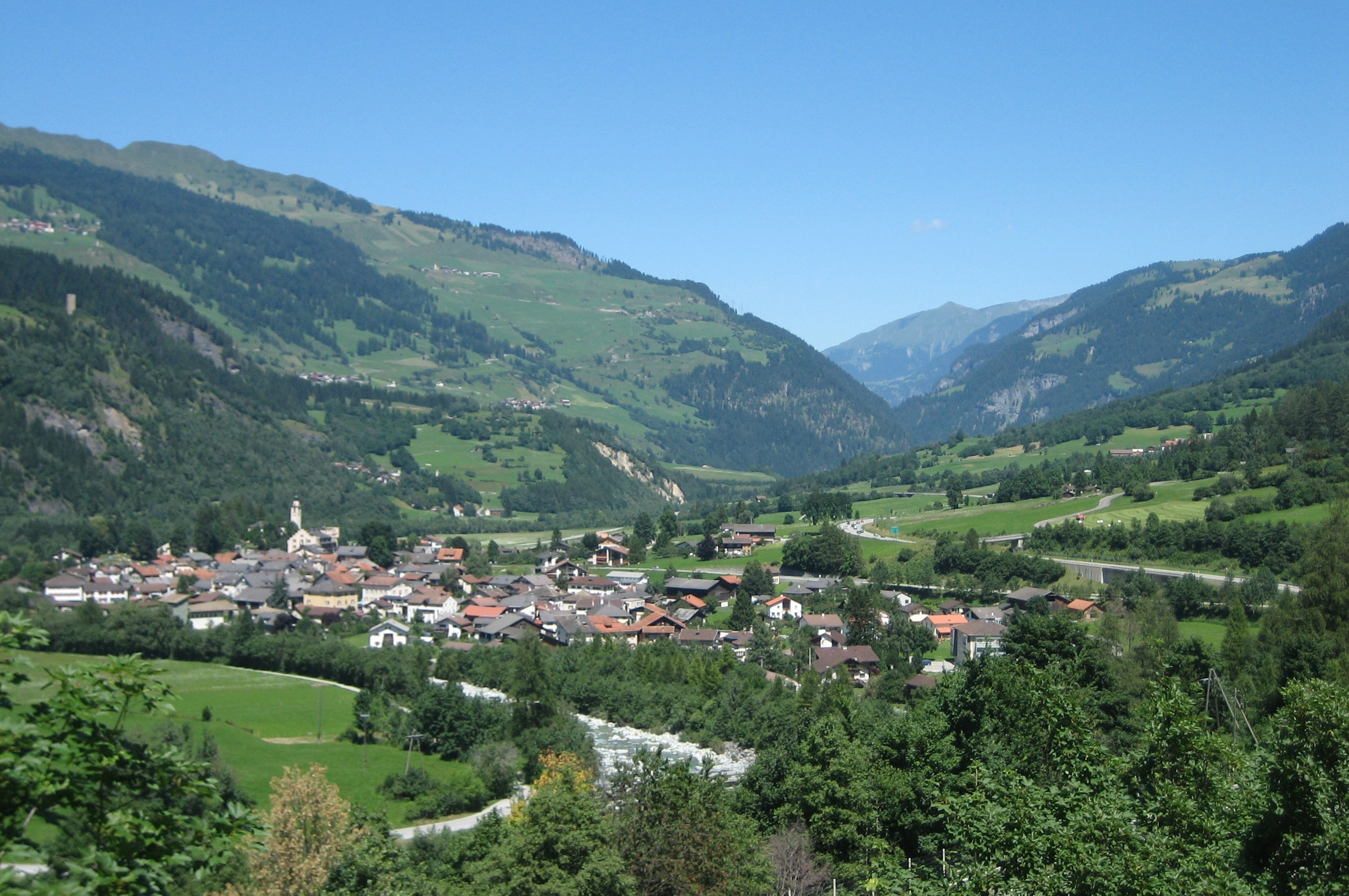
The Schams north of Andeer. In the top left, the ruins of Cagliatscha Castle

The Schams (Romansh: (Val) Schons) is a section of the Hinterrhein valley in the Swiss canton of Graubünden.

== Geography ==
Schams in Graubünden

The Schams is the central of the three valleys along the Hinterrhein. It is separated from the Rheinwald valley upstreams by the Rofla Gorge, and downstreams by the Viamala gorge from the Domleschg/Heinzenberg valley. The Posterior Rhine flows through the valley in a predominantly south-to-north direction and falls from a height of 1094 m at the outflow of Rofla Gorge, where the Val Ferrera flows in from the right, to 883 m at the Raniabrücke.

The Schams valley is bordered on both sides by mountain ranges of around 3000 m high. The highest peaks on the Western side are the Pizzas d'Anarosa (3000 m), the Bruschghorn (3056 m) and the prominent Piz Beverin (2998 m). On the eastern side, the highest peak is Piz Curvér (2972 m) on the border with Oberhalbstein.

The larger settlements are close to the river. The left slope, locally known as the Schamserberg (English: Mount Schams; Romansh: Muntogna da Schons), which rises relatively uniformly to Piz Beverin rising left-side slope, is used for agricultural purposes op to 2200 m. Around the villages, there is a zone with Maiensässes; higher up the slope is a zone with Alpine meadows. On the right side slope, where the forests rech down to the valley floor, there are no settlements other than Maiensässes.

== Municipalities ==
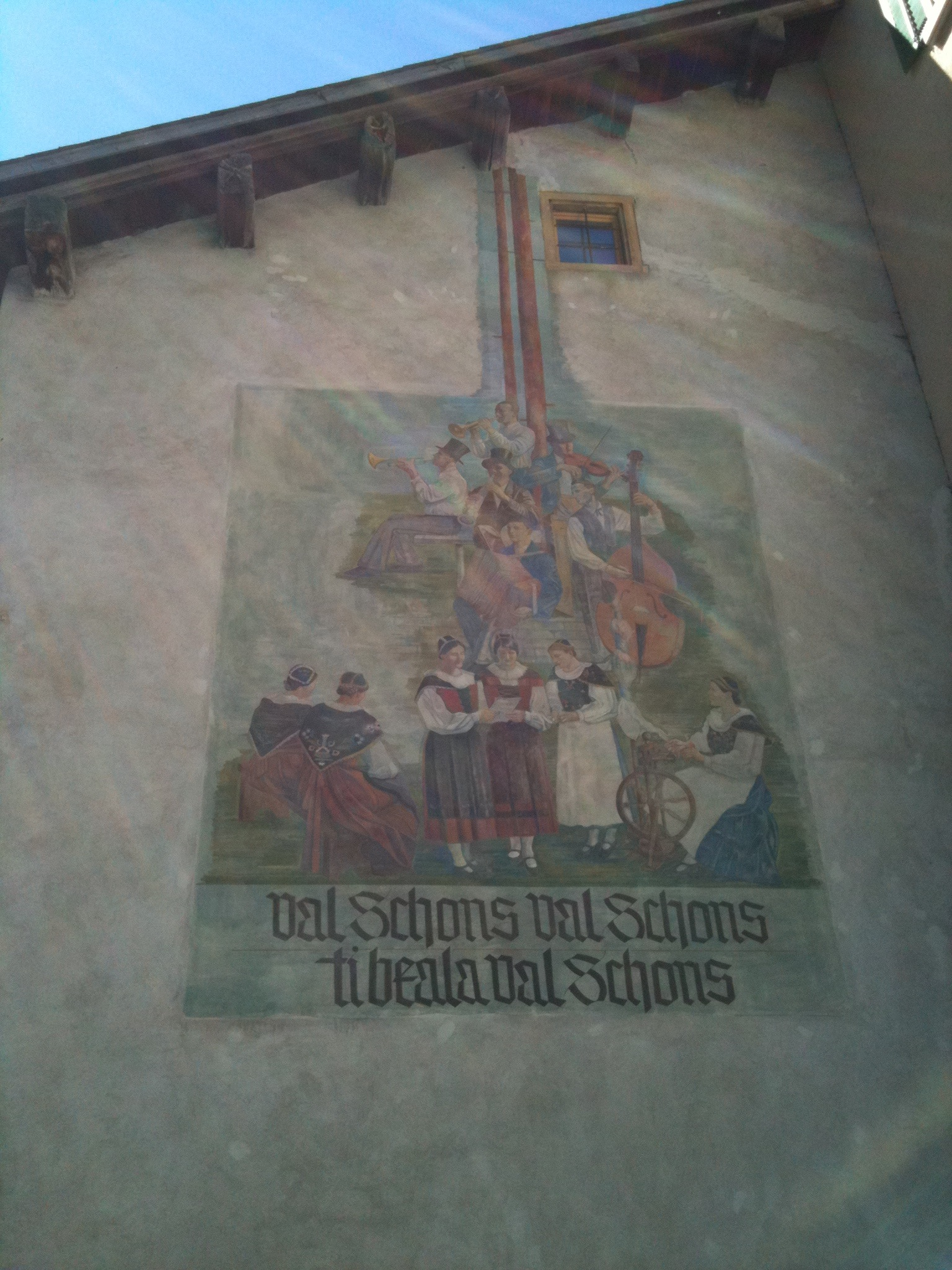
Wall-paintings and inscriptions in Andeer, written in Sutsilvan, about the beautiful valley of Val Schons

In the valley floor of the Rhine, on the right bank are the larger villages Andeer and Zillis (including the village Reischen) and Pignia, and on the left bank Clugin and Donat, all at elevations of 940–1020 m. On Schamserberg we find on the lower level (1100 to 1200 m), the village in the municipality of Casti-Wergenstein and the villages Pazen and Farden in the municipality of Donat. Higher up the Schamserberg, at around 1500 m altitude, with a better view of the surrounding mountain, are Lohn, Mathon and Wergenstein.

There are a total of eight municipalities in Schams sub-district. They include, in addition to those mentioned above, Ferrera in the Val Ferrera, and Rongellen at the northern end of the Viamala gorge.

The Jurisdiction of Schams, a member of the Grey League, joined the Reformation in its entirety. Until the mid-20th century, the Sutsilvan dialect of Romansh was almost the only language spoken in the valley. This changed dramatically in the late 20th century, especially in accessible places, such as Zillis and Andeer and the Val Ferrera. There, the proportion of predominantly German-speaking people was already above 80% in the 2000 census. On the Schamserberg, Romansh still had a narrow majority.

== Transport ==
Since Roman times, the transit route of the "Lower Road" leads from Chur via the Schams valley to Splügen Pass and San Bernardino Pass. Today the highway A13 follows this route. The mountain passes into Oberhalbstein, the Pass da Surcarungas, Spunda Surses and Pass da Schmorras, were never very significant.

Access by public transport is provided by the fast bus from Chur to Bellinzona (which stops in Zillis and Andeer). Local transport is provided by a bus to the Schamserberg and one into Avers.
