= Splügen =

- Former municipality
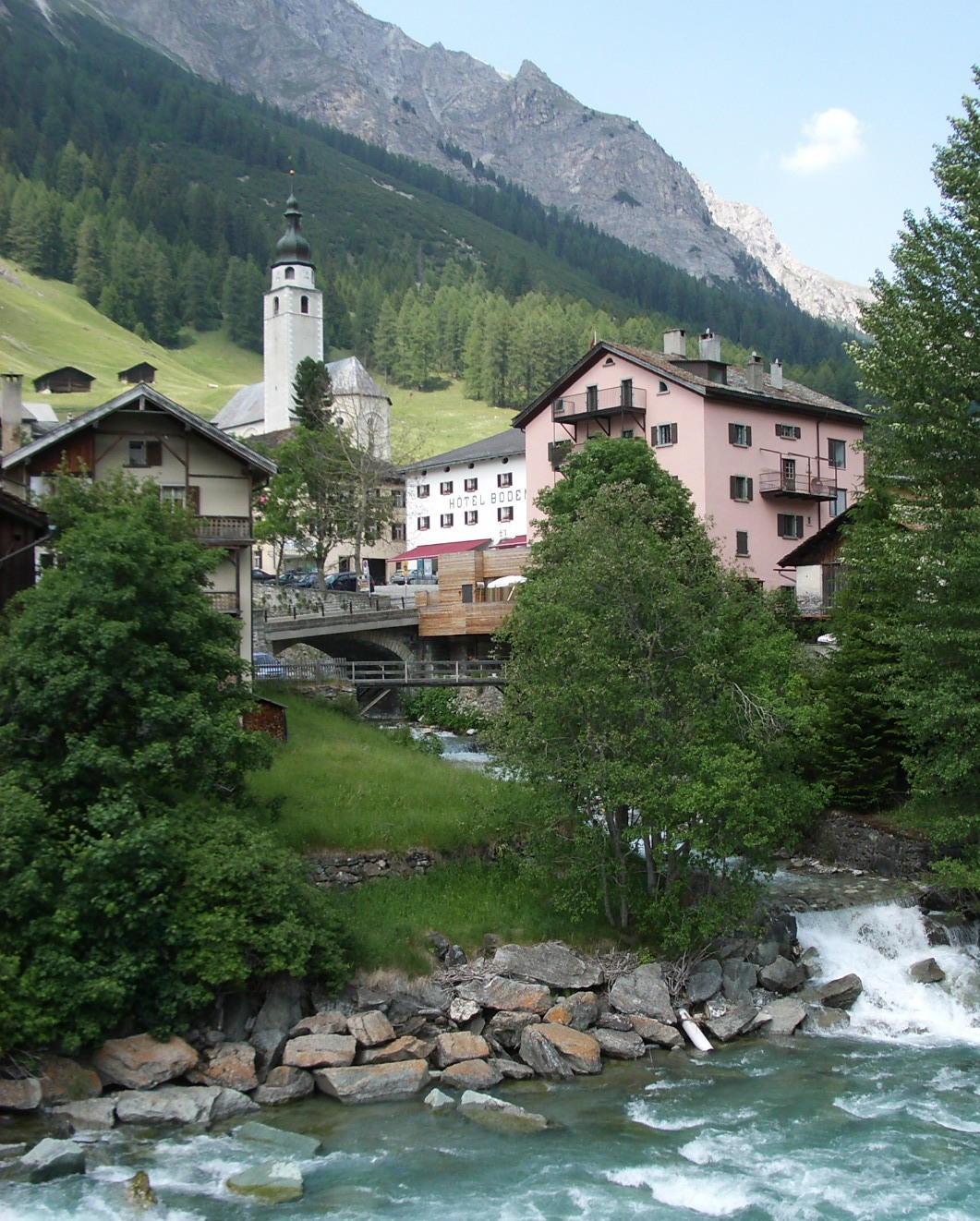

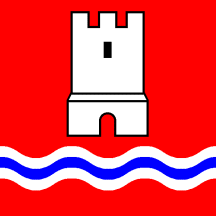
- Flag Coat of arms
- Location of Splügen
- Location within Switzerland Location within Canton of Graubünden
- Coordinates: 46°33′N 9°19′E
- Country: Switzerland
- Canton: Graubünden
- District: Viamala

Government
  - Mayor: Walter Mengelt

Area
  - Total: 60.49 km^{2} (23.36 sq mi)
- Elevation: 1,475 m (4,839 ft)

Population (December 2020)
  - Total: 377
  - Density: 6.23/km^{2} (16.1/sq mi)
- Time zone: UTC+01:00 (CET)
  - Summer (DST): UTC+02:00 (CEST)
- Postal code: 7435
- SFOS number: 3694
- ISO 3166 code: CH-GR
- Localities: Medels im Rheinwald
- Surrounded by: Madesimo (IT-SO), Mesocco, Nufenen, Safien, Sufers
- Website: www.gemeinde-spluegen.ch

Splügen (Romansh: Spleia, Italian: Spluga) is a former municipality in the Viamala Region in the Swiss canton of Graubünden. On 1 January 2006 Splügen incorporated its neighbouring municipality of Medels im Rheinwald. On 1 January 2019 the former municipalities of Hinterrhein, Nufenen and Splügen merged to form the new municipality of Rheinwald.

In 1995, the Swiss Heritage Society bestowed the Wakker Prize to Splügen.

== History ==
Splügen is first mentioned about 840 as cella in Speluca.

== Geography ==
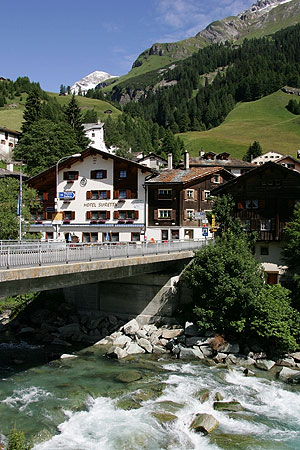
Splügen

Splügen has an area, as of 2006, of 60.5 km^{2} (23.4 sq mi). Of this area, 38.3% is used for agricultural purposes, while 17.8% is forested. Of the rest of the land, 1% is settled (buildings or roads) and the remainder (42.9%) is non-productive (rivers, glaciers or mountains).

Before 2017, the municipality was located in the Rheinwald sub-district, of the Hinterrhein district, after 2017 it was part of the Viamala Region. It consists of the village of Splügen and since 1 January 2006, Medels im Rheinwald. It is a haufendorf (an irregular, unplanned and quite closely packed village, built around a central square) located on a ridge between the Splügen pass and San Bernardino pass.

The Splügen Pass road leads from Splügen to Chiavenna and rises to a height of 2,020 meters (6,630 ft). The Italian name for the pass is Passo dello Spluga. The pass is closed in winter nowadays and the whole route hosts a number of historically interesting spots that can be reached on a common multiday hike between Thusis and Chiavenna, passing the two gorges Roflaschlucht and Viamala north of Splügen.

== Demographics ==
Splügen has a population (as of 31 December 2020) of 377. As of 2008, 10.7% of the population was made up of foreign nationals. Over the last 10 years the population has decreased at a rate of -8.3%.

As of 2000, the gender distribution of the population was 50.0% male and 50.0% female. The age distribution, as of 2000, in Splügen is; 25 people or 13.2% of the population are between 0 and 9 years old. 22 people or 11.6% are 10 to 14, and 3 people or 1.6% are 15 to 19. Of the adult population, 8 people or 4.2% of the population are between 20 and 29 years old. 35 people or 18.5% are 30 to 39, 20 people or 10.6% are 40 to 49, and 15 people or 7.9% are 50 to 59. The senior population distribution is 28 people or 14.8% of the population are between 60 and 69 years old, 21 people or 11.1% are 70 to 79, there are 11 people or 5.8% who are 80 to 89, and there are 1 people or 0.5% who are 90 to 99.

In the 2007 federal election the most popular party was the SVP which received 47.6% of the vote. The next three most popular parties were the FDP (23.4%), the SPS (22.6%) and the CVP (6.2%).

In Splügen about 67.6% of the population (between age 25-64) have completed either non-mandatory upper secondary education or additional higher education (either university or a Fachhochschule).

Splügen has an unemployment rate of 0.33%. As of 2005, there were 39 people employed in the primary economic sector and about 16 businesses involved in this sector. 27 people are employed in the secondary sector and there are 6 businesses in this sector. 150 people are employed in the tertiary sector, with 30 businesses in this sector.

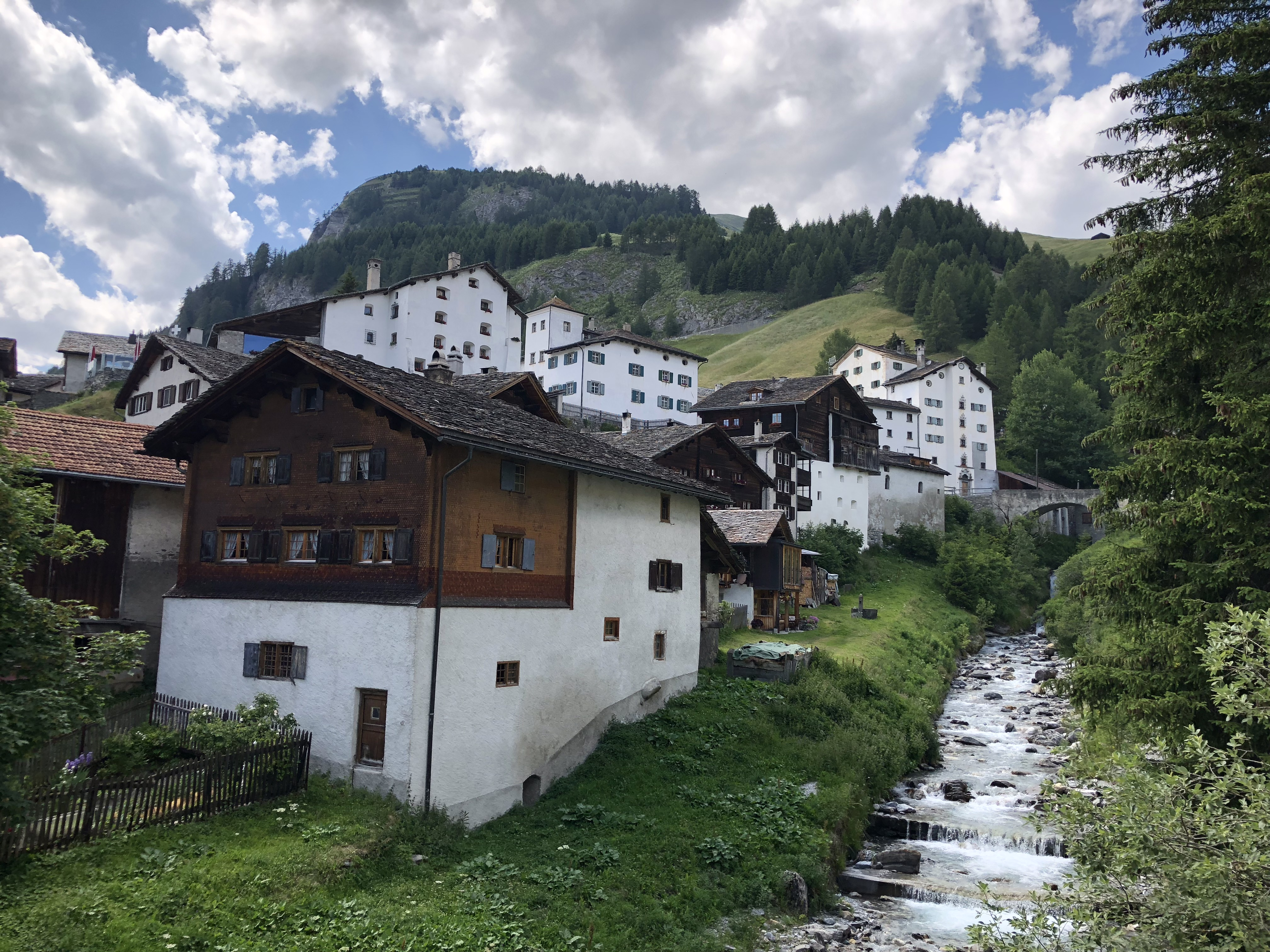
Splügen

The historical population is given in the following table:

| year | population |
|---|---|
| 1690 | 360 |
| 1850 | 494 |
| 1900 | 373 |
| 1930 | 336 |
| 1950 | 387 |
| 2000 | 365 |

== Languages ==
Most of the population (as of 2000) speaks German (89.8%), with Italian being second most common (2.7%) and Portuguese being third (2.4%).

Languages in Splügen
| Languages | Census 1980 | | Census 1990 | | Census 2000 | |
| Languages | Number | Percent | Number | Percent | Number | Percent |
|---|---|---|---|---|---|---|
| German | 350 | 84.34% | 364 | 87.71% | 369 | 89.78% |
| Romansh | 30 | 7.23% | 18 | 4.34% | 8 | 1.95% |
| Italian | 20 | 4.82% | 9 | 2.17% | 11 | 2.68% |
| Population | 415 | 100% | 415 | 100% | 411 | 100% |

== Tourism ==
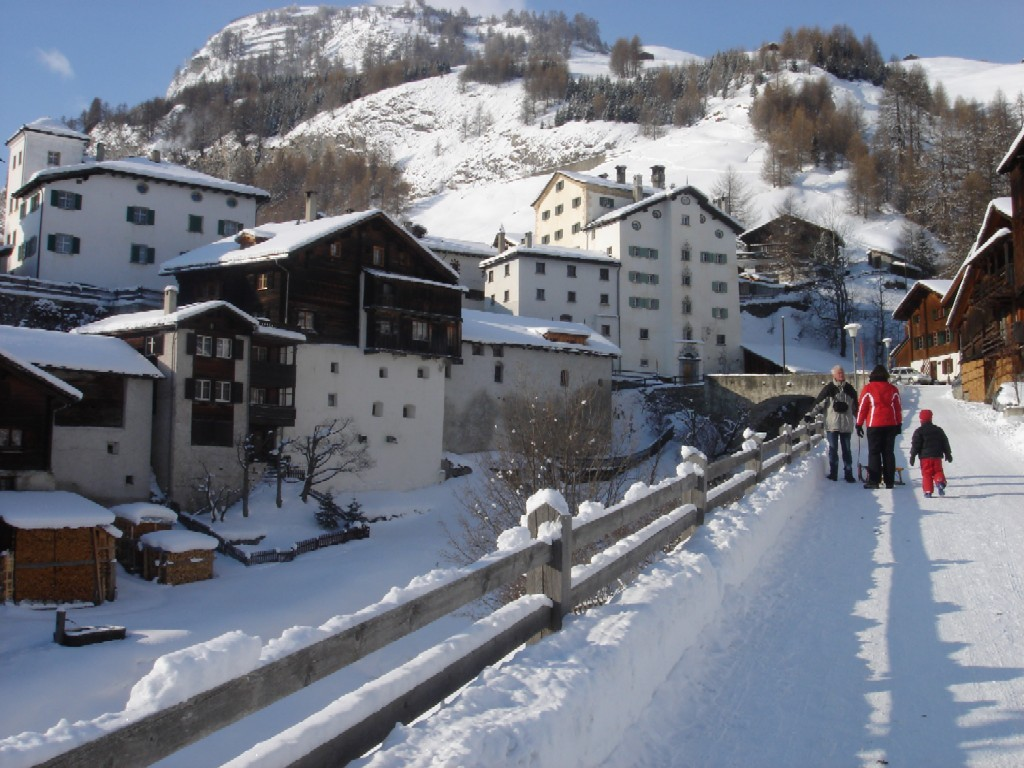
Splügen in winter

=== Skiing ===
Splügen, in the winter, is a ski resort with a lift going in the direction of the Splügen Pass.

=== Heritage sites of national significance ===
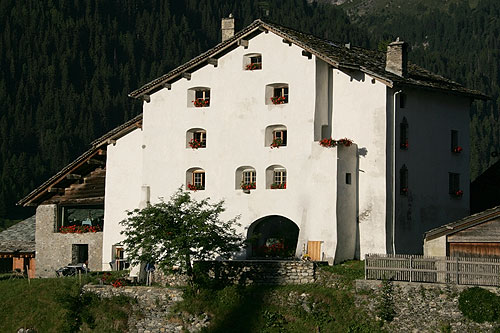
Hotel Weiss Kreuz

The former Säumerherberge (mule drivers hostel) Weiss Kreuz is listed as a Swiss heritage sites of national significance.

=== Wakker Prize ===
In 1995, the Swiss Heritage Society bestowed the Wakker Prize to Splügen. The prize description notes that Splügen had reached a notable compromise between preservation and tourism. The old town was strictly protected to maintain the original appearance, while rational zone planning allowed development to occur outside the old village.
