= Sursilvan =

Western variety of the Romansh language

- sursilvan
- Pronunciation: [sursilˈvaːn]
- Native to: Surselva in Switzerland
- Language family: Indo-European: Italic; Latino-Faliscan; Romance; Italo-Western; Western Romance; Gallo-Romance; Rhaeto-Romance or Gallo-Rhaetian; Romansh; Sursilvan
- Writing system: Latin script

Language codes
- ISO 639-3: –
- Glottolog: surs1244
- Linguasphere: 51-AAA-ka
- IETF: rm-sursilv

Sursilvan (pronounced [sursilˈvaːn]; also romontsch sursilvan [roˈmɔntʃ sursilˈvaːn]; Sursilvan, Vallader, Surmiran, Sutsilvan, and Rumantsch Grischun: sursilvan; Puter: sursilvaun) is a group of dialects of the Romansh language spoken in the Swiss district of Surselva. It is the most widely spoken variety of Romansh with 17,897 people within the Surselva District (54.8%) naming Romansh as a habitually spoken language in the Swiss census of 2000. The most closely related variety is Sutsilvan, which is spoken in the area located to the east of the district.

The name of the dialect and the Surselva District is derived from sur 'above' and selva 'forest', with the forest in question being the Uaul Grond in the area affected by the Flims Rockslide. The word selva itself has fallen out of use in modern Sursilvan, with the most common word for forest being uaul, an Old High German loanword. Selva is only used for in a few more recent terms such as selvicultura 'forestry', selvicultur 'forest officer', or cavrer selvadi 'Long-eared owl'.

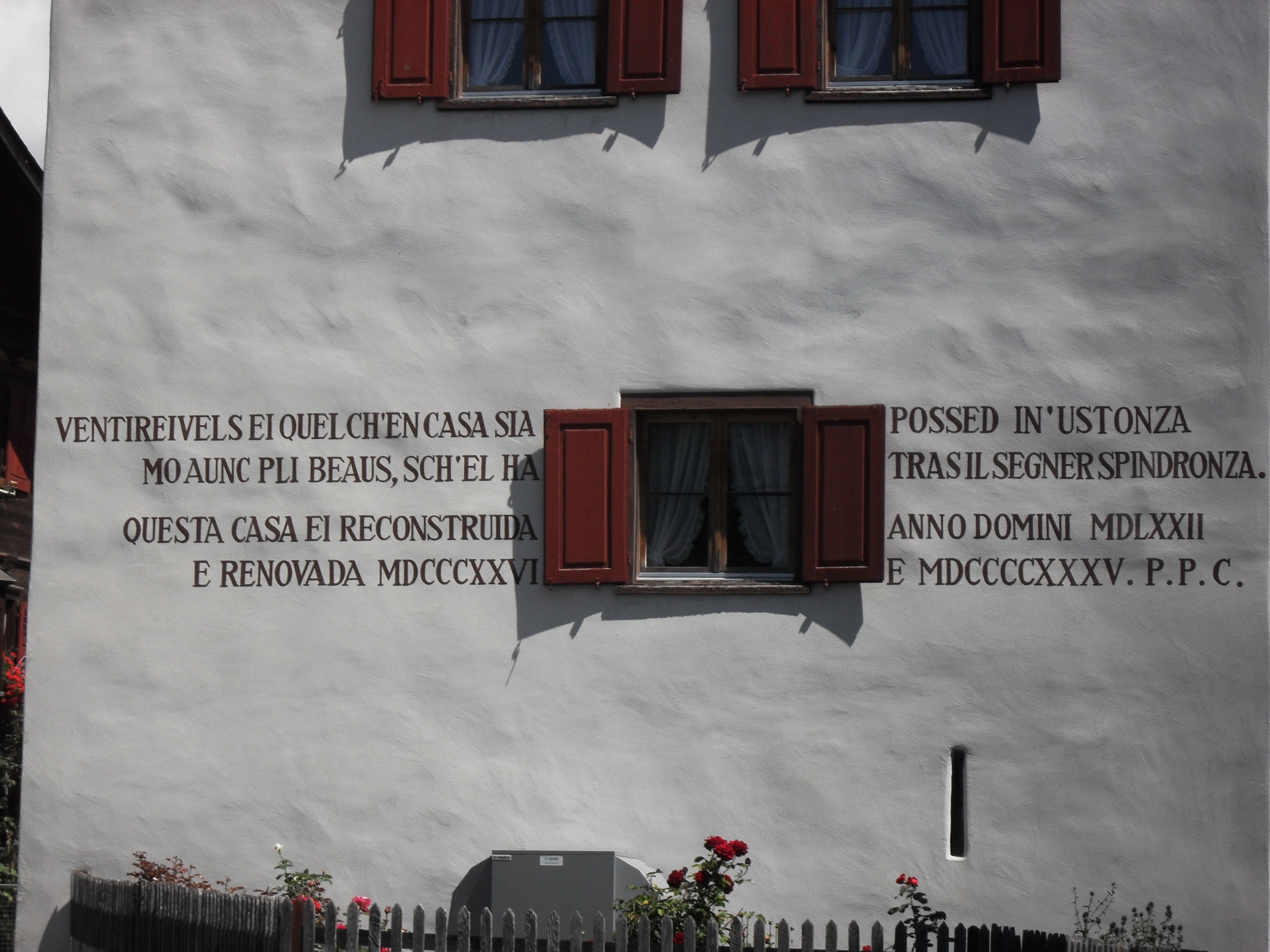
A Sursilvan inscription on a house in Waltensburg/Vuorz

== Distribution ==
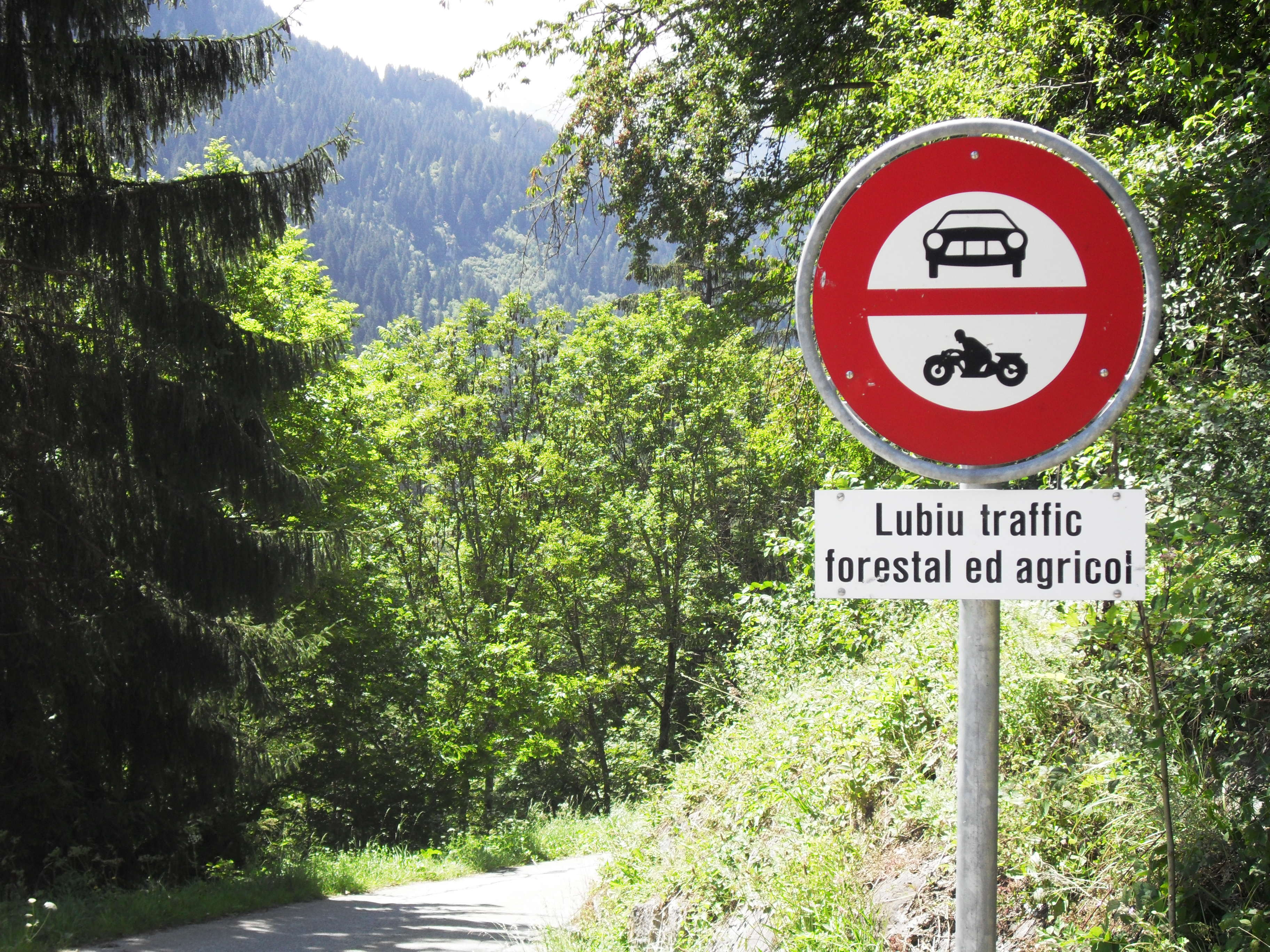
A Sursilvan traffic sign

Sursilvan is used across most of the Surselva District, with the exception of the Walser villages of Obersaxen, Vals, St. Martin and Safiental. Outside of the Surselva District, Flims is also part of the Sursilvan dialect area. In addition, Sursilvan was previously used as the written Romansh language of parts of the Sutsilvan dialect area. When a separate Sutsilvan written language was introduced in 1944, the villages of Bonaduz, Rhäzüns, Domat/Ems and Trin retained Sursilvan as their written language. In addition, Sursilvan was previously used in the Surmiran dialect area as the language of church, but has now been replaced by Standard Surmiran and Rumantsch Grischun.

Most municipalities in which Sursilvan is the traditional language still have a Romansh-speaking majority today. The exceptions are Flims, Laax, Schnaus, Ilanz, Castrisch, Surcuolm, and Duvin. In all of these, except for Flims, however, a majority of people reported using Romansh daily in the 2000 Swiss census, even if only a minority named it as their language of best command. In about half of the Sursilvan villages, Romansh is the language of best command of over 70% or 80%. The highest percentage is found in Vrin with over 95%. As a daily language, it is used in nearly all municipalities by at least 70%, in about half by more than 80%, and in a third by over 90%. Overall across the Sursilvan dialect area, in the census of 2000, 70.1% named Romansh as a habitually used language, while 58.3% named it as their language of best command.

== Orthography ==
Sursilvan spelling mostly follows a phonemic system.

Orthography	IPA	Example
а	/a/	clav ‘key‘
аi	/aɪ̯/	zai ‘tough‘
аu	/aʊ̯/	paun ‘bread‘
b	/b/	bogn ‘bath‘
c	/k/ before a, o, u /ts/ before i and e	canzun ‘song‘ december ‘December‘
ch	/k/ (only occurs before i and e)	zucher ‘sugar‘
d	/d/	dadens ‘inside‘
e	/e/ /ɛ/	tegia ‘hut‘ lev ‘light‘
è	/ɛ/	pèr ‘pair‘
é	/e/	pér ‘pear‘
ei	depending on the region, /ɛɪ̯/ (Gruob), /aɪ̯/ (Cadi) or /ɔɪ̯/ (Breil/Brigels)	treis ‘three‘
eu	/ɛʊ̯/	glieud ‘people‘
f	/f/	fil ‘thread‘
g	/g/ before a, o, u /dʑ/ before i and e (i is silent)	grischun ‘Grisons‘ baselgia ‘church‘
gh	/g/ (only occurs before i and e)	schenghegiar ‘give a gift‘
gl	/ʎ/ at the end of a word and before i (i is silent) /gl/ before a, e, o, u and some loanwords	egl ‘eye‘ Glaruna ‘Glarus‘
gn	/ɲ/	gnierv ‘nerve‘
h	usually silent /h/ in loanwords	habitaziun ‘habitation‘ haluncs ‘crooks‘
i	/i/	ti ‘you‘
ia	/ɪ̯a/	siat ‘seven‘
ie	/ɪə̯/	caschiel ‘cheese‘
iu	/ɪʊ̯/	ischiu ‘vinegar‘
iau	/ɪ̯aʊ̯/	cumiau ‘farewell‘
j	/j/	jamna ‘week‘
l	/l/	legums ‘vegetables‘
m	/m/	mir ‘wall‘
n	/n/	neiv ‘snow‘
o	/ɔ/	comba ‘leg‘
p	/p/	pur ‘farmer‘
r	/r/ or /ʁ/	raps - ‘money‘
s	/s/ /z/ /ʃ/ before c, m, n, p, t, tg /ʒ/ before b, d, g, v	sulegl ‘sun‘ casa ‘house‘ finiastra ‘window‘ sbagl ‘mistake‘
sch	/ʃ/ /ʒ/	cudisch ‘book‘ pischada - ‘butter‘
t	/t/	Turitg ‘Zurich‘
tsch	/tʃ/	tschiel ‘sky‘
tg	/tɕ/	tgaun ‘dog‘
u	/u/	tut ‘everything‘
ua	/ʊ̯a/	quater ‘four‘
ue	/ʊ̯ɛ/	quel ‘this one‘
uo	/ʊə̯/	buob ‘boy‘
uei	/ʊ̯ɛɪ̯/	quei ‘this‘
uau	/ʊ̯aʊ̯/	uaul ‘forest‘
v	/v/	luvrar ‘to work‘
z	/ts/	Svizra ‘Switzerland‘

== Morphology ==
=== Nouns ===
Sursilvan nouns distinguish two genders (masculine and feminine) and two numbers (singular and plural).

Nouns in -a are overwhelmingly feminine (with few exceptions such as duca 'duke'). Nouns in consonants or other vowels can be either masculine or feminine.

Plurals are formed with the suffix -s. Nouns already ending in -s do not add this plural ending, but nouns in -z and -sch follow the general rule. Nominalised past participles in -au have a plural in -ai. In addition, nouns may show vowel alternations or other irregularities:

Type	singular	plural	Meaning (gender)
Regular + -s	frar	frars	brother (M.)
	sora	soras	sister (F.)
	esch	eschs	door (M.)
	péz	pézs	summit (M.)
-s > -s	nas	nas	nose (M.)
-(t)schi > -(t)schals	purschi	purschals	piglet (M.)
	utschi	utschals	bird (M.)
-i > -ials	marti	martials	hammer (M.)
-agl > -als	cavagl	cavals	horse (M.)
-egl > -els	cavegl	cavels	hair (M.)
-iel > -euls	migiel	migeuls	glass (M.)
-al > -auls	armal	armauls	ox (M.)
-au > -ai	delegau	delegai	delegate (M.)
-ie- > -o- + -s	iev	ovs	egg (M.)
	tgiern	corns	horn (M.)
	ies	oss	bone (M.)
	tgaubriechel	tgaubrochels	somersault (M.)
-ie- > -o- + -s (with irreg.)	piertg	pors	pig (M.)
	bov	bos	ox (M.)
-ie- > -ia- + -s	vierm	viarms	worm (M.)
-ie- > -ia- (no -s)	viers	viars	animal noise (M.)
-ie- > -a- + -s	tschierv	tscharvs	stag (M.)
Irregular	um	umens	man (M.)
	dunna	dunnauns (also: dunnas)	woman (F.)
	matta	mattauns (also: mattas)	girl (F.)
	liug	loghens (also: logs)	place (M.)

==== Collective plurals ====
In addition to the normal plural in -s many nouns also show a collective plural in -a. These forms typically occur with natural substances (rocks, wood, plants etc.) and human body parts. Syntactically these collective plurals behave like feminine singular nouns: La crappa ei dira. 'The rocks are hard. / The rock (= material) is hard.' (with F.SG. dira 'hard' agreeing with the subject la crappa 'the rock(s)') and may best be considered as an intermediate formation between inflection and derivation.

=== Articles ===
Sursilvan has both a definite and an indefinite article. These are preposed and agree with their noun in gender and number. (The indefinite article only has singular forms.) Forms may differ depending on whether the following word starts with a vowel or a consonant:

==== Indefinite Article ====
MASC.	in fegl	'son'
	in amitg	'male friend'
FEM. before cons.	ina feglia	'daughter'
FEM. before vowel	in'amitga	'female friend'

==== Definite Article ====
		singular	plural	
MASC.	before cons.	il bab	ils babs	'father'
MASC.	before vowel	igl aug	ils augs	'uncle'
FEM.	before cons.	la mumma	las mummas	'mother'
FEM.	before vowel	l'onda	las ondas	'aunt'

The definite article contracts with a number of prepositions:

	il	igl	la	l'	ils	las
a 'to'	al	agl	alla	all'	als	allas
cun 'with'	cul	cugl	culla	cull'	culs	cullas
da 'of, by'	dil	digl	dalla	dall'	dils	dallas
en 'in(to)'	el	egl	ella	ell'	els	ellas
per 'for'	pil	pigl	pella	pell'	pils	pellas
sin 'on (to)'	sil	sigl	silla	sill'	sils	sillas
sper 'beside'	spel	spegl	spella	spell'	spels	spellas
tier 'to, at'	tiel	tiegl	tiella	tiell'	tiels	tiellas

=== Adjectives ===
The adjective agrees with its noun in gender and number and (as in other Romance languages) usually follows it.

A peculiarity of Sursilvan is that the adjective distinguishes an attributive and a predicative form in the masculine singular:

in um vegl 'an old man'
igl um ei vegls 'the man is old'

The predicative masculine singular form is morphologically identical with the masculine plural.

The ending of the masculine plural is -s. Feminine adjectives suffix -a in the singular and -as in the plural. The attributive masculine singular often differs from the other forms in its vocalism.

	M.SG.ATTR.	M.SG.PRED/M.PL.	F.SG.	F.PL.	
Regular	grond	gronds	gronda	grondas	'big'
-gl > -gli-	vegl	vegls	veglia	veglias	'old'
-tg > -gi-	lartg	lartgs	largia	largias	'wide, broad'
-C > -CC	met	mets	metta	mettas	'dumb'
-el > -l-	fideivel	fideivels	fideivla	fideivlas	'faithful'
-en > -n-	giuven	giuvens	giuvna	giuvnas	'young'
-er > -r-	pauper	paupers	paupra	paupras	'poor'
Irreg.	pign	pigns	pintga	pintgas	'small'
	agen	agens	atgna	atgnas	'own'
-i > -ial-	bi	bials	biala	bialas	'beautiful'
-ie- > -ia-	aviert	aviarts	aviarta	aviartas	'open(ed)'
-(t)schie- > -(t)scha-	detschiert	detscharts	detscharta	detschartas	'resolute'
-ie- > -ia- + -er > -r-	siniester	siniasters	siniastra	siniastras	'left'
-ie- > -o-	niev	novs	nova	novas	'new'
	gries	gross	grossa	grossas	'thick'
	tgietschen	cotschens	cotschna	cotschnas	'red'
-ie- > -u-	bien	buns	buna	bunas	'good'
Irreg.	bia	biars	biara	biaras	'much'

=== Pronouns ===
==== Personal pronouns ====
		singular		plural
		subject	object	plural
1st person		jeu	mei (but: a mi)	nus
2nd person		ti	tei (but: a ti)	vus
3rd person	MASC	el		els
3rd person	FEM	ella		ellas

- Modern Sursilvan has no unstressed proclitic personal pronouns appearing in preverbal position (as in French je l'ai vu 'I have seen him') and only uses the (historically) stressed forms, which appear in the same position as nouns: jeu hai viu el 'I have seen him'.
- In the 1Sg and 2Sg the special dative forms mi and ti exist, which are used after the preposition a(d) 'to'. In the 3Sg agli is occasionally used instead of ad el.
- In the 3rd person Sursilvan has a neuter pronoun ei (igl before ei 'is'): ei plova 'it rains', igl ei tard 'it is late'. This pronoun is also used as an expletive pronoun in sentences like ei vegn ora in drag cun siat tgaus 'there emerges [lit: it comes out] a dragon with seven heads'. The same form can be used with 3Pl verb forms as a gender-neutral 'they/people' (French on, German man): ei dian 'they/people say'.

==== Demonstrative pronouns ====
	NEUT	MASC		FEM	
	SG	SG	PL	SG	PL
Pron.	quei 'this'	quel	quels	quella	quellas
Adj.	—N/a	quei	quels	quella	quellas
Pron.	tschei 'that'	tschel	tschels	tschella	tschellas
Adj.	—N/a	tschei	tschels	tschella	tschellas
Pron. & Adj.	quest 'this'	quest	quests	questa	questas

- The proximal pronoun quel 'this' and the distal pronoun tschel 'that' have different forms in the masc. sg. depending on whether they are used adjectivally with a noun or pronominally on their own (referring to a masculine noun): El va vitier quei um vegl, e quel gi,... 'he goes to this old man, and this one says...'.
- Quel and tschel have pronominal neuter forms quei and tschei (formally identical with the adjectival masculine forms).
- Quest, which in other Rhetoromance dialects serves as proximal demonstrative, is in modern Sursilvan limited to fixed expression such quest onn 'this year', questa sera 'this evening'.

== Sample ==
The fable The Fox and the Crow by Jean de La Fontaine in Sursilvan, as well as a translation into English, the similar-looking but noticeably different-sounding dialect Sutsilvan, and Rumantsch Grischun.

Sursilvan audio	Sutsilvan	Rumantsch Grischun audio	Translation
L'uolp era puspei inagada fomentada. Cheu ha ella viu sin in pegn in tgaper che teneva in toc caschiel en siu bec. Quei gustass a mi, ha ella tertgau, ed ha clamau al tgaper: «Tgei bi che ti eis! Sche tiu cant ei aschi bials sco tia cumparsa, lu eis ti il pli bi utschi da tuts».	La gualp eara puspe egn'eada fumantada. Qua â ella vieu sen egn pegn egn corv ca taneva egn toc caschiel ainten sieus pecel. Quegl gustass a mei, â ella tartgieu, ed ha clamo agli corv: «Tge beal ca tei es! Scha tieus tgànt e aschi beal sco tia pareta, alura es tei igl ple beal utschi da tuts».	La vulp era puspè ina giada fomentada. Qua ha ella vis sin in pign in corv che tegneva in toc chaschiel en ses pichel. Quai ma gustass, ha ella pensà, ed ha clamà al corv: «Tge bel che ti es! Sche tes chant è uschè bel sco tia parita, lur es ti il pli bel utschè da tuts».	The fox was hungry yet again. There he saw a raven upon a fir holding a piece of cheese in its beak. This I would like, he thought, and shouted at the raven: "You are so beautiful! If your singing is as beautiful as your looks, then you are the most beautiful of all birds.".

== Culture ==
The Swiss vocal group Furbaz mainly performs in the Sursilvan variety of Romansh. Their entry representing Switzerland in the Eurovision Song Contest 1989, Viver senza tei, was sung in Sursilvan. They placed 13th out of 22 participating countries with 47 points. It is the only time to date in which Switzerland have sent an entry to the contest in Romansh.

== Bibliography ==
- Bernardi, Rut, & H. Stricker, & Società Retorumantscha, & Verein für Bündner Kulturforschung (1994), Handwörterbuch des Rätoromanischen : Wortschatz aller Schriftsprachen, einschliesslich Rumantsch Grischun, mit Angaben zur Verbreitung und Herkunft; erarbeitet auf Initiative von Hans Stricker; herausgegeben von der Società Retorumantscha und dem Verein für Bündner Kulturforschung. Zürich: Offizin.
- Cahannes, Gion, & Ligia romontscha (1924), Grammatica romontscha per Surselva e Sutselva, Ediziun della Ligia romontscha. Mustér: Stampa da G. Condrau.
- Da Sale, Flaminio (1729), Fundamenti principali della lingua retica, o griggiona, con le regole del declinare i nomi, e congiugare i verbi, all'uso di due delle principali valli della Rezia, cioe di Sopraselva e di Sorset che può servire alli italiani per imparare [...], Disentis : Francesco Antonio Binn. [Online: copy (1), copy (2).]
- Decurtins, Alexis (2001), Niev vocabulari romontsch sursilvan - tudestg / Neues rätoromanisches Wörterbuch surselvisch-deutsch, Chur. ISBN 3-03900-999-0.
- Eichenhofer, Wolfgang (1999), Historische Lautlehre des Bünderromanischen. Tübingen: Francke.
- Gartner, Theodor (1883), Raetoromanische Grammatik. (Sammlung romanischer Grammatiken.) Heilbronn: Gebr. Henninger. [Online: copy (1), copy (2), copy (3).]
- Gregor, D.B. (1982), Romontsch : Language and literature : The sursilvan Raeto-Romance of Switzerland. (Oleander language and literature; 11). Cambridge: Oleander.
- Gross, Manfred (2004). Romanisch: Facts & Figures (PDF). Translated by Evans, Mike; Evans, Barbara. Chur: Lia Rumantscha. ISBN 3-03900-037-3. Archived from the original (PDF) on 2013-11-04.
- Janzing, Gereon (2006), Rätoromanisch Wort für Wort, Reise Know-How Verlag Rump. ISBN 3-89416-365-8 (Deals in spite of its title only with Sursilvan).
- Liver, Ricarda (1982). Manuel pratique de romanche : Sursilvan-vallader : Précis de grammaire suivi d'un choix de textes. (Romanica Raetica; t. 4). Chur: Ligia Romontscha.
- Liver, Ricarda (1999). Rätoromanisch : Eine Einführung in das Bündnerromanische [Rhaeto-Romanic: An introduction to the Romansh language]. Narr Studienbücher (in German). Tübingen: G. Narr.
- Lutz, Florentin, & Dieter Strehle (1988), Rückläufiges Wörterbuch des Surselvischen = Dicziunari invers dil romontsch sursilvan. (Romanica Monacensia; 29). Tübingen: Narr.
- Nay, Sep Modest, & Ramun Vieli, & Ligia romontscha (1948), Lehrbuch der rätoromanischen Sprache (deutsch-surselvisch). (2. Aufl. / im Auftrage der Ligia Romontscha besorgt von Ramun Vieli. ed.). [Chur]: Ligia Romontscha.
- Spescha, Arnold (1989), Grammatica sursilvana, Lehrmittelverlag Graubünden, Chur. (This grammar is entirely written in Romansh.)
- Vieli, Ramun (1938), Vocabulari scursaniu romontsch-tudestg, redigius da dr. Ramun Vieli. Ediziun della Ligia romontscha 1938. Mustér: G. Condrau.
- Vieli/Decurtins (1994), Vocabulari tudestg - romontsch sursilvan, Lia Rumantscha.

Sursilvan literature is published among others by the Lia Rumantscha in Chur.
