= Cadi (Surselva) =

Coordinates: 46.705605°N 8.863043°E

Cadi ([kɐˈdi]), the Sursilvan for "House of God" (Casa Dei), is the historical name of Disentis Abbey and its feudal territories, later part of the Grey League.

The territories in the upper Anterior Rhine valley (Surselva) were given to Disentis Abbey, and thus removed from the direct rule of Raetia Curiensis, by Tello, Bishop of Chur (d. 765). The territory was divided into Sursassiala ("above the gorge", referring to Punt Russein) and Sutsassiala ("below the gorge"). Sursassiala comprised the modern municipalities of Disentis/Mustér, Medel (Lucmagn) and Tujetsch (the latter containing the upper reaches of the Anterior Rhine, with no permanent settlements until the 9th century), Sutsassiala included Sumvitg, Trun and Breil/Brigels. The subjects of Disentis Abbey first used their own seal in 1285. They had their own Landammann (mistral) from 1371. Cadi became an autonomous commune (cumin grond) of the Grey League in 1401. From 1472, the mistral was elected from a ticket of three candidates proposed by the abbot, from the 17th century in free elections. Until 1851, Cadi was divided into four jurisdictions (cuorts) Disentis, Tujetsch, Brigels with Medel, and Trun with Sumvitg.

During 1738–1745, the communes of Cadi purchased their freedom from tithes to the abbey. Cadi as a feudal territory was formally dissolved with the formation of the Canton of Raetia, in 1799, but its organisational structure was preserved until 1851, with two votes in the diet of the Grey League, and from 1803 between two and five representatives in the cantonal legislature of Grisons. The new cantonal constitution of 1851 abandoned the courts, establishing the modern municipalities, forming the Circul da Cadi (Kreis Disentis) within Vorderrhein District (1851–2000), briefly Surselva District (2001–2016), and since 2017 within Surselva Region.
