= Surmiran dialect =

Central variety of the Romansh language

Surmiran
- surmiran
- Region: Surmeir, Albula Valley
- Language family: Indo-European: Italic; Latino-Faliscan; Romance; Italo-Western; Western Romance; Gallo-Romance; Rhaeto-Romance or Gallo-Rhaetian; Romansh; Surmiran
- Writing system: Latin script

Language codes
- ISO 639-3: –
- Glottolog: surm1243
- IETF: rm-surmiran

Surmiran (Surmiran, Vallader, Sutsilvan, Rumantsch Grischun: sursilvan; Puter: surmiraun) is a dialect of the Romansh language. It is spoken in Surmeir and in the Albula Valley in the Grisons Canton, in Switzerland.

Some authors have cultivated literature in Surmiran, notably the Capuchin monk Alexander Lozza.

== The "Hail Mary" and the "Our father" in Surmiran ==
Salidada seias te, Maria,
plagna da gratzga,
igl Signer è cun tè,
te ist la banadeida tranter las dunans,
e banadia è igl fretg digl ties best, Jesus.

Sontga Maria, mama da dia,
roia per nous putgants
ossa e sen l'oura da la nossa mort.
Amen.

Bab tgi te ist ainten tschiel,

santifitgia seia igl ties nom.

Igl ties reginavel vigna.

La tia viglia davanta sen terra scu ainten tschiel.

Igl noss pagn da mintgadé do a nous oz.

E pardugna a nous igls noss debits,

scu tgi nous perdunagn ad igls noss debitours.

Betg lasch'ans crudar an malampruamaint,

ma spendra nous digl mal.

Amen.
