= Val Ferrera =

Valley in Switzerland

Coordinates: 46°33′N 9°26′E

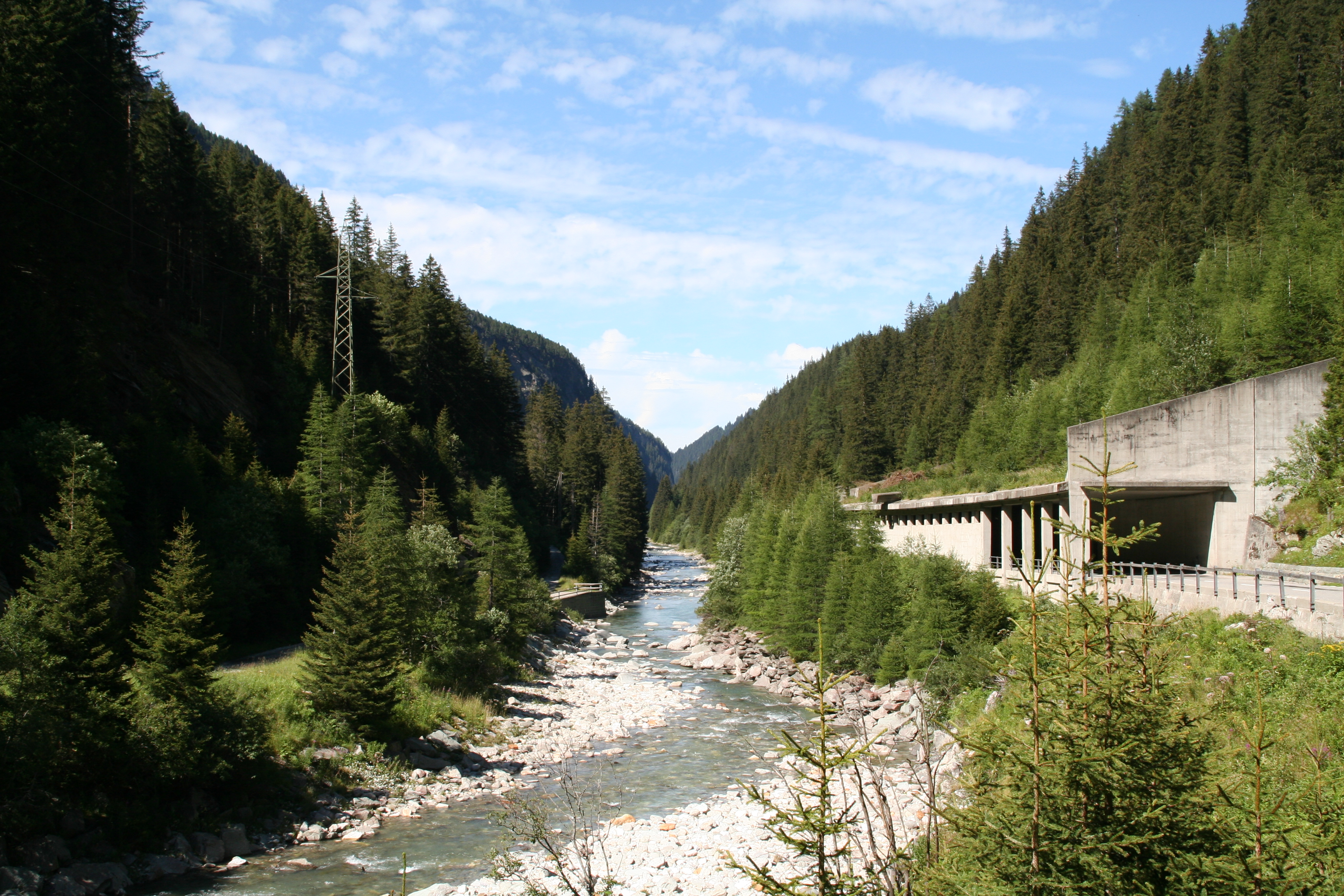
View of the north

The Ferrera Valley (Romansh: Val Ferrera, German: Ferreratal) is a valley in the Swiss canton of Graubünden between Schams and Avers. It is 10 km long and is drained by the Avers Rhine. The only villages in the valley are Innerferrera and Ausserferrera. Administratively, the municipality of Ferrera coincides with the valley.

In the Early Modern period, the Ferrera Valley was known for its iron ore. The mining industry provided its inhabitants with a livelihood. The Schmelzra mine at the entrance of the valley, is now an industrial heritage site and has since 1972 been in the care of the cultural heritage management of the Canton of Graubünden.

Until the 20th century, a linguistic border separated the valley from Avers: in the Avers valley, people spoke a Walser German dialect, in the Ferrera Valley, people spoke Romansh. In both valleys, the dominant religion is the Swiss Reformed Church.

== Gallery ==
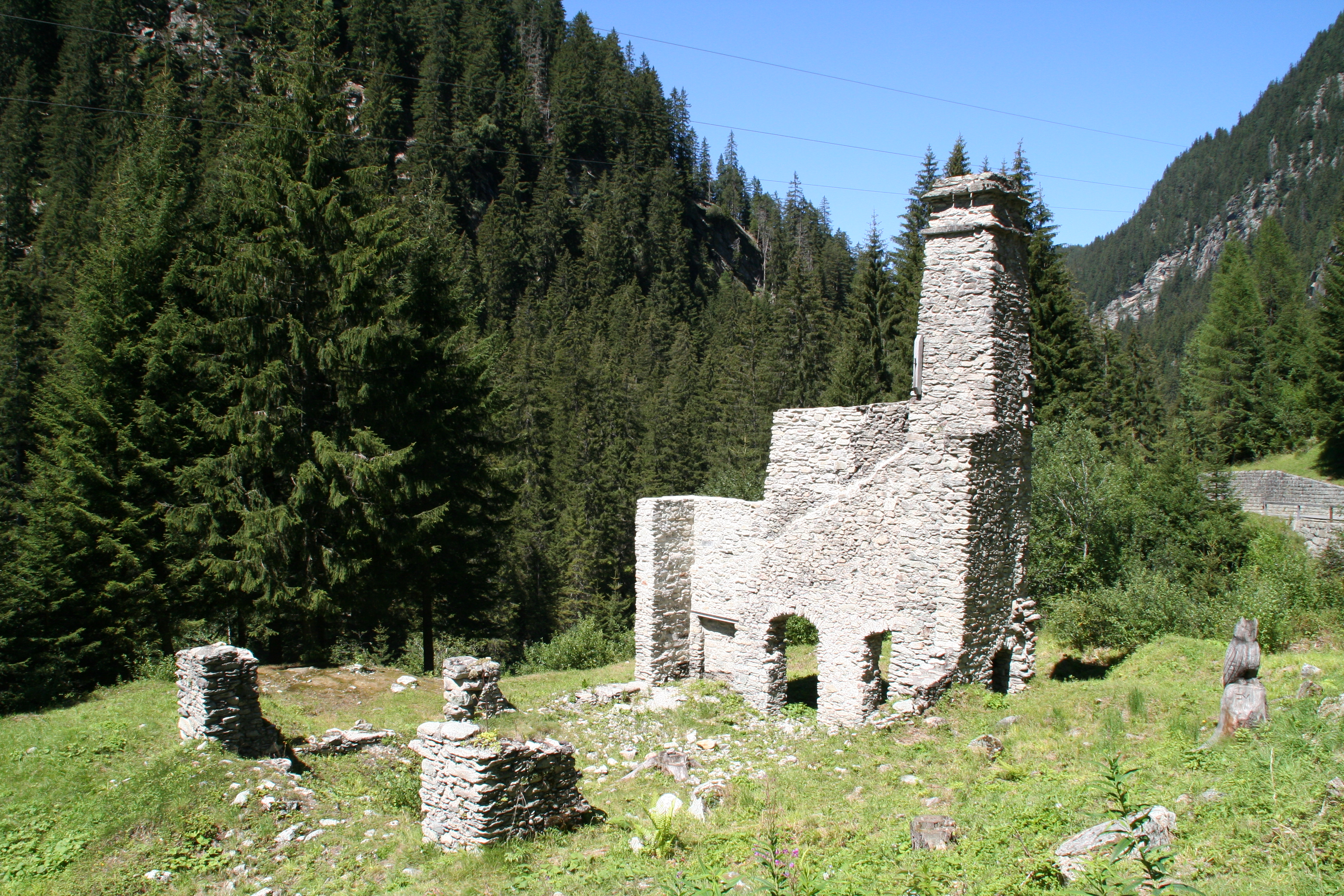
Ruins of a smelter works

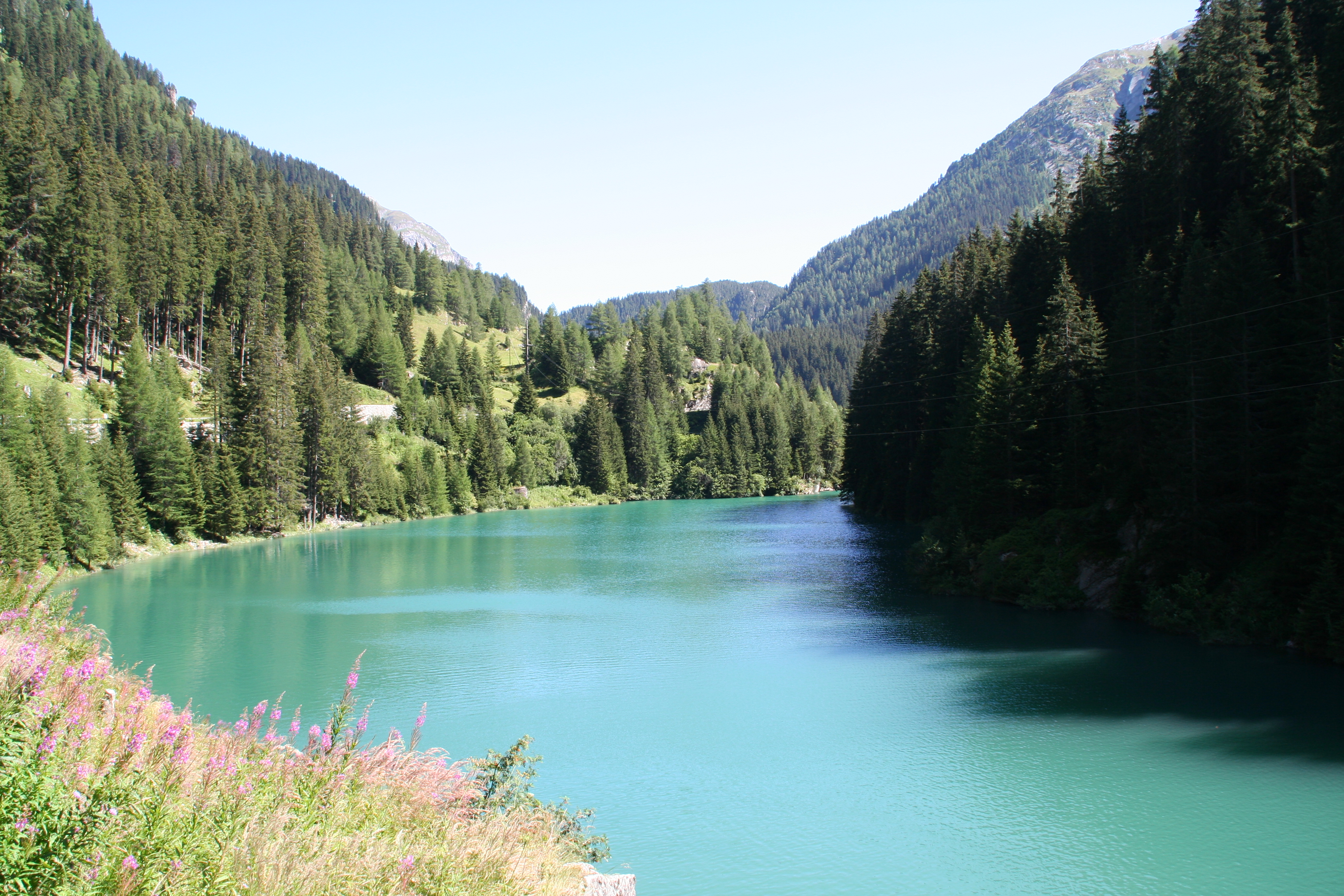
Reservoir at the Ferrera Dotier Works

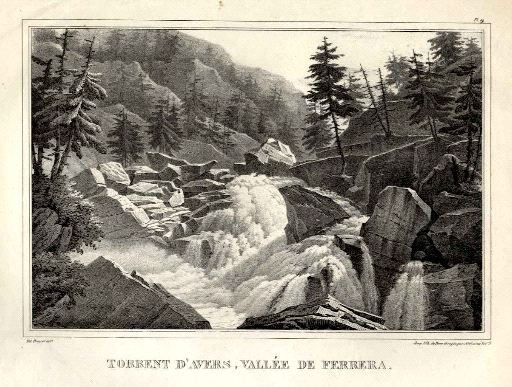
Avers Rhine in the Ferrera Valley, lithograph from 1827
