= Rofla Gorge =

River gorge in Swiss canton of Graubünden

- Romansh: Puntcrap, German: Roflaschlucht
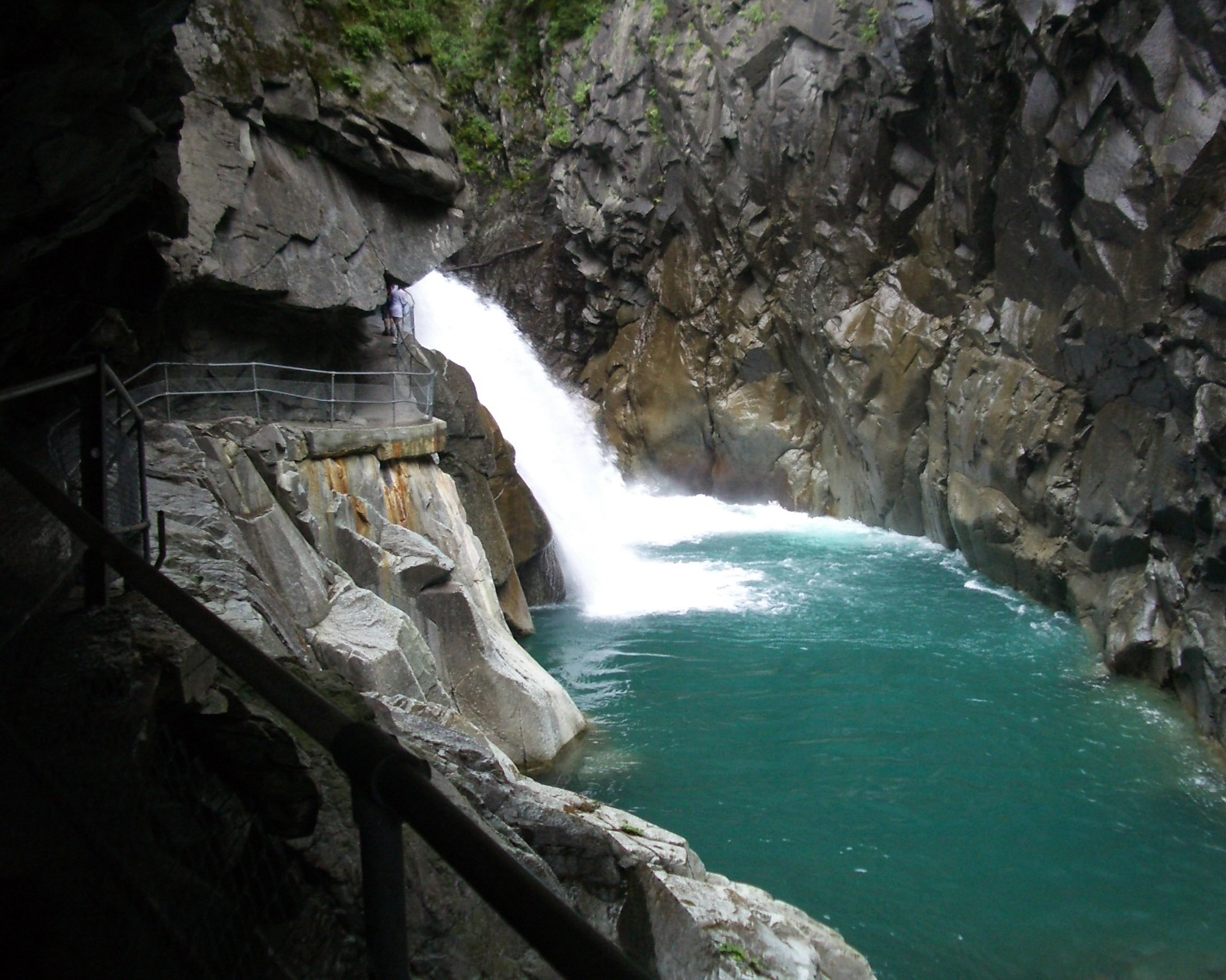
- Rofla Gorge footpath

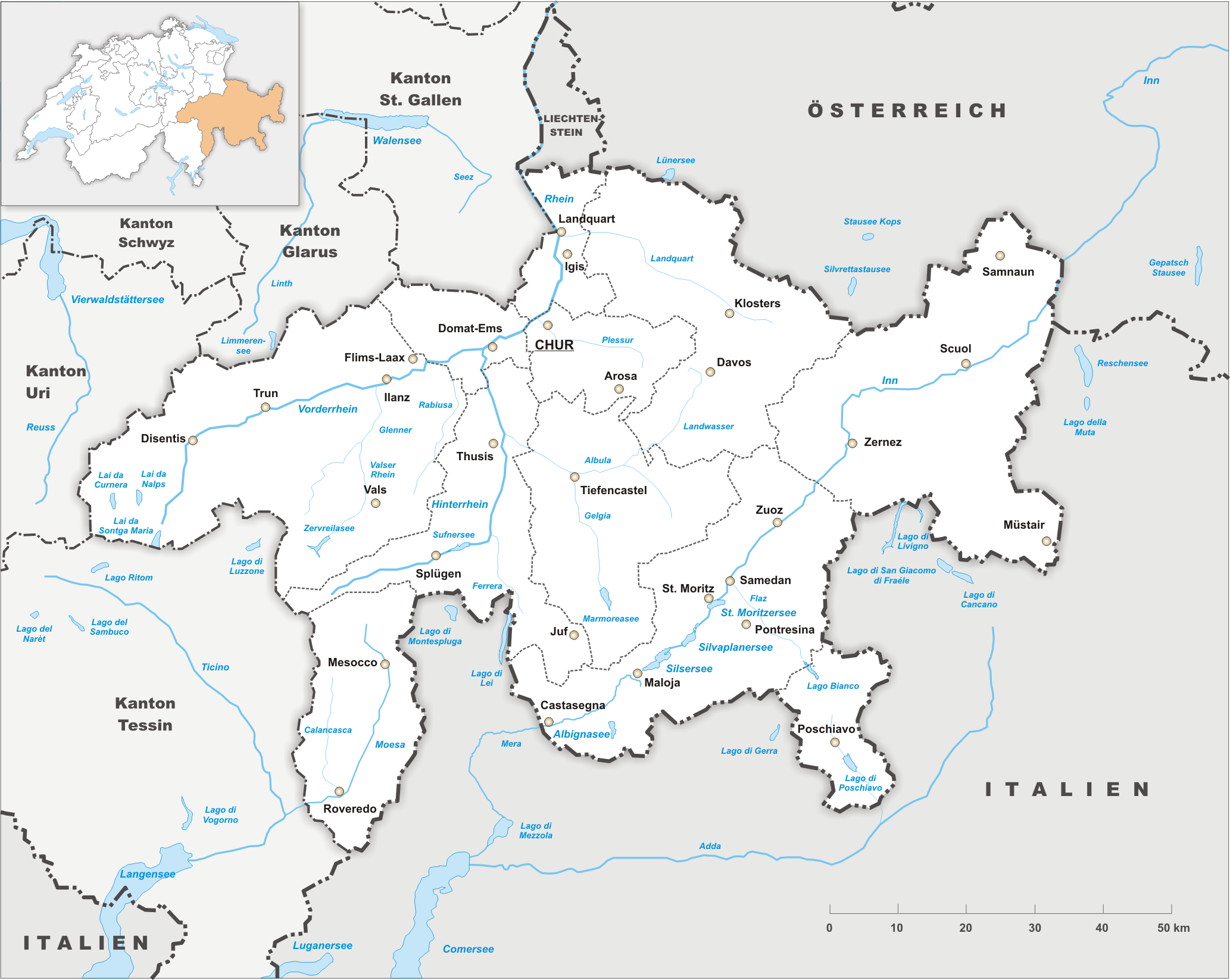
- Floor elevation: approx. 1,144 metres (3,800 ft)
- Length: 2 kilometres (1.2 mi)
- Width: 0.5 to 0.012 kilometres (0.3107 to 0.0075 mi)

Geography
- Location: The Grisons
- Coordinates: 46°20′N 9°15′E
- Traversed by: San Bernardino route
- Rivers: Rein Posteriur

The Rofla Gorge (Romansh: Puntcrap, German: Roflaschlucht) is an ancient and narrow section of the river Hinterrhein/Rein Posteriur between Sufers and Andeer in the canton of Graubünden. This narrow gorge was another obstacle on the approach to the two mountain passes Splügen Pass und San Bernardino Pass in addition to the Viamala gorge.

== Modern era ==
Nowadays the mountains can be crossed on the A13 motorway, opened in 1967, which passes through the San Bernardino Tunnel and is therefore open all year round (whereas both passes were closed in winter). The older, main road passes the hotel at the entrance of the gorge, from where there is a footpath to and under the waterfall. The path was built from 1907 to 1914 by the family who owned the hotel.

== See also ==
- List of highest paved roads in Europe
- List of mountain passes
- List of canyons
