= Lia Rumantscha =

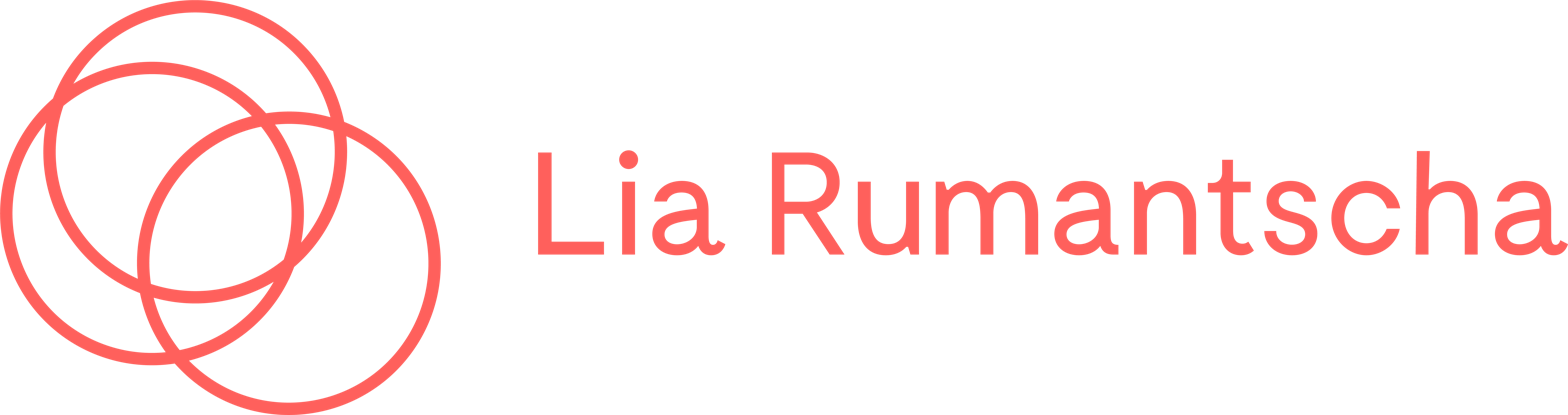
Logo (2022)

Lia Rumantscha (Romansh: [liɐ̯ruˈmantʃɐ]) is an organization that promotes Romansh language usage and study.

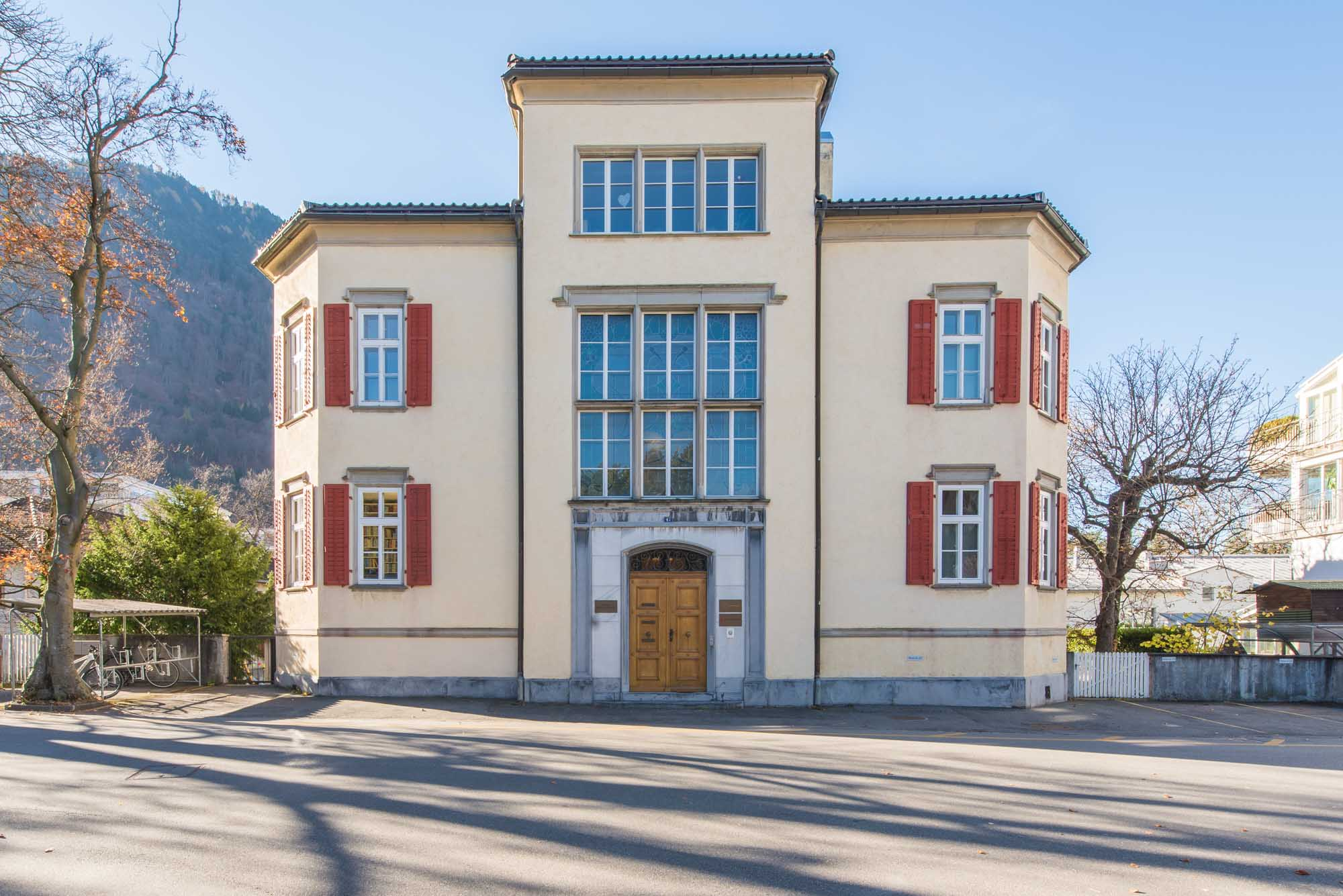
Seat of Lia Rumantscha in Chur

Established in 1919, its seat is in Chur. The organization is a member of the Federal Union of European Nationalities since 1954.

Some examples of services offered by the Lia Rumantscha are: the Pledari Grond Online linguistic database, a translation service into Rumantsch Grischun and the five dialects, Romansh and integration courses (including certification), books and media for children and young people, and an online bookstore with over 3,000 items.
