= Sutsilvan dialects =

Dialect of the Romansh language

Sutsilvan
- sutsilvan
- Pronunciation: Romansh pronunciation: [sutsilˈvaːn]
- Native to: Domleschg, Heinzenberg, Schams, and Val Ferrera in Switzerland
- Language family: Indo-European: Italic; Latino-Faliscan; Romance; Italo-Western; Western Romance; Gallo-Romance; Rhaeto-Romance or Gallo-Rhaetian; Romansh; Sutsilvan
- Writing system: Latin script

Language codes
- ISO 639-3: –
- Glottolog: suts1235
- IETF: rm-sutsilv

Sutsilvan (Rumantsch Grischun: sutsilvan; Vallader: suotsilvan; Putèr: suotsilvaun; derived from sut "below" and selva "forest") is a dialect of the Romansh language spoken in Domleschg, Heinzenberg, Schams, and Val Ferrera, Canton of Graubünden, Switzerland.

Since 1601 it has a written form: a cathecismus for school use. There is an individual dictionary for this dialect.

== Bibliography ==
- Corrado Conforti, Linda Cusimano, Bartolome Tscharner: An lingia directa 1 – Egn curs da rumàntsch sutsilvan. Lia Rumantscha, Chur 1997–[1998], OCLC 77653447 (Lehrmittel mit Audio-CD).
- Wolfgang Eichenhofer (Red.): Pledari: sutsilvan – tudestg = Wörterbuch: Deutsch – Sutsilvan. Lehrmittelverlag des Kantons Graubünden, Chur 2002, OCLC 254183374.
- Anne-Louise Joël: Giuseppe Gangale und der Konflikt um die Acziún Sutselva Rumantscha, 1943–1949. In: Annalas da la Societad Retorumantscha 119, 2006, S. 97–130.
- Mathias Kundert: Der Sprachwechsel im Domleschg und am Heinzenberg (19. und 20. Jahrhundert) (= Quellen und Forschungen zur Bündner Geschichte. Band 18). Kommissionsverlag Desertina, Chur 2007, ISBN 978-3-85637-340-5.
- Clau Solèr, Theodor Ebneter: Heinzenberg/Mantogna Romanisch (= Schweizer Dialekte in Text und Ton. [Abt.] 4; Romanisch und Deutsch am Hinterrhein/GR. Heft 1). Verl. des Phonogrammarchivs der Universität Zürich, Zürich 1983, OCLC 886770256 (mit Tonbandkassette).
- Clau Solèr, Theodor Ebneter: Romanisch im Domleschg (= Schweizer Dialekte in Text und Ton. [Abt.] 4; Romanisch und Deutsch am Hinterrhein/GR. Band 3). Phonogrammarchiv der Universität Zürich, Zürich 1988, ISBN 3-907538-02-1 (mit Tonbandkassette).
