= Johann Rudolf Schneider =

Swiss physician, political leader and initiator of the Jura water correction

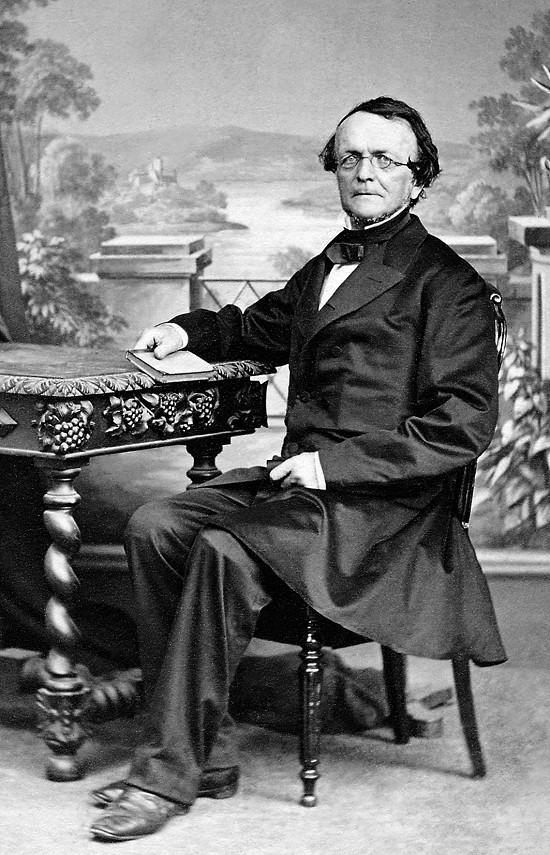
Johann Rudolf Schneider

Johann Rudolf Schneider (born 23 October 1804 in Meienried, Canton of Bern; died 14 January 1880) was a Swiss medical doctor, political leader, and initiator of the Jura water correction.

== Biography ==
He studied medicine in Bern, Berlin, and Paris.

In 1828, he settled in Nidau, where he opened a doctor's surgery. As a member of the association for preservation (Schutzverein) he committed himself to sanitization of the Grand Marais.

As early as 1834, Jan Pawel Lelewel, who had been chief engineer, had been committed with such a project His project however did not convince, neither the political parties, nor the involved Cantons could find an agreement.

In the year 1835, Schneider published a book on the recurring floods in Seeland. A year later, he was elected in the Grand Council of the Canton of Bern. In 1837 he successfully motioned that the planning and the execution of a Jura water correction to be committed to a private organization. Accordingly, 1840, he founded the "Society preparatory to the Jura water correction", (Vorbereitungs-Gesellschaft der Jura-Gewässer-Correction), which commissioned the Grisons canton engineer Richard La Nicca to draw and conceive a project.

In the political turmoil of the 1840s, the project was not pursued. Only upon the founding of the Federal State and the large floods in the 1850s, did the Jura water correction project rise to actuality again.

In 1868 it finally got started, with the drugging-out of the Nidau-Büren channel.

Schneider was philanthropist and a champion of the liberal movement. In the 1830s he supported political emigrants such as Giuseppe Mazzini, Karl Mathy and Jan Pawel Lelewel, who lived in exile in the region of Biel/Bienne. Schneider even bought a printing company, in order to enable the emigrants to publicize their political pamphlets. He also publicized a sum of a rational periodical during a period of 10 years. The printing house was later to be run by his political sympathizer, August Weingart.

From 1838 to 1850, Schneider was an executive member of the Bernese government. In this role, he directed 1847, together with Ulrich Ochsenbein and Jakob Stämpfli the memorable session of the government in Bern, which decided the Sonderbund War, which was to become the fundament of the foundation of the modern Federal State of Switzerland.

In 1848, Schneider became a member of the Swiss National Council, to which he belonged to the year 1862. He belonged to the radical wing of the Liberals As at the elections in 1850 in change of majority occurred in the Canton of Bern, Schneider resigned from the government.

In the autumn of 1850 he was called to become an in-house physician at the Inselspital, Bern.

Upon his death, he was buried on the Bremgartenfriedhof in Bern.
