= Cassanawald tunnel =

Swiss A13 road tunnel

Coordinates: 46.5366327°N 9.2251439°E

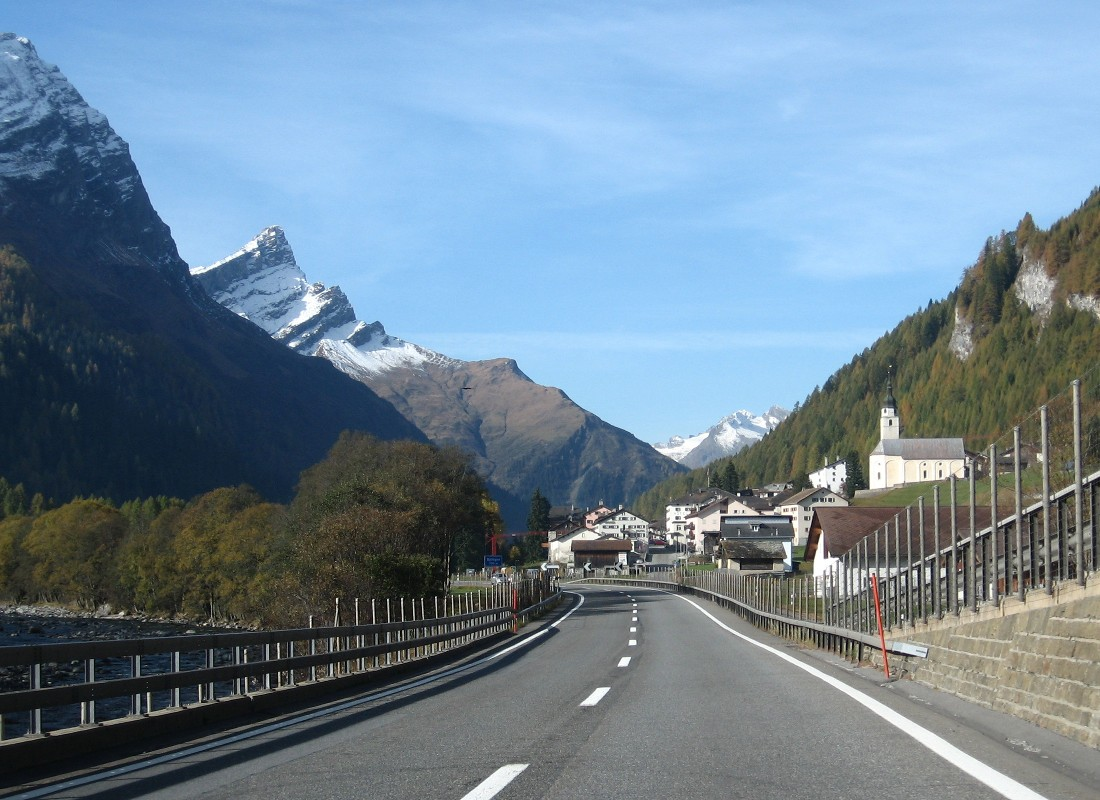
Splügen, on the A13

The Cassanawald tunnel is a 1,230 metres (4,040 ft) long tunnel on the A13 road in Switzerland, at an altitude of 1600 m.

It is a few km northeast of the San Bernardino tunnel and southwest of the Roflatunnel.

Unusually, a railway was laid through the road tunnel in order to ease access for maintenance and fireproofing work.
