= Viamala =

Gorge and pathway in Switzerland

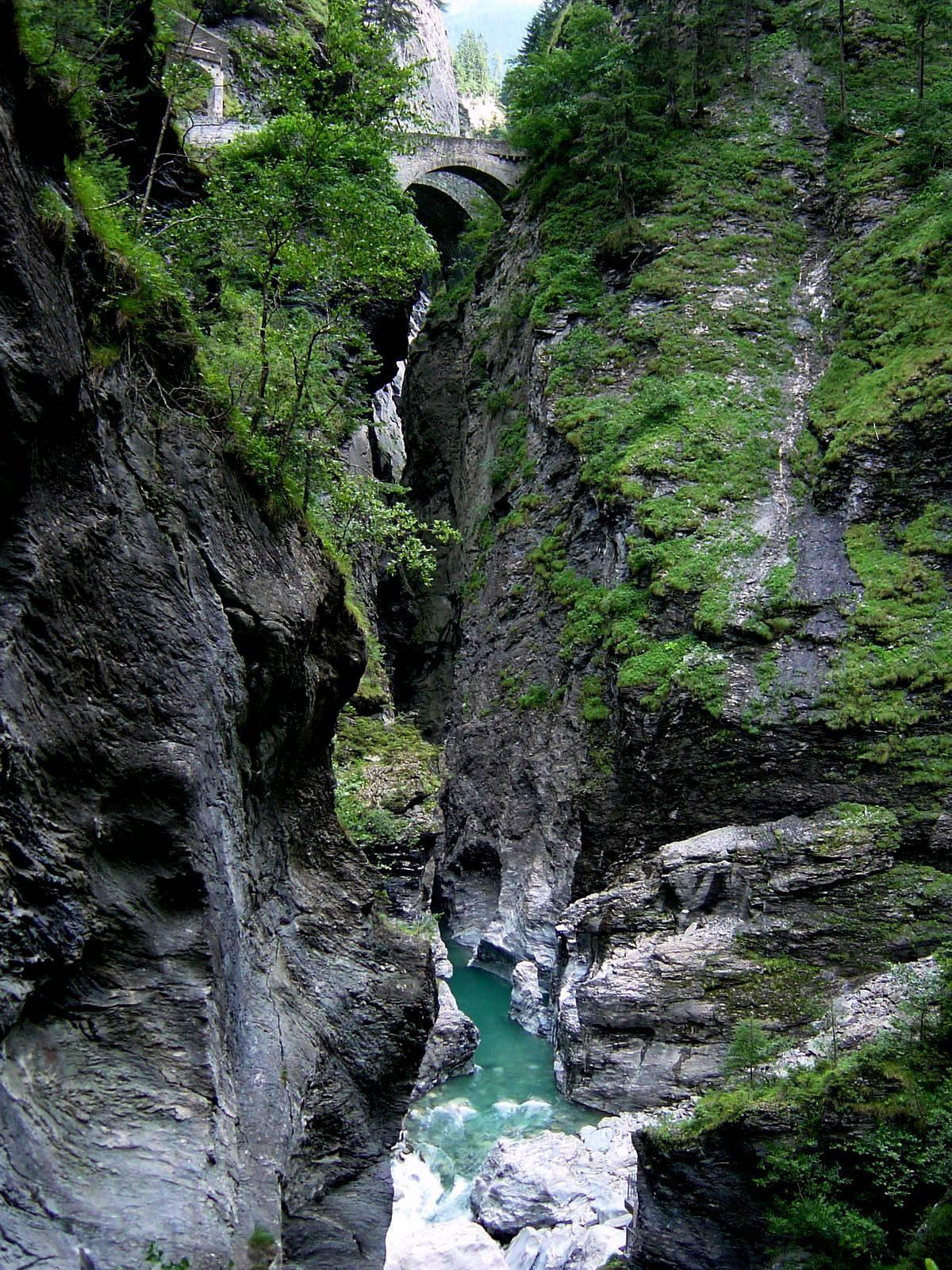
- Viamala with the two generations of bridges visible

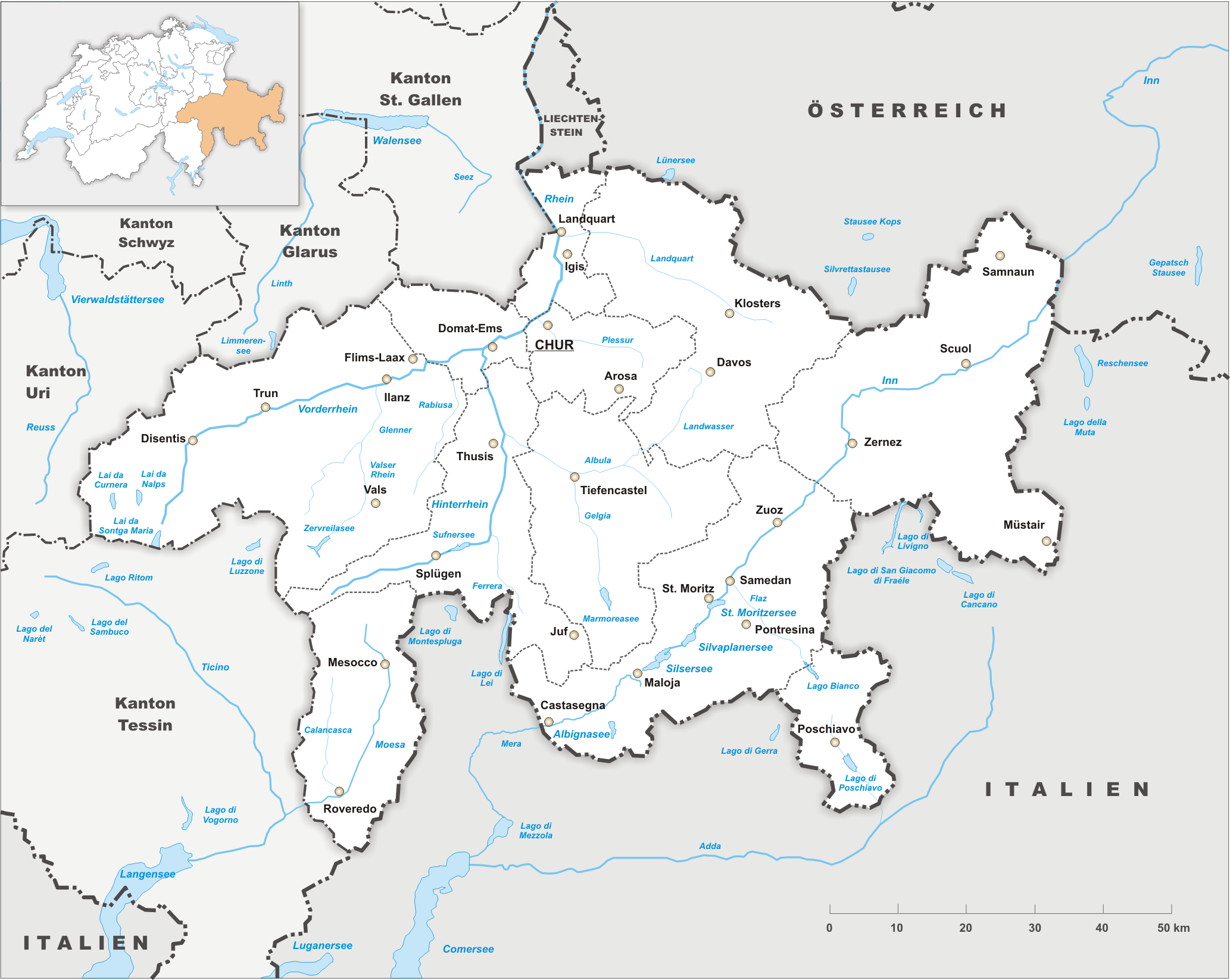
- Floor elevation: approx. 842 metres (2,800 ft)
- Length: 5 kilometres (3.1 mi)
- Width: 0.5 to 0.006 kilometres (0.3107 to 0.0037 mi)

Geography
- Location: Graubünden
- Coordinates: 46°39′46″N 9°26′56″E

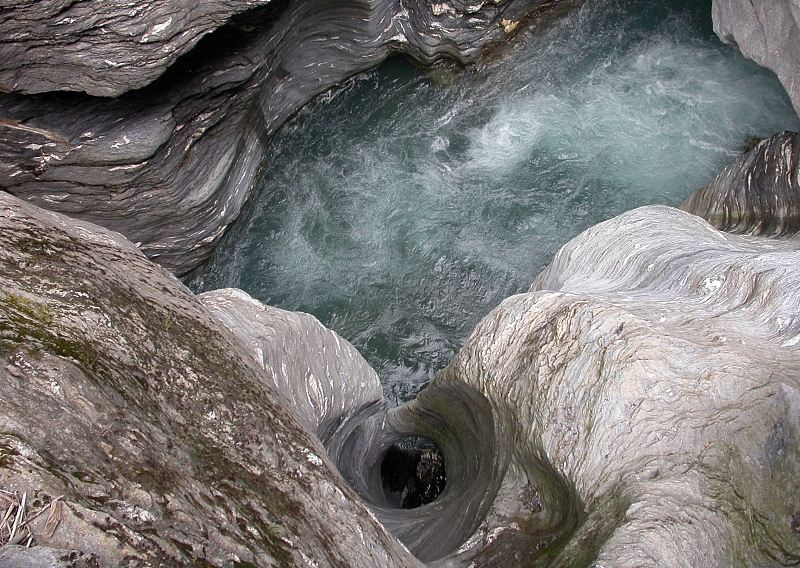
Pothole

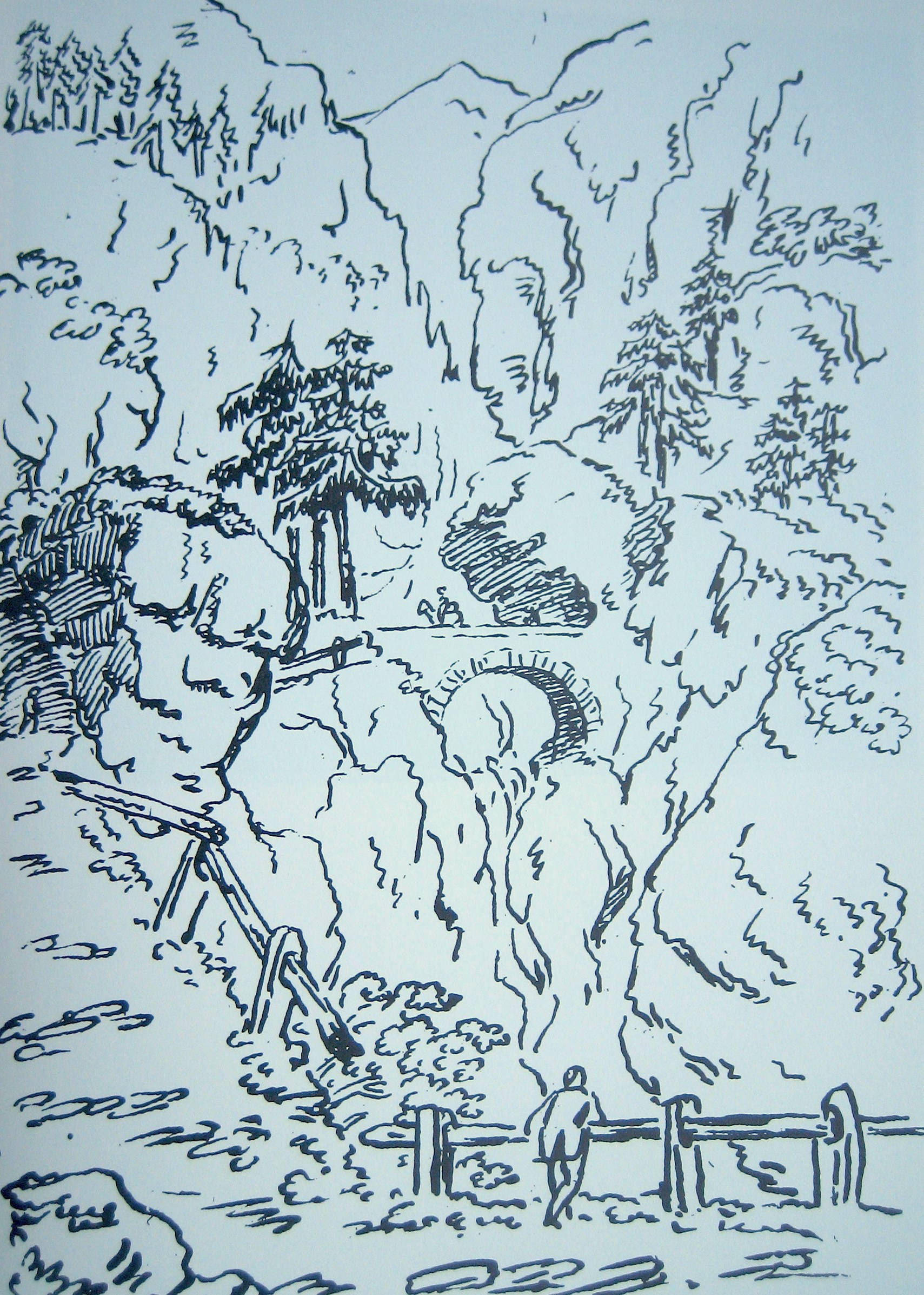
Viamala in a drawing by J. W. Goethe; 1 June 1788

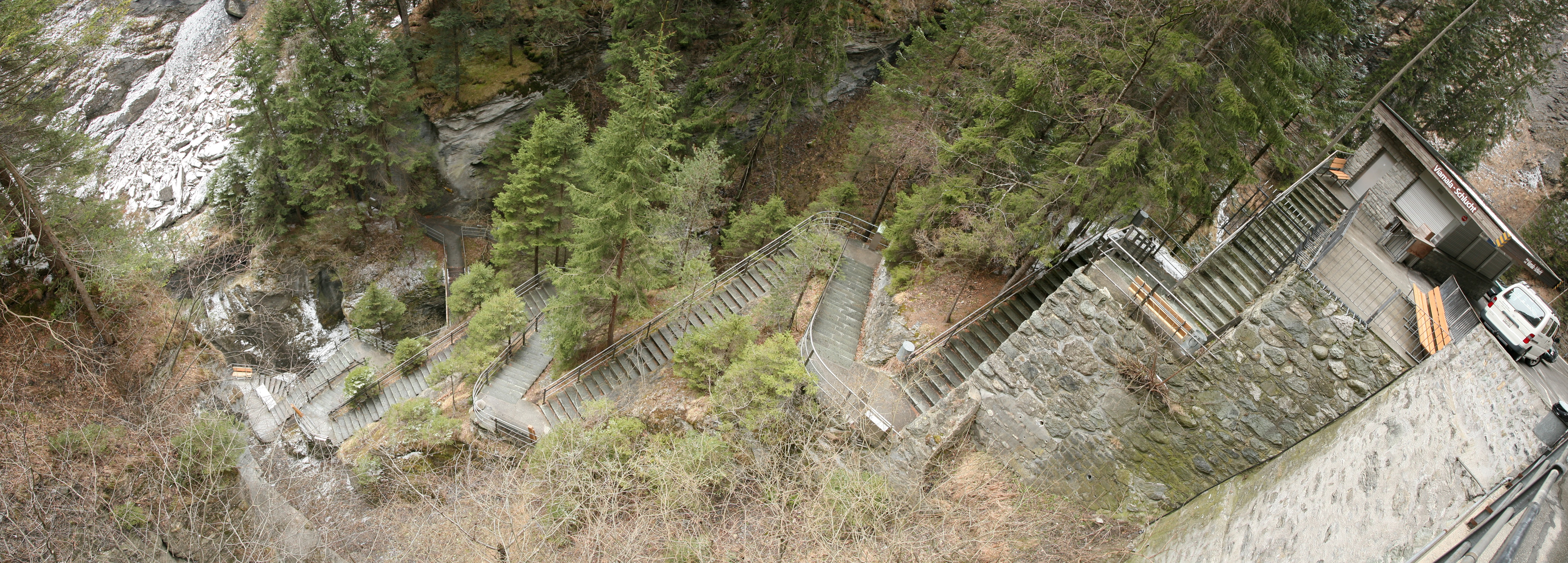
Tourist access at the gorge

Viamala or Via Mala (Romansh: literally, "bad path") is a narrow gorge along the river Hinterrhein between Zillis-Reischen and Thusis in the Canton of Graubünden, Switzerland, as well as the ancient and notorious pathway which traverses the gorge. Historically the Viamala was the most serious obstacle on the approach to the Splügen and San Bernardino mountain passes.

== History ==
=== Antiquity ===
A Viamala pathway already existed in Roman antiquity, though it is unclear whether it was only a foot and bridle path, or also passable by wagons. Two access paths met at the northern entrance to the Viamala gorge, which the Romans traversed by means of several rock galleries cut into the gorge's left walls. The Romans also constructed a wooden bridge crossing over to the right side of the Hinterrhein, routing traffic via Reischen to Zillis. Presumably this bridge was located somewhere below today's automobile bridge near the existing Pùnt da Suransuns pedestrian bridge.

=== 1473 Viamala letter of intent ===
During the medieval period more regional traffic used the Septimer Pass than the Splügen Pass. Charles IV, Holy Roman Emperor, supported this arrangement. He forbade the local Count of Werdenberg to build a new path in 1359 in order to support the loyal Bishop of Chur; the Bishop controlled Septimer Pass.

In 1473 the then Count of Werdenberg allowed the municipalities and transport cooperatives of Thusis, Masein, and Cazis to rebuild the passage, which was by then in poor condition: die richstrass und den waeg entzwüschend Tusis und Schams, so man nempt Fyamala zuo howen, uffzuorichten und ze machen.

The cooperatives renovated the Roman part of the path. They also built Punt da Tgiern, the first stone bridge on the Viamala. The Count of Werdenberg's 1473 letter required the cooperatives to design the new path for significant loads, including horses and a "chariot or sled", evincing a high level of technical sophistication. In the northern part of the gorge this new path did not follow the Roman crossing to the right of the river, but stayed on the left riverbank. This led to conflicts as the two villages at the respective ends of the path fought for access and the resulting income. In 1665 Schams was temporarily excluded from the Grey League for supporting the path towards Fürstenau, which led to non-Grey League territory.

=== Modern era ===
Between 1738 and 1739 Davos-based builder Christian Wildener constructed two bridges which crossed the river twice and avoided the worst part of the Roman path on the right riverbank. From 1818 to 1821 state engineer Richard La Nicca built a completely new road with tunnels connecting the three existing bridges. Access to the 1473 Punt da Tgiern bridge was destroyed in 1834, leaving the intact bridge useless and abandoned to decay. In 1836 the new Rania bridge replaced Punt da Tgiern farther north; it is still being used today for the main road.

An additional bridge called Premoli was constructed in 1936 to relieve the southern 1738-39 bridge. It is still in place as a footbridge. The northern 1738-39 bridge was replaced two years later, with no traces remaining.

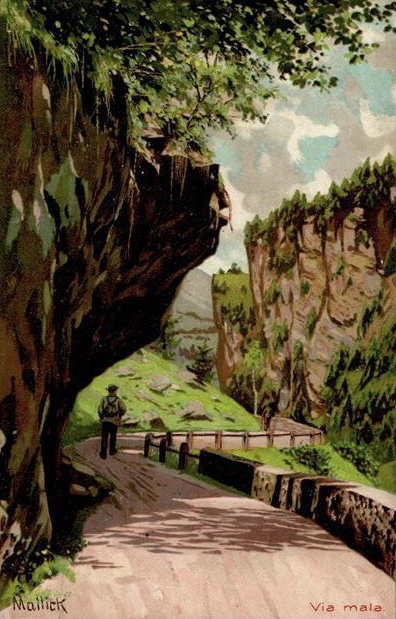
Via Mala by Alfred Mailick, c. 1904

In 1958 a new northern part of the road from Thusis to Rongellen was built using longer tunnels. In 1967 the new A13 expressway was opened including the San Bernardino Tunnel and allowing year-round traffic. Before this, both road passes closed in winter. This road uses a 742-metre (2,434 ft) long tunnel to avoid the Viamala gorge, crossing the gorge on a long suspension bridge in its southern part. Notable Swiss bridge engineer Christian Menn designed this concrete suspension bridge, which is known as the Great Viamala Bridge. In 1996 the original 1958 tunnels between Thusis and Rongellen were replaced by a 2,171-metre (7,123 ft) long tunnel called the Crapteig.

To connect the visible remains of the Roman path, a pedestrian bridge named the Traversinersteg was erected in 1996. In 1999 a rockslide destroyed this first Traversinersteg. It was replaced by a new bridge—Traversinersteg II—in 2005. Swiss civil engineer Jürg Conzett designed both Traversinersteg bridges, as well as the previously mentioned Pùnt da Suransuns.

German film director Werner Herzog filmed scenes in Viamala for his 1976 film Heart of Glass.

== See also ==
- List of highest paved roads in Europe
- List of mountain passes
