= Marscholsee =

Lake in the Grisons, Switzerland

- Location within Canton of Graubünden Location within Switzerland Location within Italy Location within Alps
- Interactive map of Marscholsee
- Location: Grisons
- Coordinates: 46.510°N 9.171°E
- Basin countries: Switzerland
- Surface elevation: 2,053 m (6,736 ft)

Marscholsee is a lake at San Bernardino Pass in the Grisons, Switzerland. The lake is located at an elevation of 2053 m.

The lake is stocked with brown trout.
