= Richard La Nicca =

Swiss civil engineer (1794–1883)

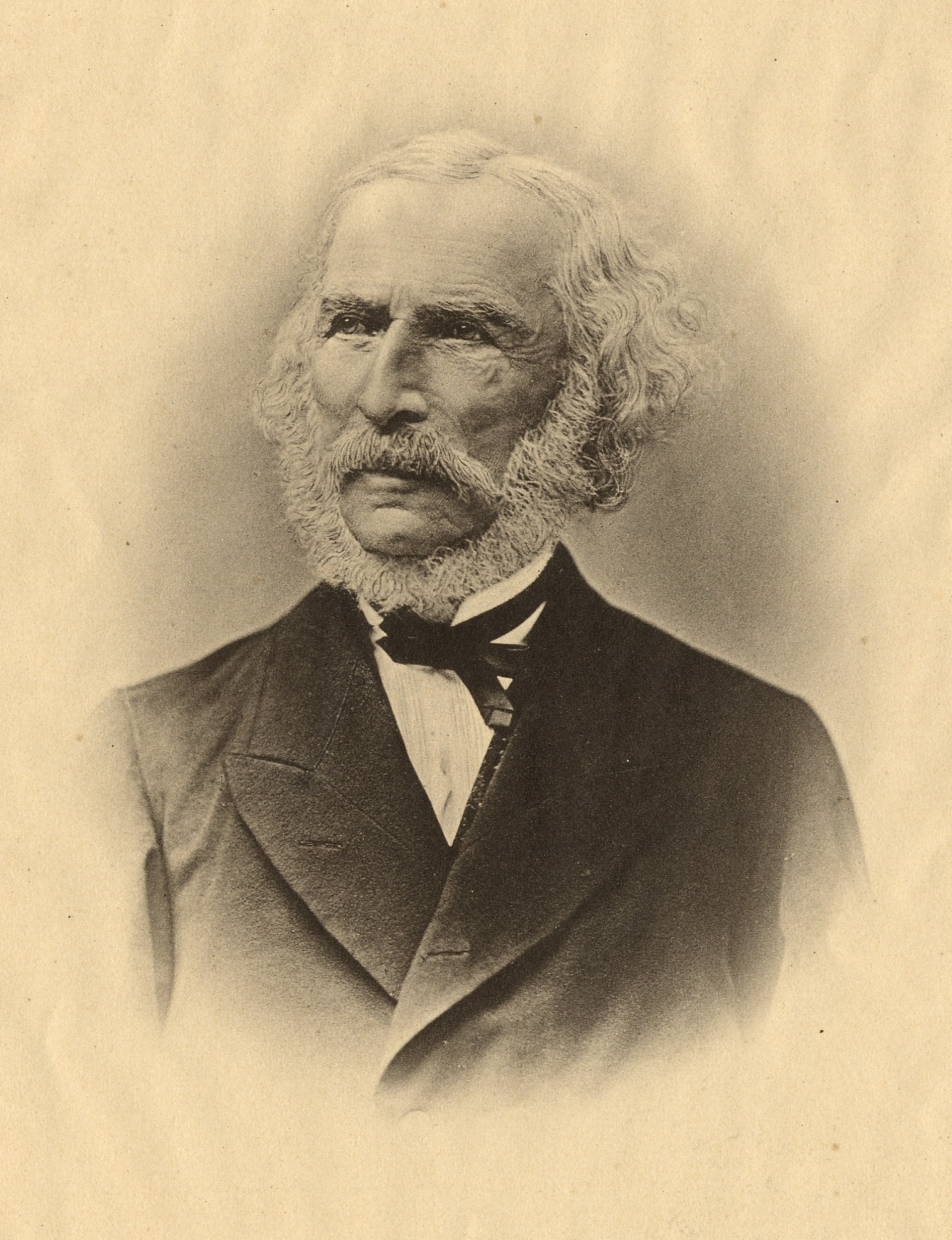
Richard La Nicca

Richard La Nicca (16 August 1794 in Safien-Neukirch – 27 August 1883 in Chur) was a Swiss engineer known as the pioneering planner and implementer of the Jura water correction project in the Swiss Jura.

Originating from Sarn and Chur, La Nicca was the son of Christian La Nicca, a pastor of Safien, Neukirch and Tenna, and Anna Gredig.

== Career ==
In 1809, La Nicca was at the Canton School in Chur. He served as a lieutenant in the Swiss regiment of Victor Emanuel I. in Piedmont.

From 1816 until 1818, he was student of technical sciences at the University of Tübingen.

From 1818 to 1821, he was Assistant to Giulio L. Pocobellis in the construction of the “Kommerzialstrasse” on the San Bernardino and in this function and others involved in the construction of the important "Ponte Vittorio Emanuele", south of the pass. Under his leadership, a new road was constructed at the Viamala with a tunnel and gallery which avoided the ascent over the Rongeller Höhe. The three existing bridges were incorporated in the road, with a new route cut through the rock in between.

After studying from 1822 to 1823 a year at the Ludwig-Maximilians-Universität München, he became in 1823 the first Canton of Graubünden chief engineer, a position he held until 1853. During those years he supervised the construction of important pass roads in Graubünden (Julier, Maloja, Bernina), and the rebuilding of settlements totally destroyed by natural catastrophes (Neu-Felsberg), as from 1843) or village fires (Thusis-Neudorf), as from 1845).

In 1826, he worked on the project of the Rhine correction in Domleschg valley (finalized in 1832). As from 1831 he signed as the director of the building of St. Luzisteig fortifications, responsible for statics and strengthening.

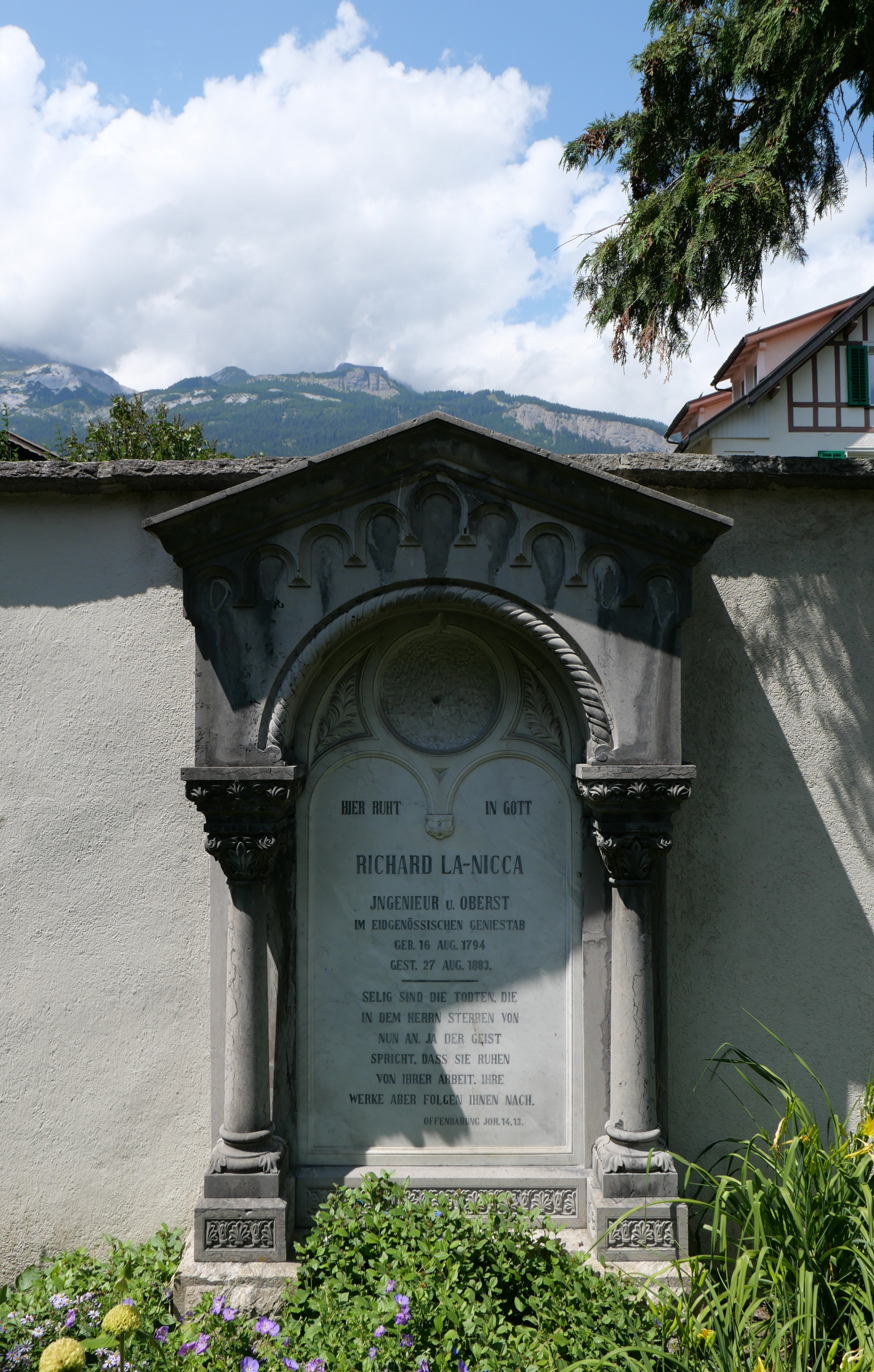
La-Nicca's grave at the Daleu cemetery in Chur.

In 1837, he was a co-founder of the Swiss Engineers and Architects Association.

In 1839, he designed the first project for a railway line on the Splügenpass;

In 1845, he involved himself in Alpine rail planning for the lower Lukmanier.

From 1840 to 1863, he served as engineer on the Linth Commission,

From 1840 to 1842, he projected the 1st Jura water correction (finalised 1868–91).

In 1847, he participated in the Sonderbund War as a military chief engineer in Canton Ticino, and then as Federal Colonel in the Génie troops.

In 1853, he was the technical director of the Südostbahn Rorschach-Chur.

From 1858 to 1871, he unsuccessfully urged a merger of railroad companies to form a railway line from Fluelen to Disentis and from Chur to Disentis through the Lukmanier, as an alternative to the Gotthard line.
