= San Bernardino, Switzerland =

Village in Switzerland

Coordinates: 46°27′N 9°12′E

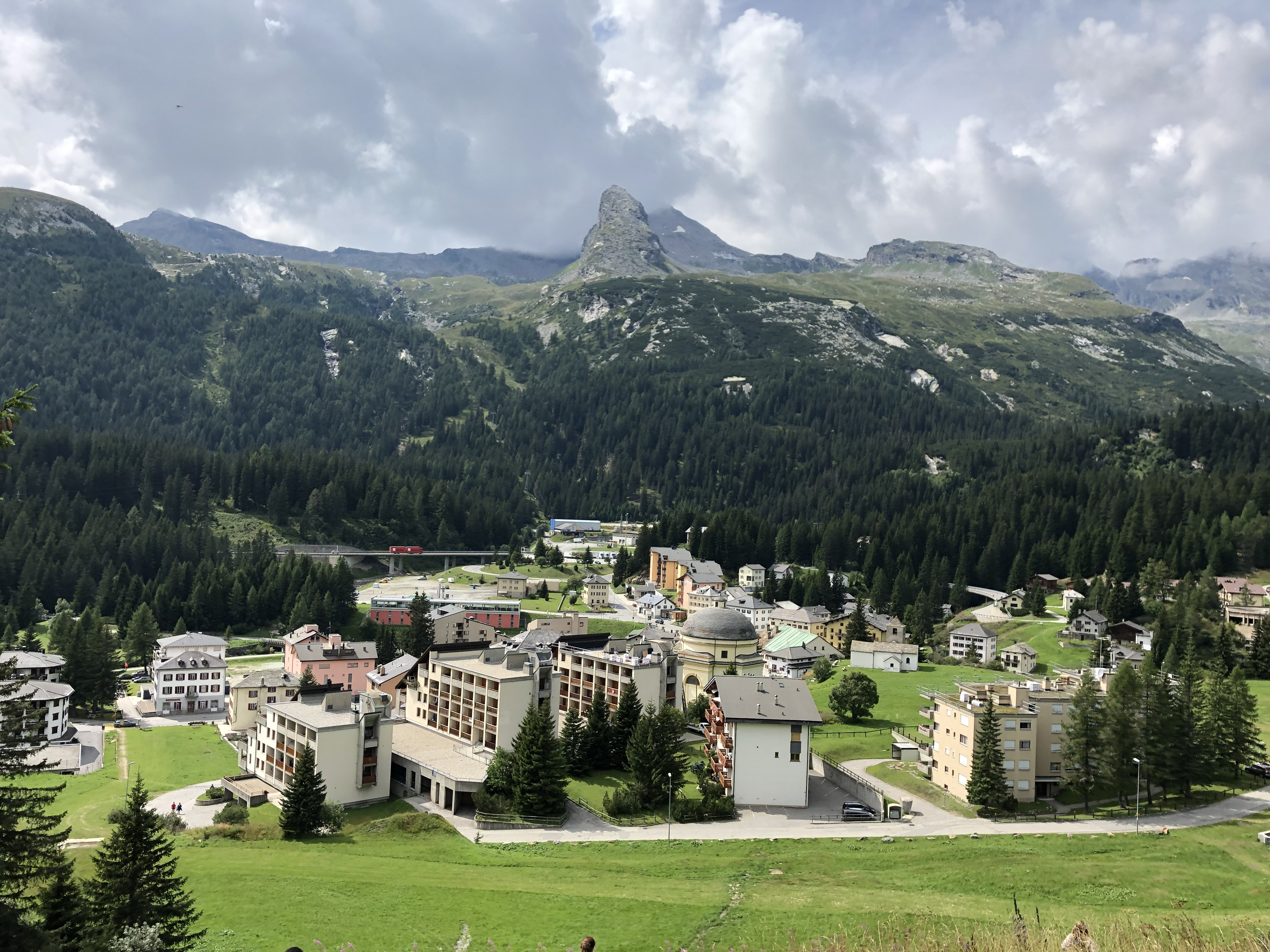
San Bernardino in 2019

San Bernardino is a mountainous village in the canton of Grisons in Switzerland. It is the southern entry point to the San Bernardino tunnel, which complemented the road over the San Bernardino Pass in 1967, opening a new all-year-round road to crossing the Alps.

The village is part of the municipality of Mesocco. The language spoken is Italian, one of the three official languages in the canton of Graubünden.

The church dates from around 1450, only years before the Viamala gorge bridge was opened for traffic, multiplying traffic across the pass.

== Transport ==
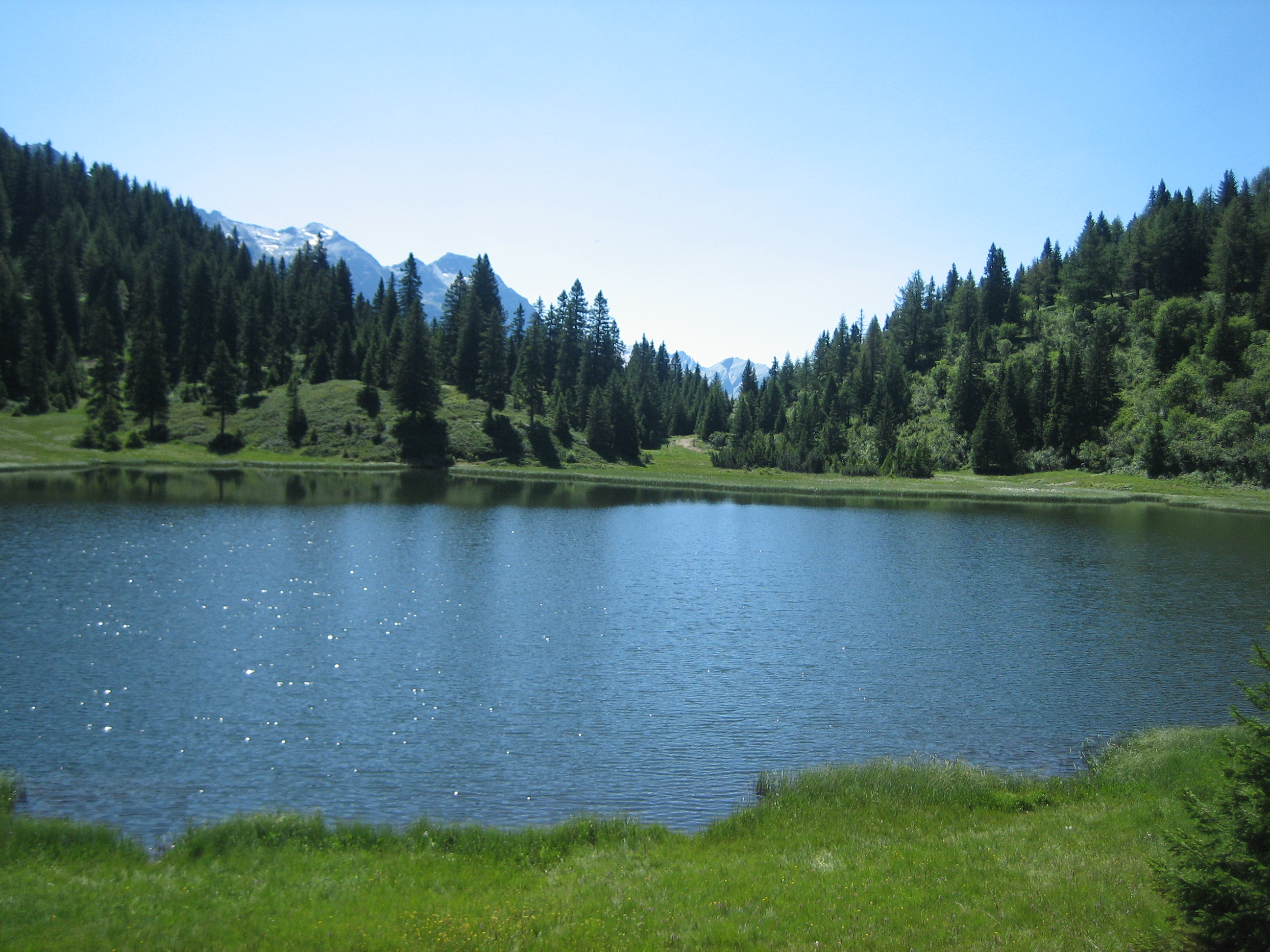
Lagh Doss in 2008

The old Mulattiera is still visible and in good condition, which was the path for horses before the construction of a road in 1770 by the adjacent municipalities. In 1812 the canton of Graubünden built a new road that is the one currently used as a local route and to cross the pass, whereas the through tunnel traffic uses a newly built road that avoids serpentines to allow smoother flow of traffic.

The walls were built then as dry walls and were restored in 1995 because the road has still to work as a replacement for the tunnel if it has to be closed. The restoration was completed with a minimum amount of concrete reinforcements.

== Geography ==
Aerial view (1953)

Lagh Doss is located close to the village. The municipality encloses Val Curciusa, a valley lying north of Bocchetta di Curciusa and therefore emptying its waters towards the Rhine river and the North Sea instead of the Adriatic Sea as in most Italian spoken areas of the canton of Graubünden.

== Climate ==
Climate data for S. Bernardino, elevation 1,639 m (5,377 ft), (1991–2020)
Month	Jan	Feb	Mar	Apr	May	Jun	Jul	Aug	Sep	Oct	Nov	Dec	Year
Mean daily maximum °C (°F)	0.7 (33.3)	1.0 (33.8)	3.7 (38.7)	6.8 (44.2)	11.5 (52.7)	15.9 (60.6)	18.2 (64.8)	17.8 (64.0)	13.4 (56.1)	9.2 (48.6)	4.1 (39.4)	1.3 (34.3)	8.6 (47.5)
Daily mean °C (°F)	−3.4 (25.9)	−3.1 (26.4)	−0.3 (31.5)	2.7 (36.9)	7.0 (44.6)	11.2 (52.2)	13.2 (55.8)	12.9 (55.2)	9.0 (48.2)	5.0 (41.0)	0.4 (32.7)	−2.6 (27.3)	4.3 (39.7)
Mean daily minimum °C (°F)	−7.3 (18.9)	−7.1 (19.2)	−4.2 (24.4)	−1.1 (30.0)	2.9 (37.2)	6.7 (44.1)	8.6 (47.5)	8.6 (47.5)	5.1 (41.2)	1.4 (34.5)	−2.7 (27.1)	−6.1 (21.0)	0.4 (32.7)
Average precipitation mm (inches)	77.1 (3.04)	60.2 (2.37)	80.8 (3.18)	133.2 (5.24)	167.7 (6.60)	171.5 (6.75)	159.3 (6.27)	186.9 (7.36)	162.4 (6.39)	180.8 (7.12)	168.5 (6.63)	88.3 (3.48)	1,636.7 (64.44)
Average snowfall cm (inches)	99.6 (39.2)	82.4 (32.4)	76.9 (30.3)	91.7 (36.1)	13.6 (5.4)	0.5 (0.2)	0.0 (0.0)	0.0 (0.0)	1.4 (0.6)	9.9 (3.9)	68.8 (27.1)	91.4 (36.0)	536.2 (211.1)
Average precipitation days (≥ 1.0 mm)	7.6	6.5	8.1	10.1	14.1	12.5	12.0	12.7	10.0	11.1	10.7	8.5	123.9
Average snowy days (≥ 1.0 cm)	8.7	7.7	7.8	7.8	1.8	0.1	0.0	0.0	0.2	1.6	7.0	8.9	51.6
Average relative humidity (%)	66	63	66	71	73	72	72	75	77	77	74	68	71
Mean monthly sunshine hours	96.6	107.3	140.7	128.1	127.6	144.6	162.7	154.0	133.5	108.7	80.9	85.6	1,470.3
Percentage possible sunshine	54	56	52	44	40	44	49	50	49	48	45	51	48
Source 1: NOAA
Source 2: MeteoSwiss (snow 1981–2010)
