= Lagh Doss =

Lake in Switzerland

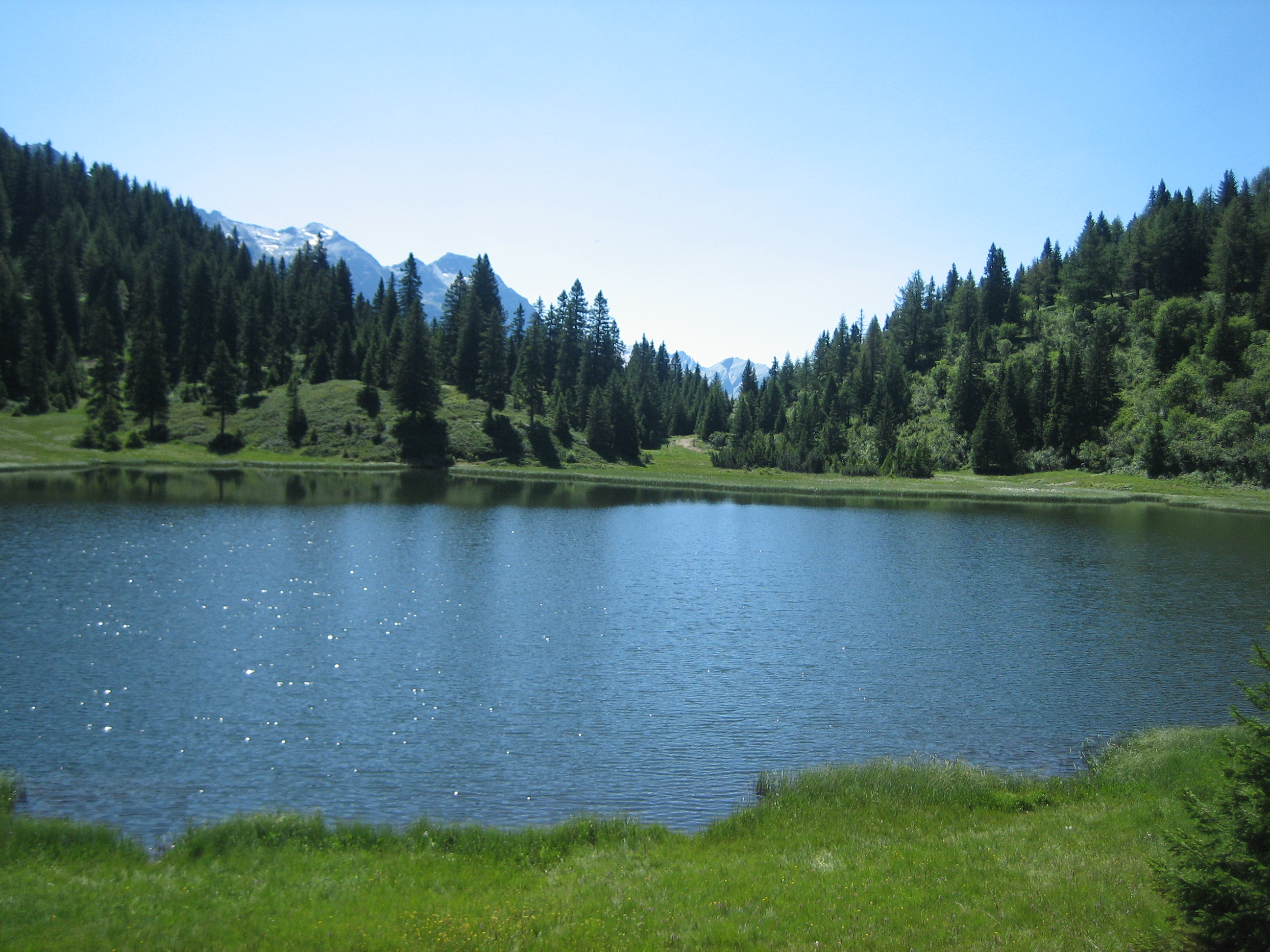

- Location within Canton of Graubünden Location within Switzerland Location within Italy Location within Alps
- Interactive map of Lagh Doss
- Location: Mesocco, Val Mesolcina, Grisons
- Coordinates: 46°26′57″N 9°12′17″E
- Basin countries: Switzerland
- Surface elevation: 1,652 m (5,420 ft)

Lagh Doss (also known as Lago d'Osso) is a lake at San Bernardino in the Val Mesolcina of the Grisons, Switzerland. It is located at an elevation of 1652 m. The site is listed in the Federal Inventory of Raised and Transitional Bogs of National Importance.
