= Alfred Mailick =

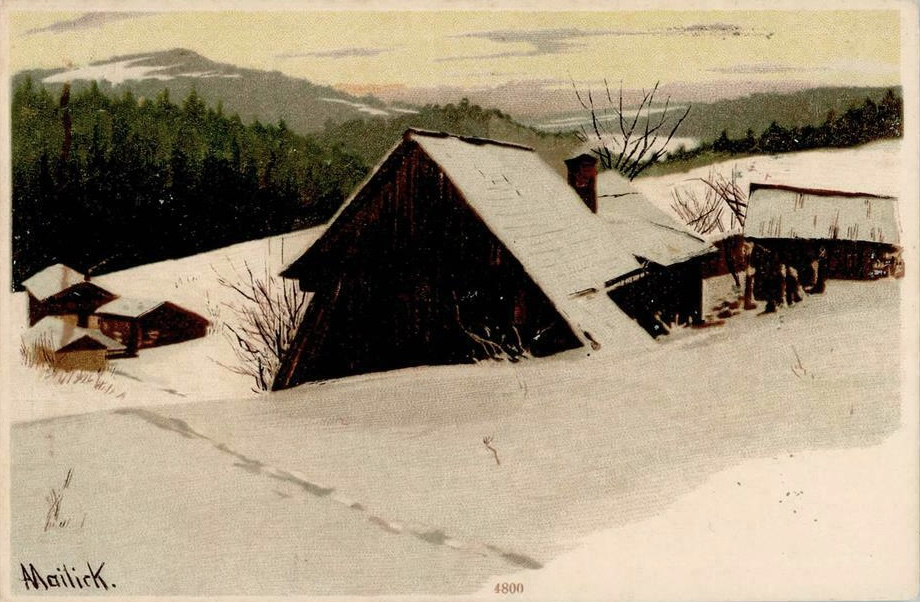
Mailick, Landscape under snow, 1902

Alfred Moritz Mailick (1869–1946) was a German artist and book-illustrator. He always signed his work Mailick, but in his private life until 1906 he used the spelling Meilick, with the same pronunciation.

== Life ==
Born in 1869 in Dresden, Mailick trained at the Dresden Academy of Fine Arts and became a successful artist and book illustrator, working in a romantic style inspired by the world of nature.

In 1896, Mailick illustrated Peter Rosegger's book Der Waldvogel, and in 1898 his Der Waldjugend. A reviewer said of this “Alfred Mailick has provided a wealth of charming pictorial illustrations for this Rosegger book.”

From about 1900, much of Mailick's work was published as postcards printed in colour. He married Rosa Niedermeyer from Bavaria, and their daughter Erika was born in 1902. In the same year, he built a large house, with an artist's studio for himself, on the Bahnhofstraße in Moritzburg, Saxony, designed by Richard Riemerschmid. In 1922, this was sold and the family moved into rooms at Berbisdorf Moated Castle in Radeburg.

One of Mailick's two sons, Erik Mailick (d), followed in his father's footsteps and was also a successful artist.

Mailick died in 1946 in Moritzburg, which was then in the post-war Soviet occupation zone.

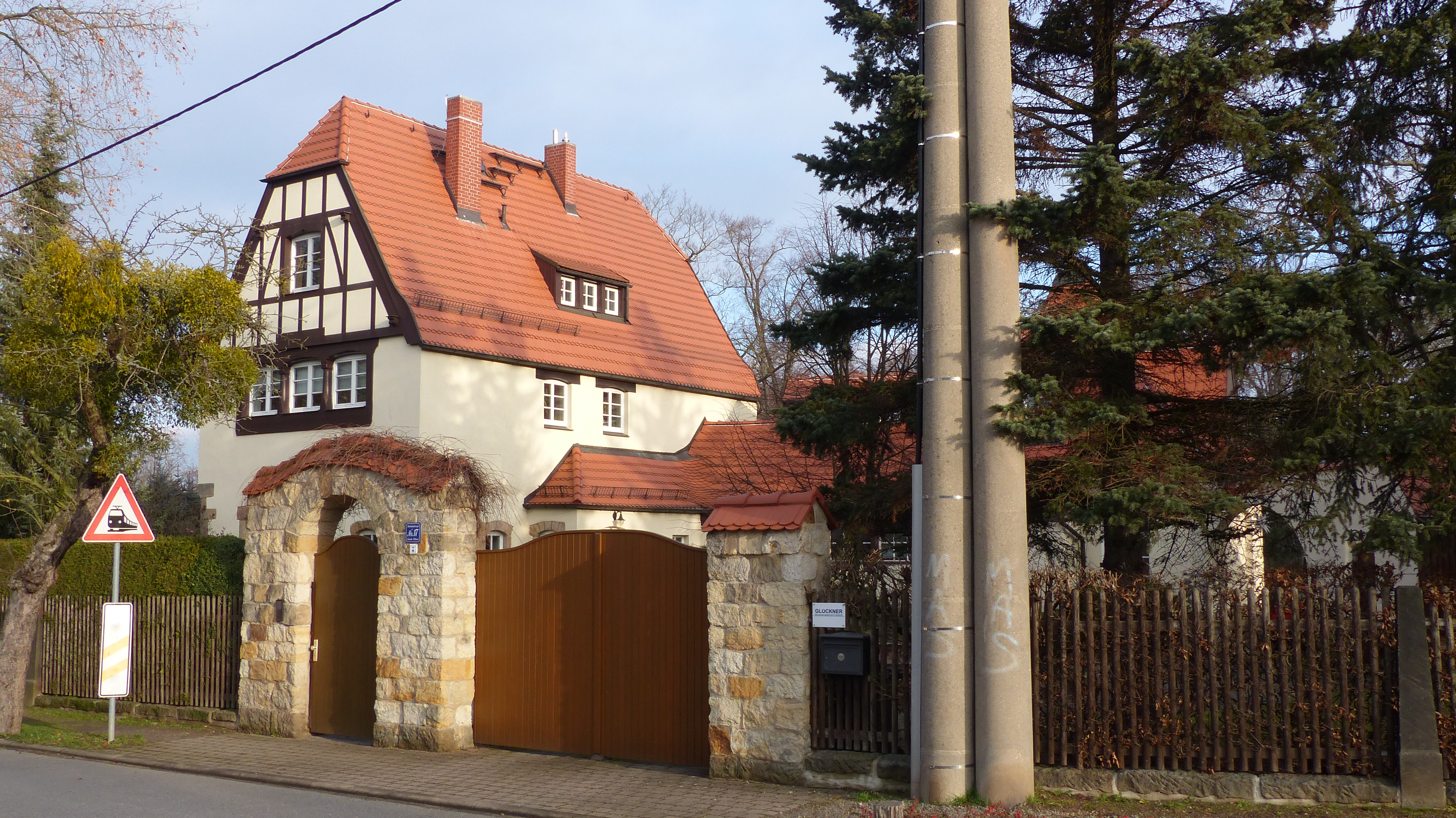
House built for Mailick in Moritzburg

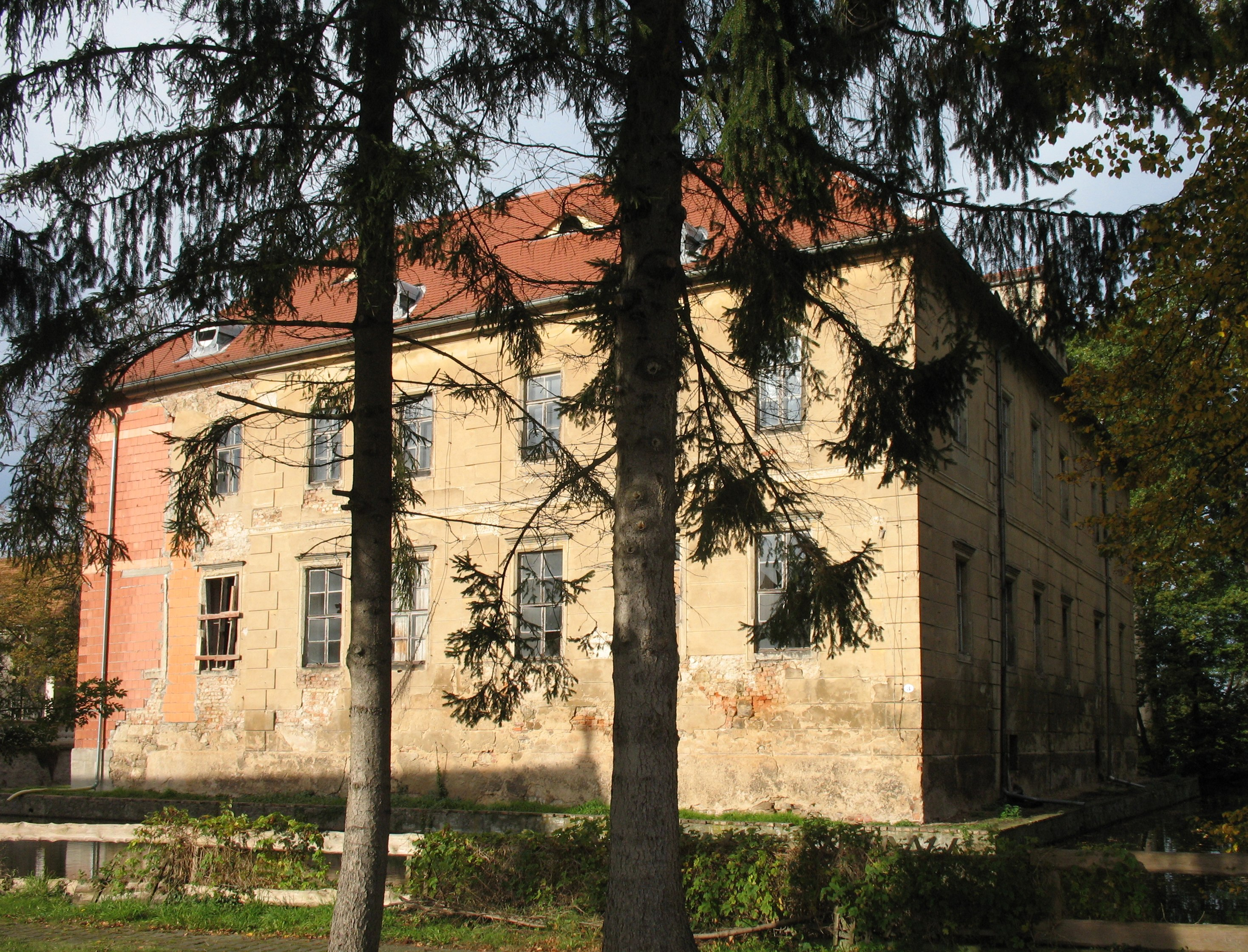
Mailick's later home, the Berbisdorf Moated Castle

== Work ==
At the Haus Lawaczeck Museum in Nieukerk, Kerken, North Rhine-Westphalia, one room exhibits a collection of work by Mailick with a hunting theme.

== Gallery ==
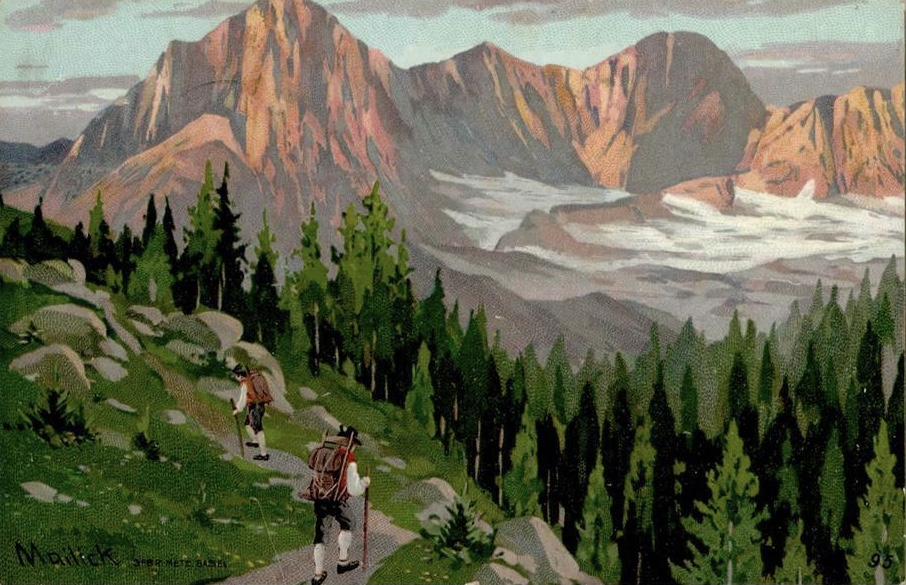
Mountaineers

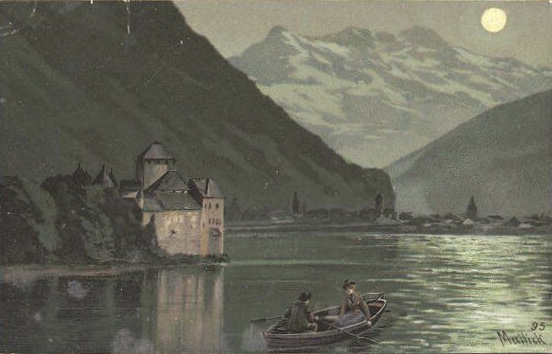
Rowing by Moonlight

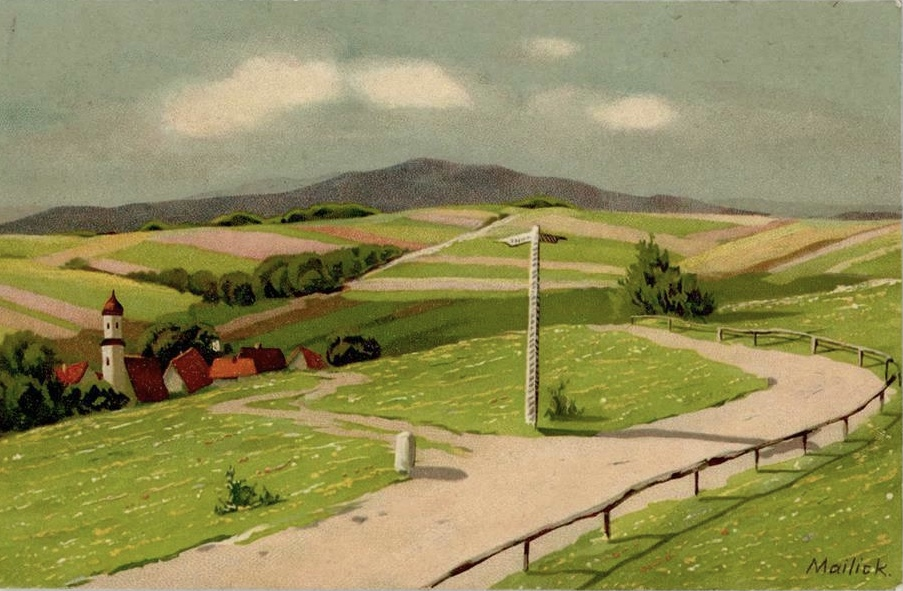
In a Sunny Meadow

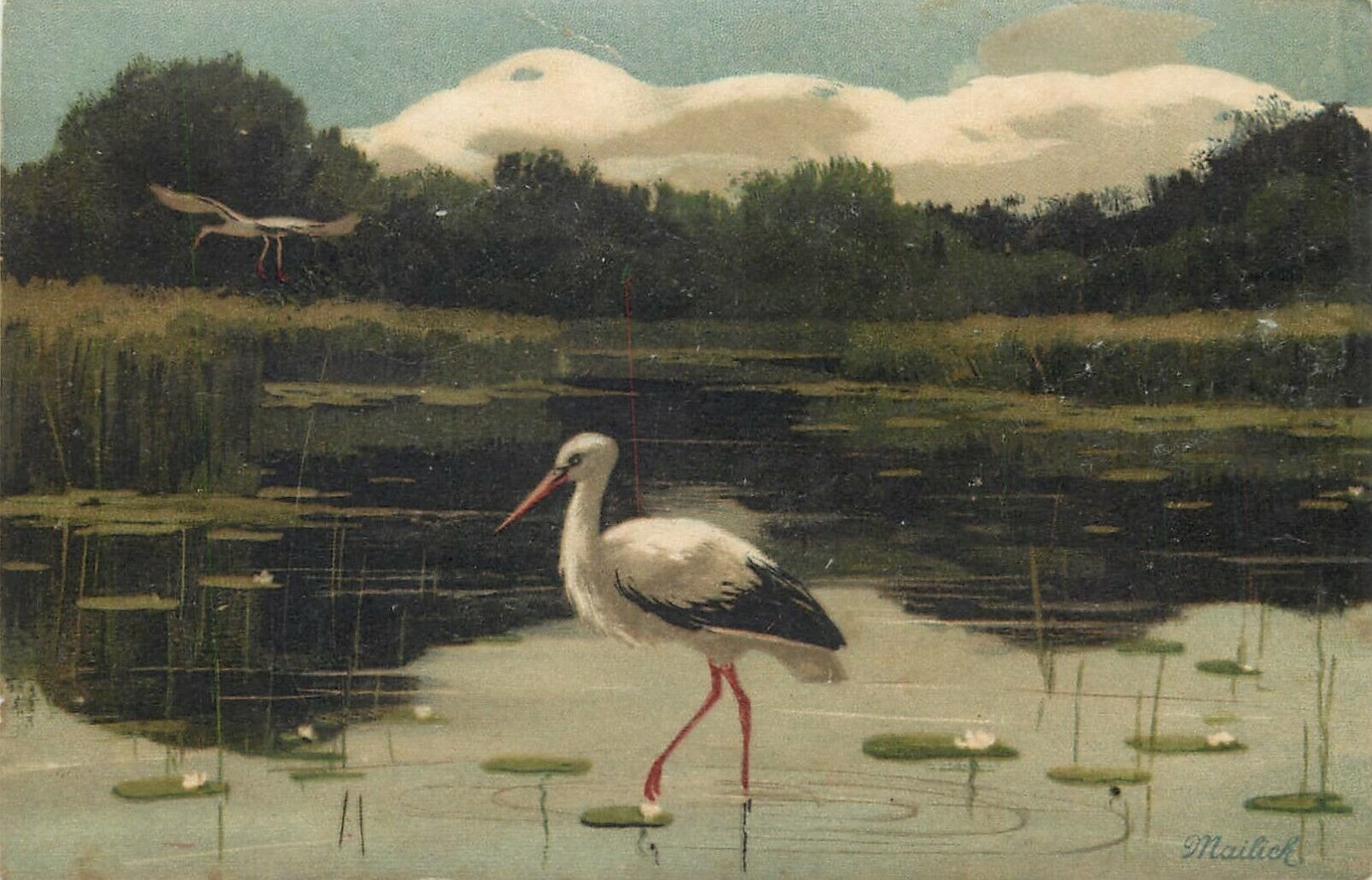
Stork

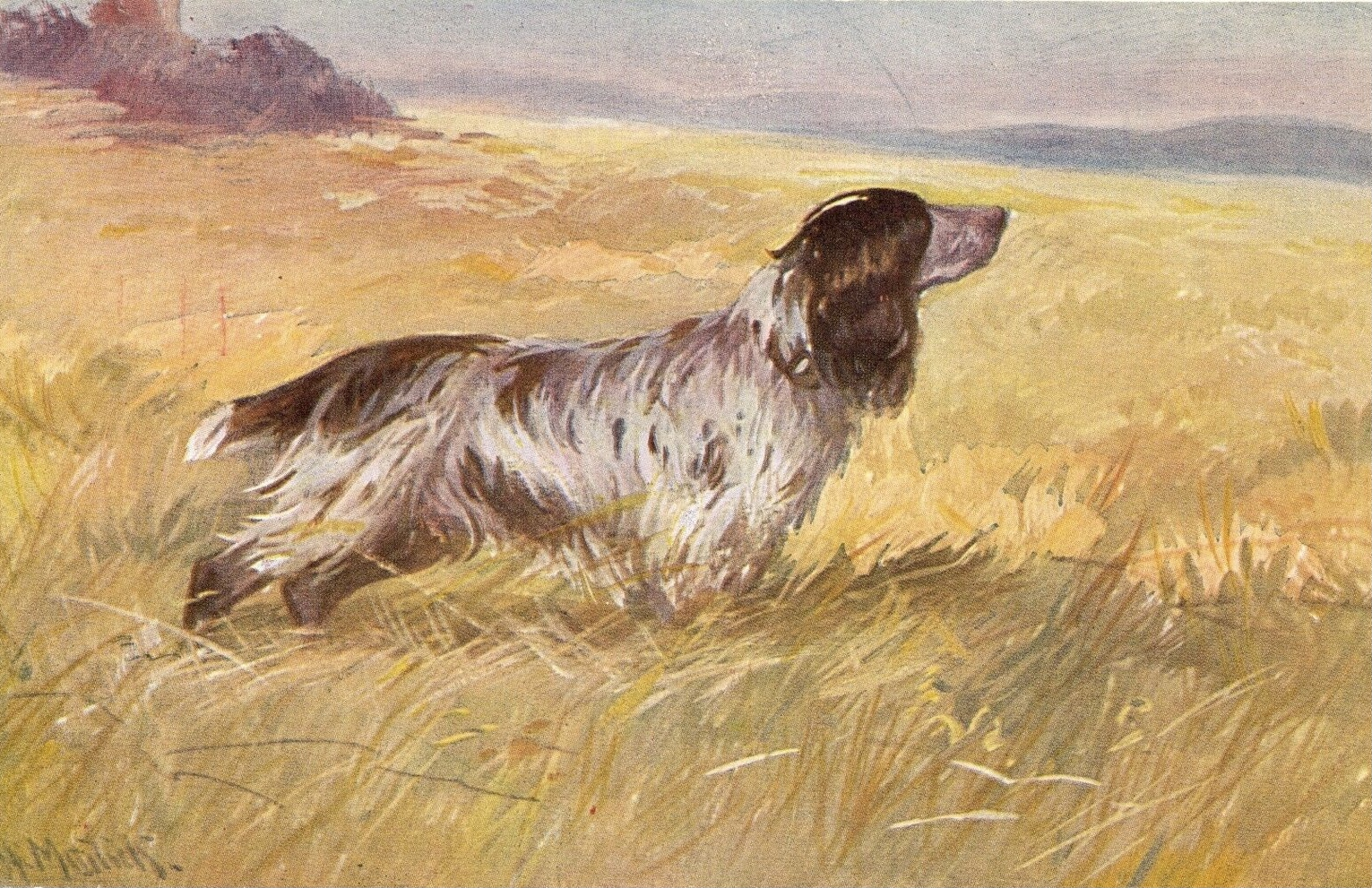
Spaniel

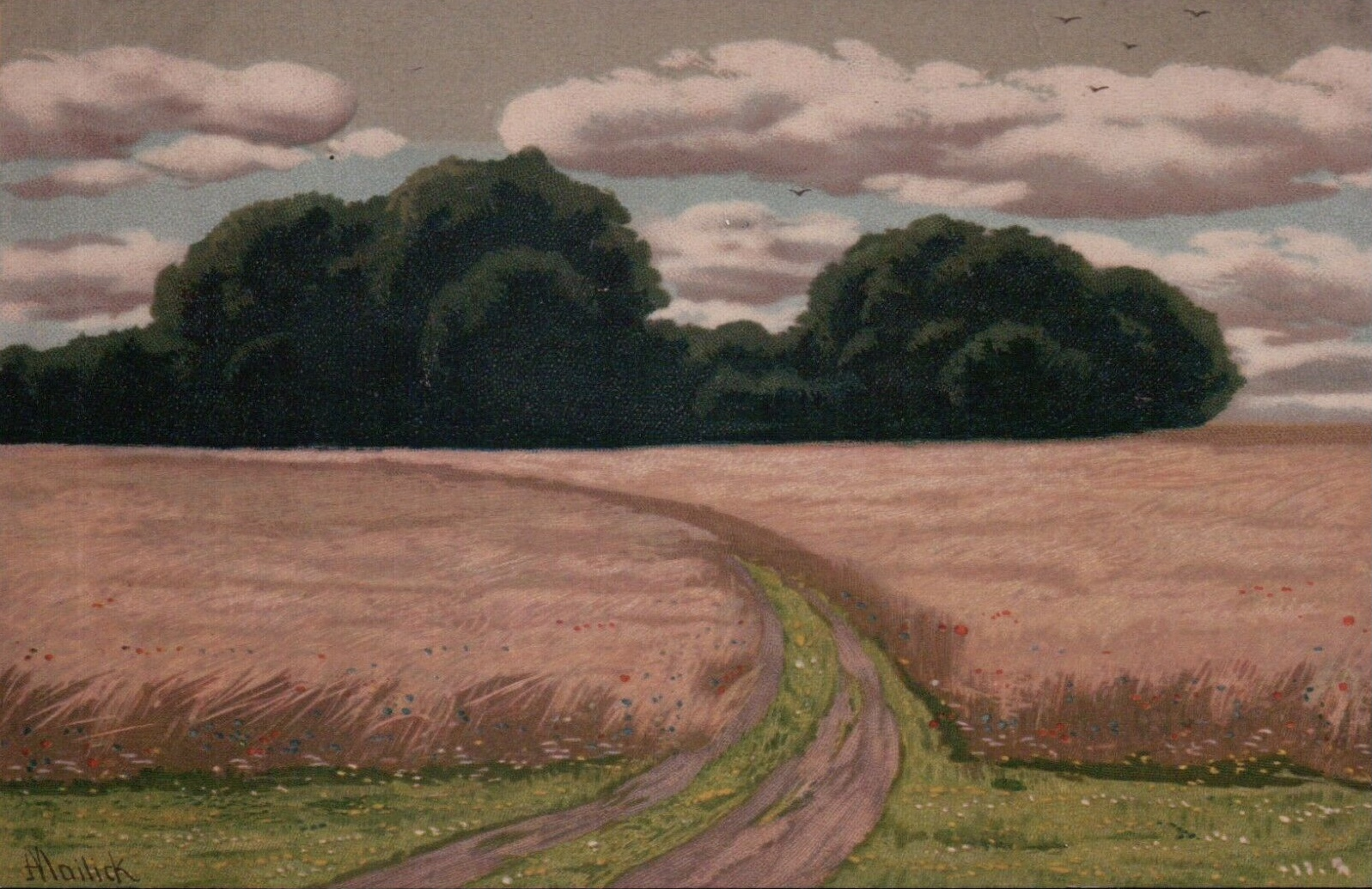
Cornfield

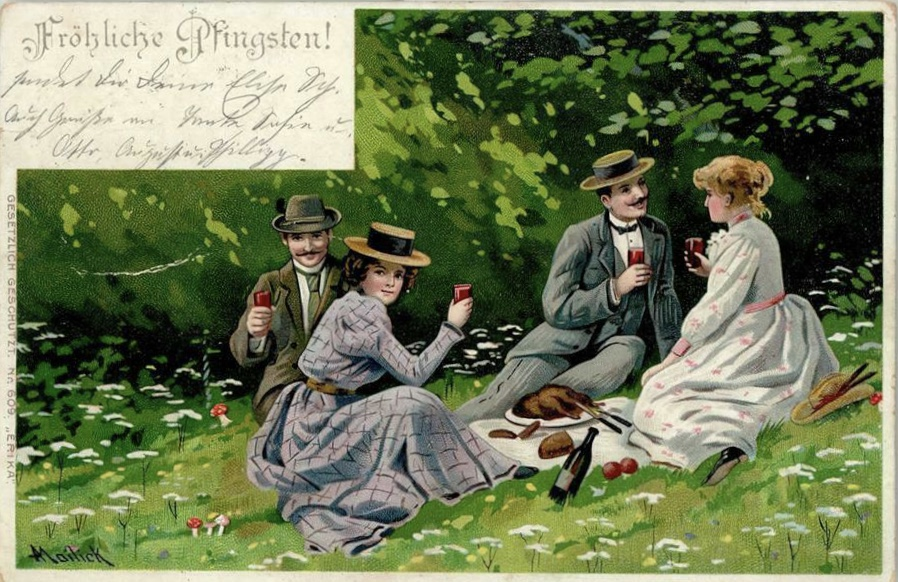
Whitsun postcard

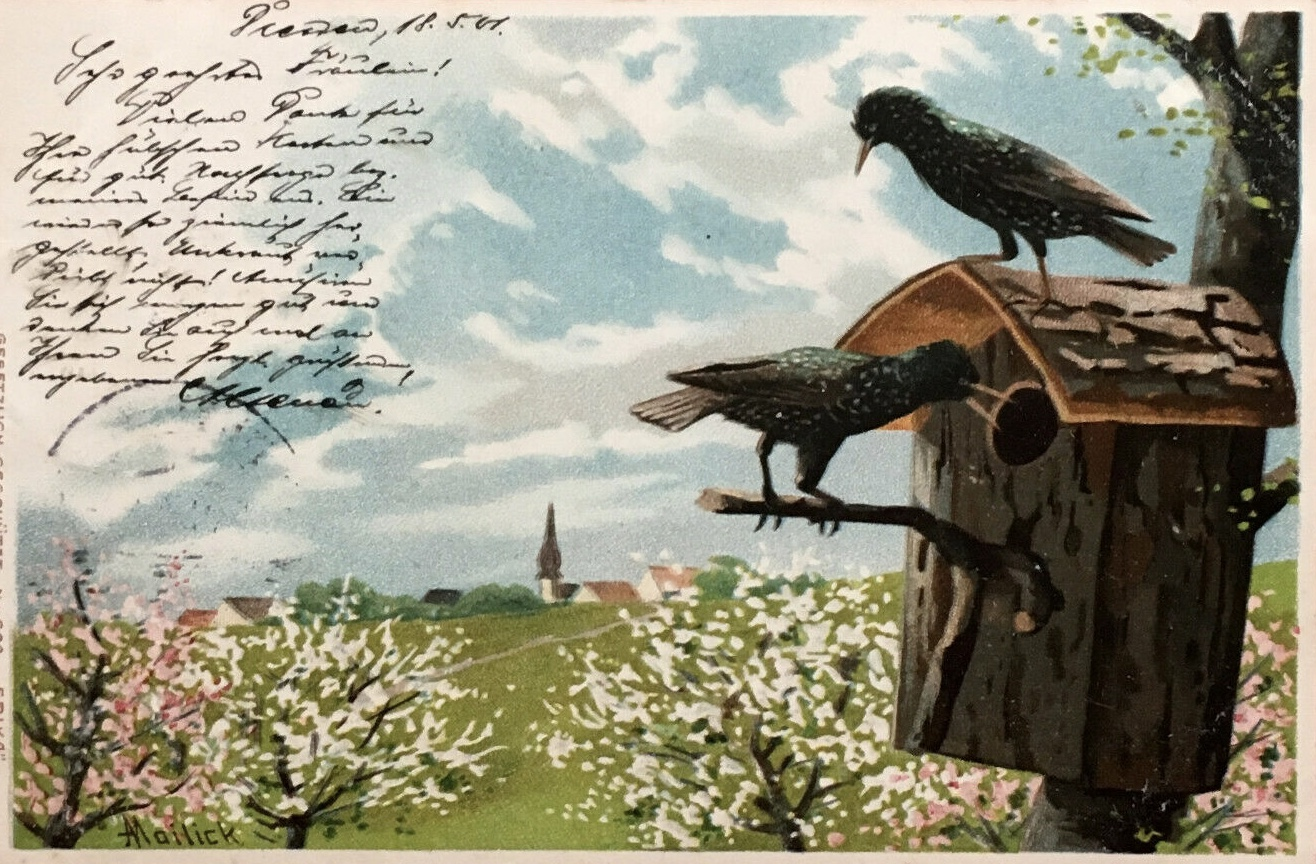
Bird box in Spring postcard

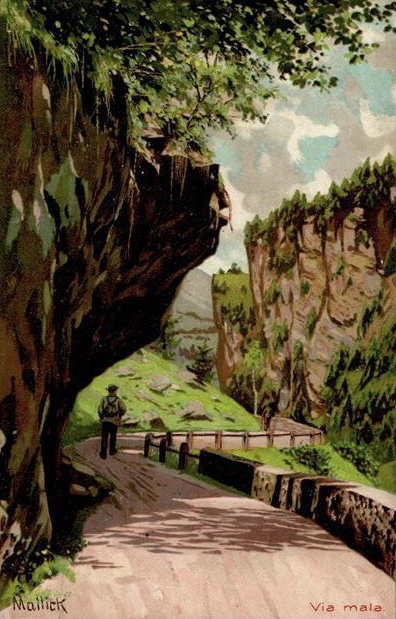
Via Mala

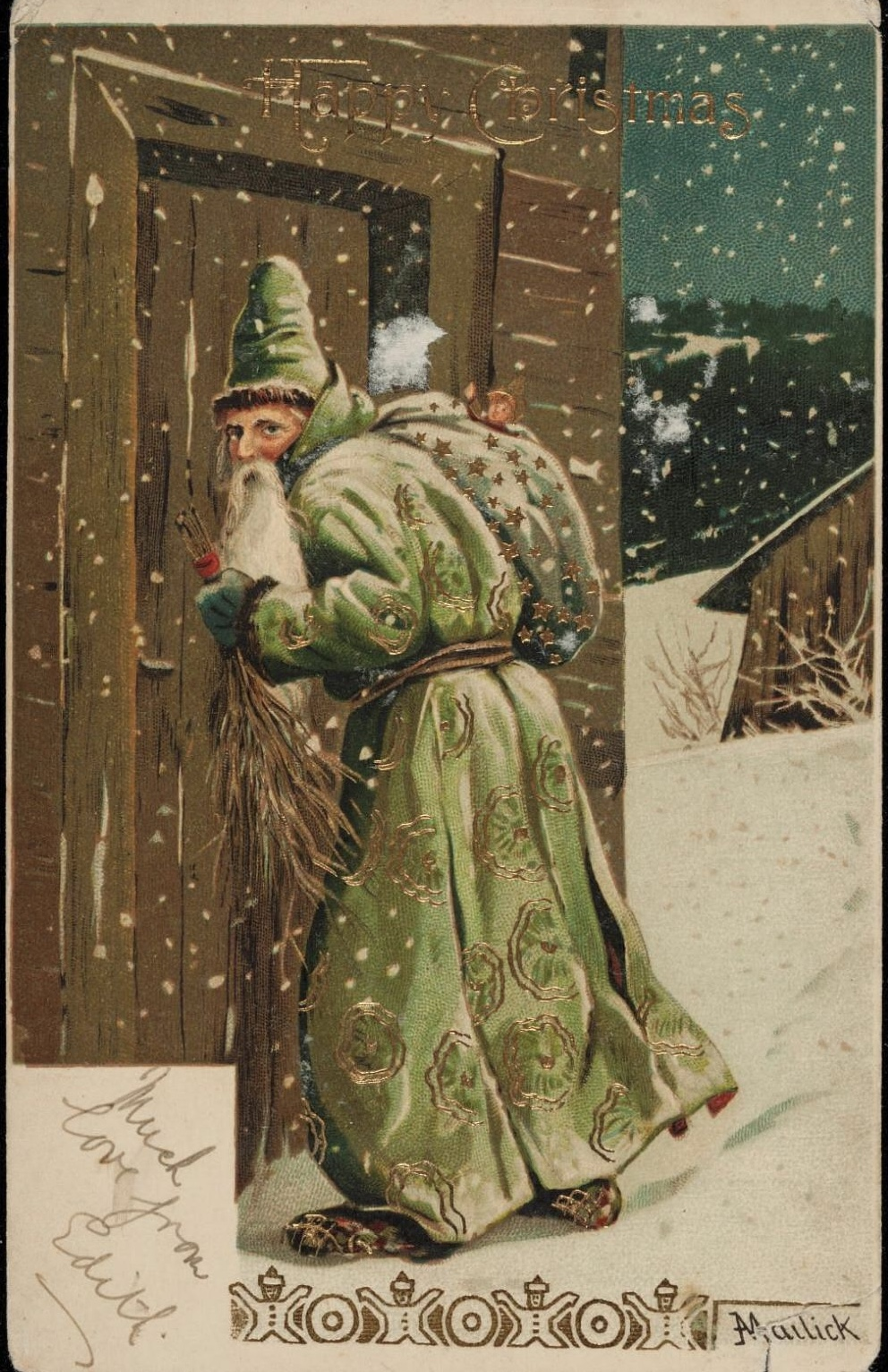
Happy Christmas postcard
