= Jura water correction =

19th century water rerouting project in Switzerland

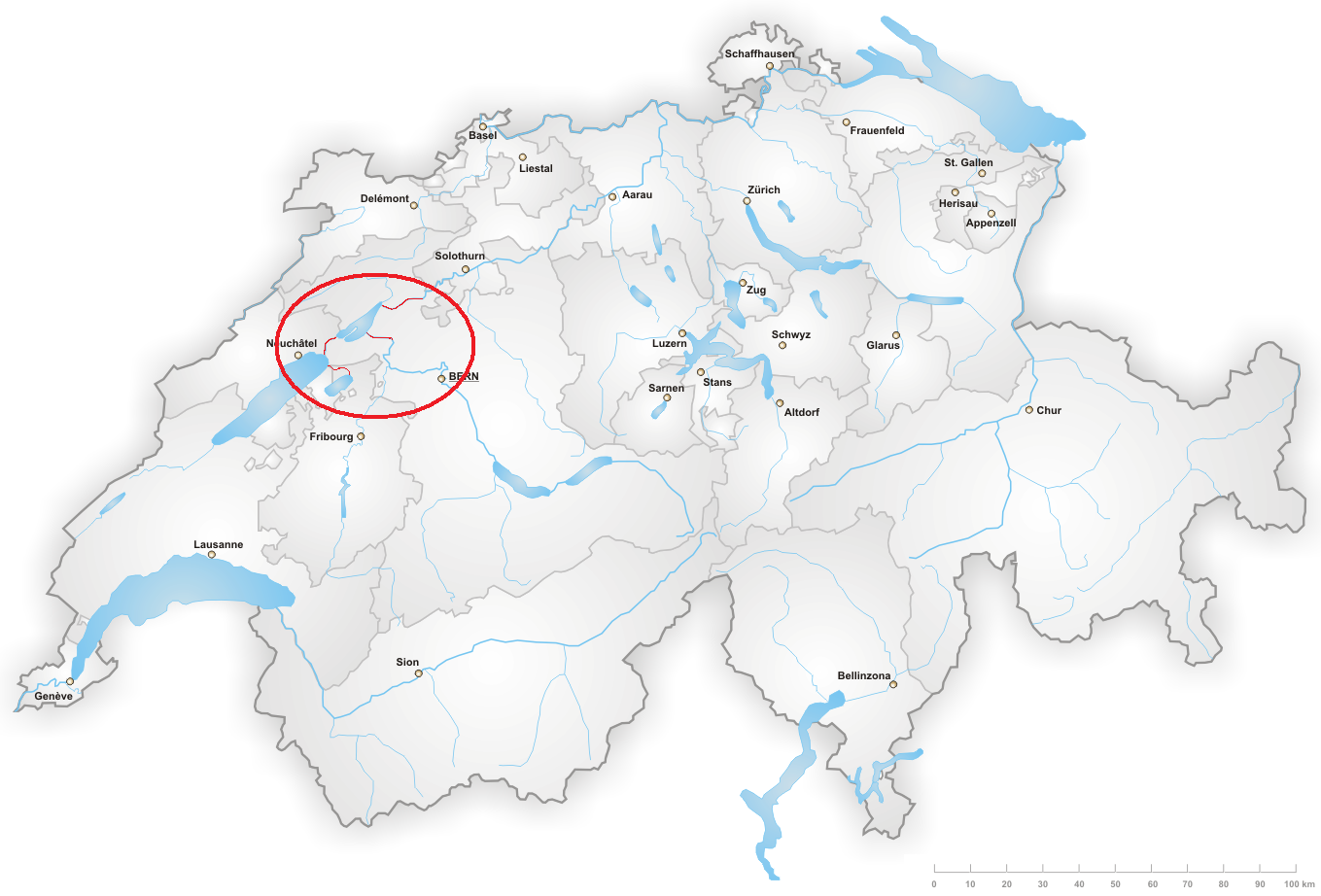
Area of Jura water correction.

The correction of the waters of the Swiss Jura consisted of a wide series of hydrological undertakings carried out in Switzerland in the region of the three lakes: Lake Murten connected to Lake Neuchatel by the Broye Canal, the latter connected to Lake Biel by the Thielle Canal, an area called the "Seeland”.

The correction has helped regulate the hydrology. It limits the risk of flooding, particularly in the areas covered by the Aare. It has also added vast areas of valuable agricultural land through the drying out and subsequent sanitization and improvement of the swamps which used to lie between these three lakes.

Many rivers have been corrected in Switzerland, for example the Rhône, which has undergone several adjustments between the 19th century and present day. However, the realignments in the Swiss Seeland are still the largest hydrological development in Switzerland.

At the foot of the Jura Mountains the region of the three lakes (Swiss Seeland) is part of the Rhine watershed. Each river of the region flows into the Aare, which is a tributary of the Rhine.

Before the works started in 1868, the Aare did not flow into Lake Bienne, but divided into several branches after the city of Aarberg, to join the Thielle, which flows into and out of Lake Bienne, near Büren an der Aare. Depending on weather and water conditions, the alluvial deposits and debris carried by the current would form banks damming the course of the Aare, resulting in rising waters upstream and unavoidable flooding, affecting the economic health of the whole area.

The area affected by the correction extends for about 100 km between La Sarraz and Luterbach, currently impacting the cantons of Vaud, Fribourg, Neuchatel, Solothurn, Berne and Jura.

== History ==
Archaeological research has shown that since the Bronze Age, the level of the three lakes and rivers rose several meters, and was already a threat to the population in 1500. As from the 15th century, chronicles have recorded regular floods in those areas as well as floods in the swamps in the “Grand Marais” of the Seeland area. On occasion, the level of the three lakes even rose to the point of spreading out into a single body of water. In 1651, the Aare overflowed upstream of Solothurn and formed a "lake of Solothurn", spreading from the City and merging with the three combined lakes. According to Schneider, this marked the historic flood peak.

All these floods had many consequences on the local population. From the second half of the 16th century, when the first complaints are recorded, the loss of crops and the high risk of epidemics of malaria caused people to abandon their villages. It is significant that the first proponent of the correction of the Jura Waters was Johann Rudolf Schneider, a doctor of medicine by profession.

During the 18th and 19th centuries, increased flooding which affected the whole of Switzerland worsened the situation, forcing the authorities to take action. Several projects were initiated and actions taken, in particular the removal of various structures along the course of the Thielle to Brügg in 1674.

In 1707, a map of the river Thielle from Lake Biel to its junction with the Aare was compiled and drawn by Samuel Bodmer, a lieutenant of artillery and Bernese Surveyor. In this publication, he proposed reducing the length of the course of the river by cutting through a meander.

In 1749, first officer Antoni Benjamin Tillier, hired by the federal government to deal with the management of rivers, started deepening the bed of the Thielle from Nidau to Brügg by excavation.

Thereupon, two consecutive floods in 1831 and 1832 resulted in the creation of a referendum committee in Nidau.

In the mid-1830s, the committee chaired by Johann Rudolf Schneider worked on a proposal to the diversion of the Aare into Lake Bienne. In 1840, the Chief Engineer of the canton of Grisons, Richard La Nicca, was commissioned to study and execute the project.

=== Richard La Nicca's Project ===
Two years later, in 1842, Richard La Nicca, submitted his report with detailed proposals for the correction to the Government.

It called for the implementation of various works, namely

- the diversion of the Aare from Aarberg directly into Lake Bienne, through an excavated channel, called the "Hagneck Canal".
- correction of both Aare and Thielle at the outlet of Lake Bienne by an excavated channel from Nidau to Büren;
- correction of the Broye between the lakes of Murten and Neuchatel (the Broye Canal);
- correction of the Thielle between the lakes of Neuchatel and Bienne (the Thielle Canal); correction of the Aare from Büren through the city of Solothurn as far as the confluence with the Emme.
- the reclaiming of the wetlands in the vast swamp called the "Grand Marais" and the surrounding areas between the three lakes.

His final project, which was to be implemented as the "First correction", was submitted to the authorities in 1852: the various operations were classified into three categories:

- Category 1: Cleaning up local rivers flowing out of the lakes, including the mouth of the Thielle, the Aare in Meienried and upstream of Büren-an-der-Aare;
- Category 2: Larger works on the Thielle and the Aare, to move the confluence of the Thielle and the Aare downstream and to make the level of Lake Bienne less dependent on the debris carried by the Aare;
- Category 3: Diverting the downstream course of the Aare from Aarberg either into Lake Bienne or Lake Neuchatel, in order to deposit its debris into a lake.

=== First correction (1868–1878) ===
A federal decree, issued in 1857, ordered Richard La Nicca's project to be carried out as a common undertaking between the Confederation and the cantons of Vaud, Neuchatel, Friburg, Berne and Solothurn. As a first step, only some of the works in the first category are to be undertaken. Heavier works (categories 2 and 3) were not yet feasible because of a lack of funding, political vision and technical expertise

This decision was accompanied by a credit of five million francs to complete the first stage. The work started in 1868, 28 years after the first debates of the Committee.

According to the Federal Decree of 1867, the Confederation was to supervise the work. However the authorities finally selected Richard and Nicci William Fraisse to supervise all work sites and report to the policy makers.

For the first works, two correction sites were identified: a "lower" and an "upper": the lower correction "includes the realignment of the Aare and its associated works around Lake Biel"; the upper "comprises the work upstream of Thielle" (Lakes Neuchatel and Murten). The lower correction was also called "the Bernese correction" because the works on the areas downstream of Büren were to be carried out entirely on Bernese territory.

==== “Bernese Correction” ====
The previous works on the diversion of the river Kander had clearly demonstrated the necessity of expanding and developing the river outflow from the lake before increasing the inflow entering it: the Kander had been diverted into the lake of Thun, without any prior modification to the outflow capacity of the Aare from the lake: accordingly this mistake caused severe flooding in Thun, a town on the Aare located at the very outlet of the lake. This episode has ever since been a well-remembered basic lesson in hydrology in Switzerland.

In the case of Lake Biel, the increased inflow that would be brought by the Aare was estimated to be 290%. Hence, the Bernese correction had to begin with the digging of a canal out of Lake Biel in Nidau, down to the city of Büren-an-der-Aare, with a minimal outflow capacity in accordance with the 290% estimate. Shortly after the start of work on this canal, as the level of Lake Biel decreased, work upstream from the lake began. In 1873, the excavation of the Hagneck Canal began. The main difficulty was crossing the Seerücken Hills, in a cutting 900 metres (3,000 ft) long and 34 metres (112 ft) in depth, which required the excavation of one million cubic metres of material. A vast network of small drainage channels was also widened to consolidate all the marshes between the lakes. These works were called "the internal correction".

==== Upper correction ====
These works consisted of modification of the rivers connecting the three lakes. The chief engineer was Henri Ladame from Neuchatel.

Work began in 1874 with the digging out of the Broye Canal connecting the lakes of Morat and Neuchatel. The Broye is a Swiss plateau river; it feeds the lake of Murten and flows out of it into the lake of Neuchatel, where it joins the Thielle, flowing out of the latter lake into Lake Biel. This canal is a development and correction of the previous course of the river between these two lakes.

In 1875, works began on the Thielle Canal linking the Lakes Neuchatel and Bienne. The Thielle is the river feeding lake Neuchatel, then joining Lake Biel.

Before these works, the Thielle was a tributary of the Aare, joining the Aare downstream of Lake Biel. After the works, the confluence takes place in Lake Biel. The waters of the Aare, the Thielle and the Suze (which drains most of the waters of the Bernese Jura), leave the lake through the Thielle Canal.

Both canals represent an enlargement and correction of the course of the previous rivers, leading to the removal of meanders and equalizing the levels of the three lakes.

==== Results and consequences ====
With the excavation of these four canals and the regulation of various dams, the water situation in the Seeland area has been improved. The median level of the three connected lakes has fallen by approximately 2.5 metres (8 ft 2 in) and they have become a unique reservoir operating on the principle of compensating bodies of water. The Aare now flows into Lake Biel.

All these changes have had different consequences on the shores of lakes and the marshy area between. The lakes have decreased in size: the lake of Neuchatel lost 23.7 km^{2} (9.2 sq mi), Lake of Biel, 3.3 km^{2} (1.3 sq mi) and Lake of Murten, 4.6 km^{2} (1.8 sq mi).

Various elements had to be adapted to the levels of the new lakes, including downsizing the steamboats and adapting the existing ports and docks.

The first correction of the Jura waters brought the desired effects and were considered to be a success. In Nidau, a monument was inaugurated in 1908 in honour of Johann Rudolf Schneider and Richard La Nicca with the inscription "To those who saved its great distress, in recognition: Seeland."

However, concerns arose, including the collapse of peat bogs following the oxidation of the peat newly exposed to the air by the falling water. Fortunately, upon proper reinstatement and management of the flat land between the three lakes over some decades, the whole former swamp has become a vast fertile area.

La Nicca had anticipated the need for the second correction of the Jura waters to consolidate the results of the first.

=== Commissioning of the regulating dam at Port in 1939 ===
During the first correction, a temporary dam had been built across the Nidau-Büren Canal in order to maintain the water level in Lake Bienne. Of insufficient retaining capacity, another one quickly replaced it in 1887. This also showed its limits, especially during a flood in 1910.

The cantons of Vaud, Neuchatel and Fribourg asked for its replacement, but it was only modified, in 1911 and 1915. Finally, the building of the new regulating dam was started in Port in 1936, and completed and commissioned in 1939. This dam ensures the level control of the three lakes, as well as the flow of the Aare. The three lakes act as a buffer zone absorbing the waters of the Aare in the event of any upstream flooding.

=== Second correction ===
The works on the second correction were lighter than the first. In part already envisaged by La Nicca, they took place between 1962 and 1973. They focused essentially on the construction of the Flumenthal dam.

The course of the Aare was again corrected between Büren and Flumenthal in order to remove the bar at the confluence with the Emme. The Broye, Thielle and Nidau-Büren Canals were widened and deepened; their banks were also re-designed in order to prevent damage in case of flooding.

The second correction has further reduced the variations of the level of the three lakes: on the one hand, the high water level has been adapted to the subsidence of the dried-out land and lowered by one meter; on the other hand, the low water level was increased by almost one metre, to facilitate inland navigation, fishery and landscaping.

The Aare is navigable between Bienne and Solothurn, with regular boat services.

Since the completion of the second correction, no major flooding occurred in Seeland until August 2007, which fortunately was lower than any of the previous floods.

== The Murgenthal Condition ==
The Murgenthal Condition stipulates that the flow of the Aare must not exceed 850 cubic metres per second (30,000 cu ft/s) at the gauging station at Murgenthal, which is located downstream of the confluence of the Aare and the Emme. When the Emme flow increases, the flow of the Aare downstream of their confluence also increases accordingly, which may cause flooding downstream in the cantons of Solothurn and of Aargau.

The Condition sets the flow that the Aare should not exceed: if the flow increases too much, then the dam at Port must limit the flow of the Aare from upstream, the three lakes being used to absorb the crest of the flood, until the Emme subsides.

== Situation in the early Twenty-First Century ==
The correction of the Jura waters has established a reliable system of water flow in the Aare. It has however shown its limits with the occurrence of the August 2007 floods. Indeed, the flow of the Aare rose to 1,260 cubic metres per second (44,000 cu ft/s) in Murgenthal and Lake Bienne exceeded its highest level limit by 540 millimetres (21 in), causing flooding around the lake as well as downstream Murgenthal.

== See also ==
- Correction of the Rhône upstream of Lake Geneva

== Other sources ==
- "150 Jahre Juragewässerkorrektion – 150 ans de la correction des eaux du Jura – 150 anni dalla correzione delle acque del Giura: un'impresa pionieristica" (official dossier) (in German, French, and Italian). Berne, Switzerland: Federal Office for the Environment. 14 October 2017.
- Matthias Nast, Terres du lac, l'histoire de la correction des eaux du Jura.
- "The floods of 2005 in Switzerland: Synthesis report on the event analysis" (PDF) (official report). Non-specialist publications (in German, French, Italian, and English). Berne, Switzerland: Federal Office for the Environment. 17 September 2008. DIV-7529-E.
- "Ereignisanalyse Hochwasser August 2007: Analyse der Meteo- und Abflussvorhersagen; vertiefte Analyse der Hochwasserregulierung der Jurarandgewässer" (PDF) (official report). Umwelt-Wissen (in German and French). Berne, Switzerland: Federal Office for the Environment. 8 January 2010. UW-0927-D.
