= San Bernardino Tunnel =

Tunnel in Switzerland

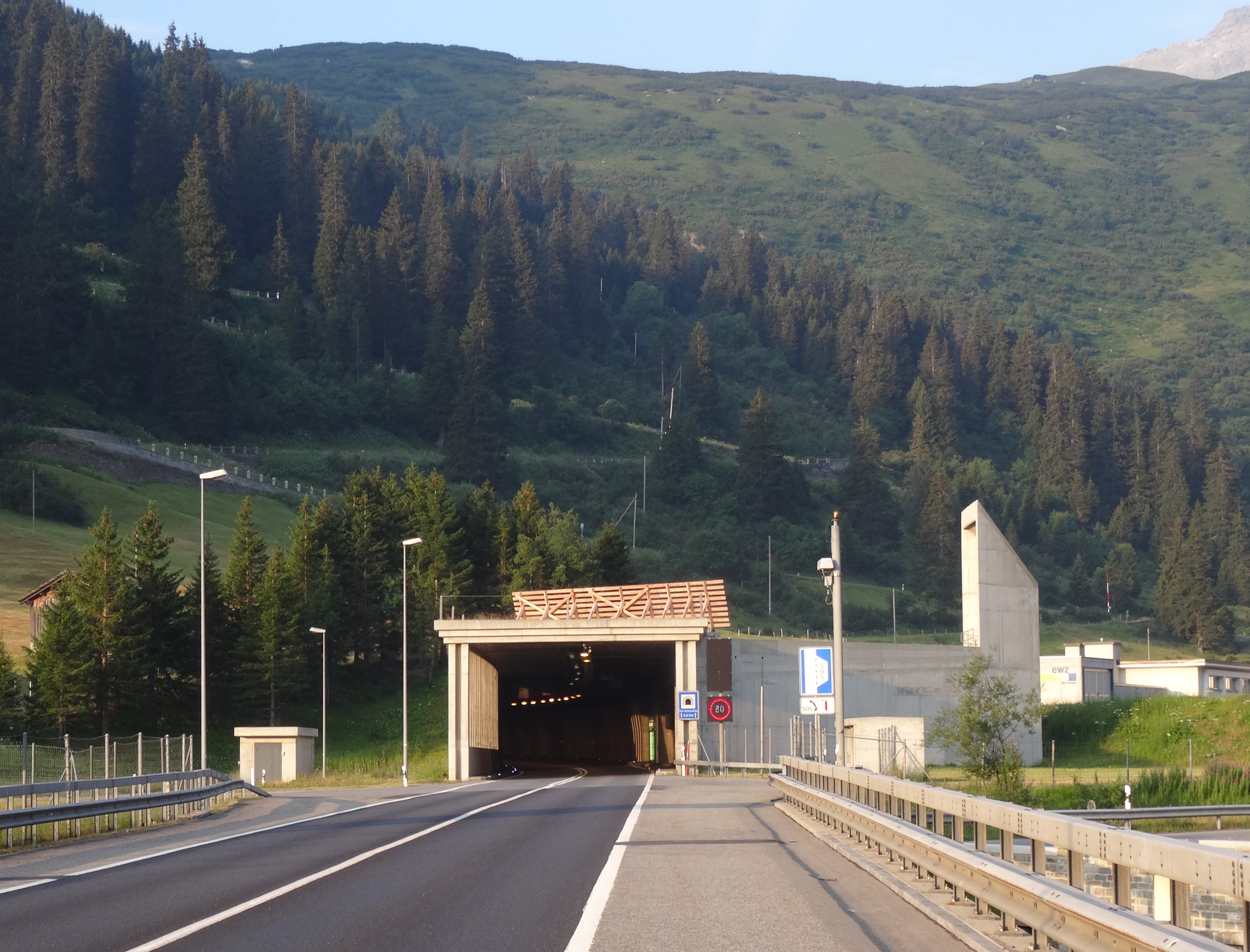
- Interactive map of San Bernardino Tunnel

Overview
- Location: Graubünden, Switzerland
- Coordinates: 46°29′49.20″N 9°10′19.20″E
- Status: Active
- Route: A13 motorway, European route E43
- Start: San Bernardino
- End: Hinterrhein

Operation
- Opened: 1967
- Character: road

Technical
- Length: 6,596 metres (21,640 ft)
- No. of lanes: 2

The San Bernardino road tunnel is a road tunnel in the canton of Graubünden in south-eastern Switzerland. It runs under the San Bernardino Pass between the town of San Bernardino and the town of Hinterrhein, and forms part of the A13 motorway and the European route E43. The tunnel was completed in 1967 and is 6,596 metres (21,640 ft) long. Since the opening of the tunnel, the Val Mesolcina, one of the Italian-speaking southern valleys of Graubünden, is now connected all-year round with the rest of the canton.

The San Bernardino Tunnel is part of the A13 as a single-carriageway freeway and therefore passes through one bore without a central physical structure. As there is only one lane per direction, overtaking (passing other vehicles) inside the tunnel is not permitted. The speed limit of 80 km/h (50 mph) is enforced by means of speed-check cameras. This road tunnel is considerably less prone to traffic jams than the St. Gotthard Tunnel.

The old name Vogelberg may refer to the migratory birds who pass by here every year in large flocks. These have now also discovered the tunnel as a "shortcut". Sometimes, the traffic must be stopped so that the birds find their way undisturbed.

== History ==
In 1967, the 6.6-kilometre (4.1 mi) long San Bernardino Tunnel was opened as part of the National Road N13 (today A13), between the villages of Hinterrhein and San Bernardino. The tunnel connected Eastern Switzerland with the Canton of Ticino, and is the second most important after the Gotthard Alpine crossing for freight and private transport in Switzerland. At the time of planning the current traffic density was not yet clear. From today's perspective, the roadway is very tight, and the ventilation systems did not meet modern requirements. Separate emergency escape tunnels did not exist. The San Bernardino route served the international area as an escape route to the A2 (particularly after the accidental, temporary closure of the Gotthard tunnel in 2001), although the road leading to the tunnel climbs to 8% and has tight bends, as well as a narrow tunnel unsuitable for heavy vehicles. A major refurbishment of the tunnel started in 1991, and was completed in 2006. The following modifications were made:

- lowering the bottom of the centre channel;
- renovation of the drainage system (separate system) and the line channels;
- renewal of electromechanical equipment;
- operational and fire ventilation adapted to contemporary needs;
- creating an emergency escape tunnel;
- demolition and reconstruction of the roadway construction;
- renewal of cladding panels;
- repair, while maintaining the traffic flow.

The total construction costs amounted to approximately CHF 236 million (approximately 148 million euros).

The Mont Blanc Tunnel fire between France and Italy in 1999 triggered a general safety review of road tunnels in several countries, including Switzerland. In September 2007, the San Bernardino Tunnel saw the completion of a major safety upgrade. Lighting has been increased and becomes more evenly diffused, with a corresponding improvement in visibility. Particular care has been taken with the visibility of access points to the reworked escape tunnel, minimizing the risk of escape routes becoming obscured by smoke in the event of a major conflagration.
