= Bärenburg =

Village in Switzerland

Coordinates: 46.594°N 9.4277°E

Bärenburg is a village near to Andeer in Switzerland.
