= European route E43 =

Road in trans-European E-road network

E43

Major junctions
- South end: Bellinzona, Switzerland
- North end: Würzburg, Germany

Location
- Countries: Switzerland; Austria; Germany

Highway system
- International E-road network; A Class; B Class

European route E43 is an E-road going from Bellinzona in Switzerland over Chur, Switzerland and Ulm, Germany to Würzburg, Germany.

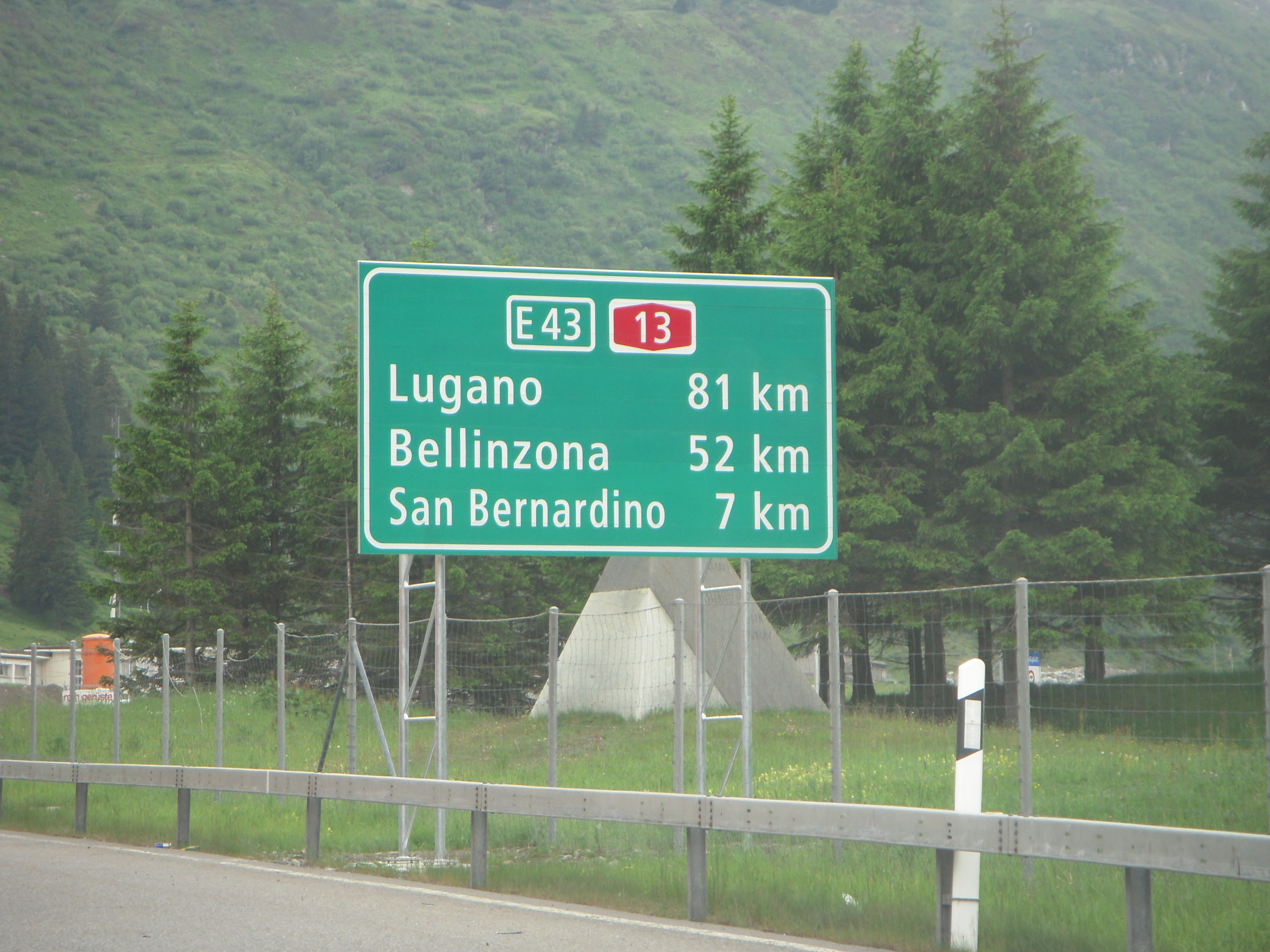
Graubunden, Switzerland
