= San Bernardino Pass =

Mountain pass in the Swiss Alps

- Italian: Passo del San Bernardino; German: Bernhardinpass
- Summit of San Bernardino pass

- Location within Switzerland
- Elevation: 2,066 metres (6,778 ft)
- Traversed by: Road

Third Approach
- Location: Graubünden, Switzerland
- Range: Lepontine Alps
- Coordinates: 46°29′46″N 9°10′15″E
- Topo map: Swiss Federal Office of Topography swisstopo

San Bernardino Pass (Italian: Passo del San Bernardino, German: Bernhardinpass, 2,066 metres (6,778 ft)) is a high mountain pass in the Swiss Alps connecting the Hinterrhein and the Mesolcina (Misox) valleys between Thusis (canton of Graubünden) and Bellinzona (canton of Ticino). Located in the far eastern side of the Western Alps it is not to be confused with the Great St Bernard Pass and the Little St Bernard Pass. The top of the pass represents both the Italo-German language frontier and the watershed (drainage divide) between the Po basin and the Rhine basin. Marscholsee is within the pass at an elevation of 2,053 m (6,736 ft).

The route first became important as a mule track in the fifteenth century when the route between Thusis and Splügen was known as the Via Mala. A road for wheeled vehicles was opened in 1770; this road was significantly improved between 1821 and 1823, financed in part by the Kingdom of Sardinia, keen to improve a trade route connecting Genoa and Piedmont to the Graubünden that was not directly controlled by Austria.

Traffic flow was much facilitated when in 1967, the San Bernardino road tunnel was completed: since then vehicle traffic on the pass has been reduced, benefiting those taking the time to avoid the tunnel. The pass road is only open from May to November.

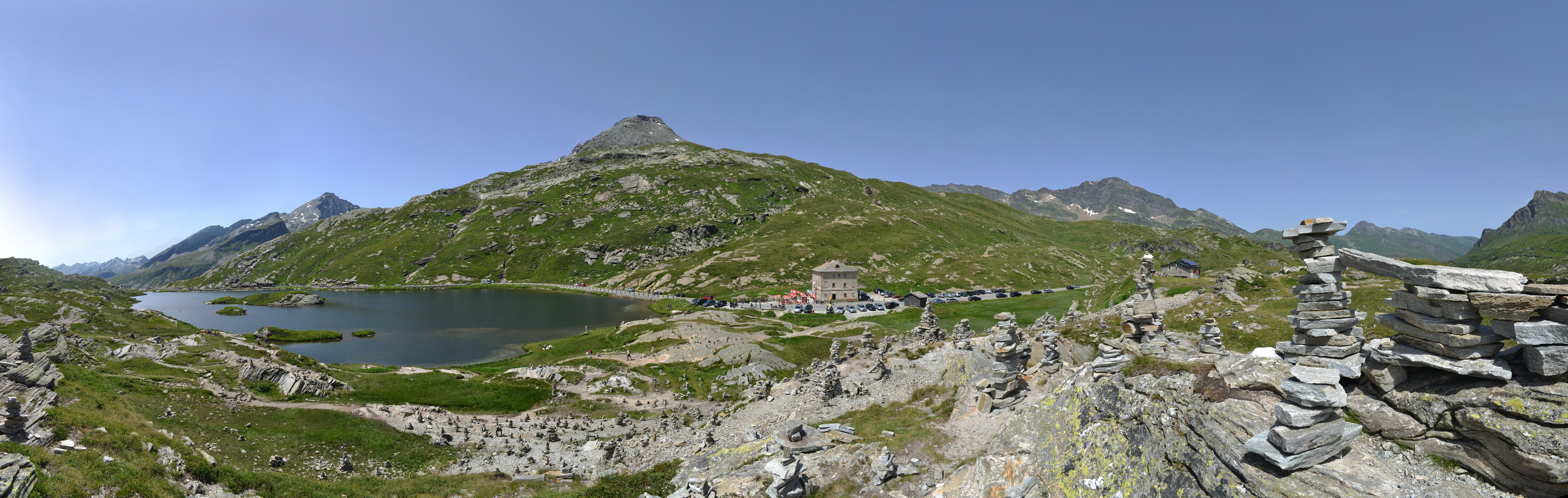
San Bernardino Pass and Laghetto Moesola

== Climate ==
The average climatic conditions for San Bernardino village at the entry point to the San Bernardino tunnel at 1,639 m (5,377 ft) are given in the following chart.

Climate data for S. Bernardino village (1981-2010)
Month	Jan	Feb	Mar	Apr	May	Jun	Jul	Aug	Sep	Oct	Nov	Dec	Year
Mean daily maximum °C (°F)	0.6 (33.1)	0.7 (33.3)	3.2 (37.8)	5.8 (42.4)	10.8 (51.4)	15.1 (59.2)	17.8 (64.0)	17.2 (63.0)	13.2 (55.8)	9.2 (48.6)	3.8 (38.8)	1.0 (33.8)	8.2 (46.8)
Daily mean °C (°F)	−3.6 (25.5)	−3.6 (25.5)	−0.9 (30.4)	1.9 (35.4)	6.5 (43.7)	10.5 (50.9)	13.0 (55.4)	12.4 (54.3)	8.9 (48.0)	4.9 (40.8)	0.0 (32.0)	−3.0 (26.6)	3.9 (39.0)
Mean daily minimum °C (°F)	−7.6 (18.3)	−7.5 (18.5)	−4.7 (23.5)	−1.5 (29.3)	2.6 (36.7)	6.0 (42.8)	8.3 (46.9)	8.1 (46.6)	5.0 (41.0)	1.3 (34.3)	−3.3 (26.1)	−6.5 (20.3)	0.0 (32.0)
Average precipitation mm (inches)	89 (3.5)	62 (2.4)	95 (3.7)	171 (6.7)	216 (8.5)	188 (7.4)	188 (7.4)	193 (7.6)	202 (8.0)	182 (7.2)	162 (6.4)	105 (4.1)	1,854 (73.0)
Average snowfall cm (inches)	95.3 (37.5)	77.8 (30.6)	76.4 (30.1)	92.8 (36.5)	13.6 (5.4)	0.5 (0.2)	0 (0)	0 (0)	1.4 (0.6)	9.9 (3.9)	64.6 (25.4)	89.4 (35.2)	521.7 (205.4)
Average precipitation days (≥ 1.0 mm)	7.5	6.7	8.5	11.2	14.7	12.0	11.5	12.4	10.1	10.7	9.4	8.2	122.9
Average snowy days (≥ 1.0 cm)	8.9	7.5	7.4	8	1.8	0.1	0	0	0.2	1.6	6.9	8.6	51
Average relative humidity (%)	63	64	65	71	74	71	71	73	75	76	71	68	70
Mean monthly sunshine hours	101	109	140	120	125	150	172	159	138	114	88	88	1,504
Source: MeteoSwiss

== See also ==
- List of highest paved roads in Europe
- List of mountain passes
- List of the highest Swiss passes

== Bibliography ==
- Nicola Pfund, Sui passi in bicicletta - Swiss Alpine passes by bicycle, Fontana Edizioni, 2012, p. 134-139. ISBN 978-88-8191-281-0
