= Lunghin =

Lunghin may refer to:

- Piz Lunghin, a peak in the Grisons, Switzerland
- Lägh dal Lunghin, a nearby lake
- Lunghin Pass, a mountain pass
