= Chalandamarz =

Spring festival in Switzerland

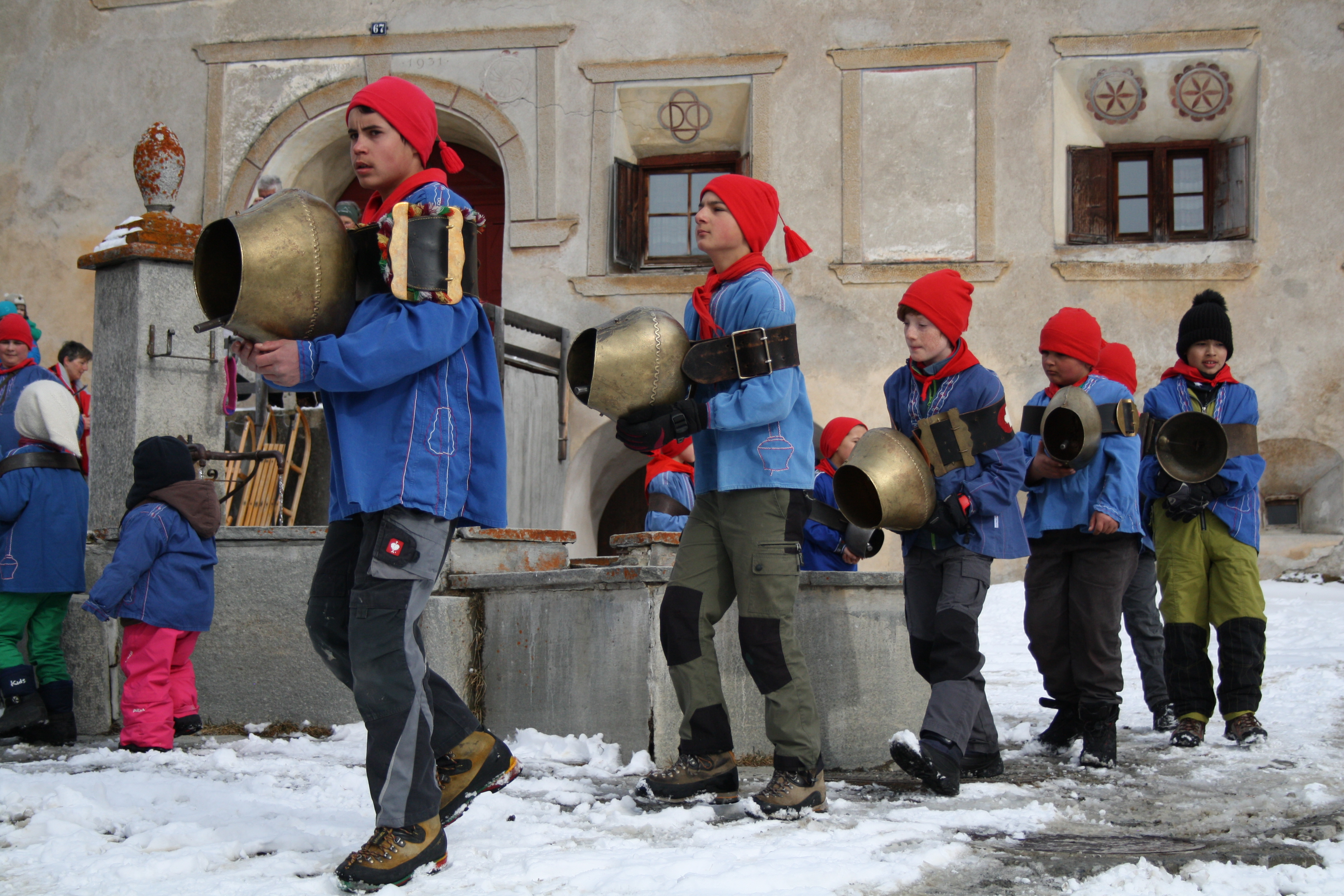
Chalandamarz 2017 in Guarda

Chalandamarz is a traditional spring festival in Romansh-speaking and Italian-speaking parts of the Swiss canton of Grisons. It is celebrated on, and named for, the First of March (Calendae Martis) and marks the end of winter.

It is celebrated in much of the Romansh-speaking area, including the Engadin, Val Müstair, Albula (Surmeir), and formerly in the Posterior Rhine valley, as well as in the Italian-speaking parts of Grisons (Poschiavo, Bregaglia and Mesolcina). It is not known in the Surselva. Trin in the Sutselva has a similar tradition, known as the Muntinadas.

The form Chalandamarz ([tɕɐˌlandɐˈmarts]) represents the Engadin dialects (Vallader and Putèr); Surmiran variants of the name are Calondamars(a), -marza; Italian (Lombard) variants used in the southern valleys are Calendamarz, Calentmarz.

On the first of March, and often at least one day before, the boys of each village go around and ring bells and sing. The object is to mark the beginning of a new year in spring, to scare away the evil spirits of winter and wake up the good spirits of spring. Girls traditionally don’t take part in this, but in some villages girls carry baskets around to gather money, and in some villages they carry bells too. Often the boys march around the village fountains, and go into the old houses and sing. After this, there is often whip-cracking. In the evening on the first of March, there is often a party with dancing. The procession of boys at Chalandamarz is often led by the oldest boys who are due to leave school the following year. These are known as Patruns ("patrons, masters").

Use of cowbells to drive out winter is known from other Alpine folklore, such as the Perchten or Fasnacht traditions of Alemannic and Austro-Bavarian speaking areas. The Chalandamarz in Ftan, Lower Engadin, shows influence from Fasnacht traditions in the wearing of masks. In Poschiavo and Mesolcina, formerly also in Scuol, Tschlin and Innerferrera, a straw effigy symbolizing winter is burned.

== Bells ==
Types of cowbells used:

- Talacs are small bells and the only ones which are still worn by cows in the Engadin.
- Plumpas are some of the largest bells, often made of bronze or brass to provide good sound.
- Maruns are round bells made of steel in a thin layer, and often black in colour. The largest of these are the largest bells in Chalandamarz, up to half a metre in diameter.
- Brunzinas are of a more widely recognized shape. They are often brass and make a unique sound. They are sometimes worn only by girls in villages where they too carry bells.
- Zampuogns are slightly different from other bells, but not as eccentric as brunzinas. From the outside they are very smooth, made of bronze and brass and can easily crack. Their ringer is very thick and it often produces a low but clear sound. They are heavier than regular plumpas.
- Rolls are large belts with roll-bells attached. They are often worn by the oldest boys, the youngest or the oldest Patruns. Some villages still retain the tradition of using horses to pull the boys to smaller villages on the outskirts of the main village, and in this case the horses wear them.
