= Jauer dialect =

Dialect of the Romansh language

Jauer
- jauer
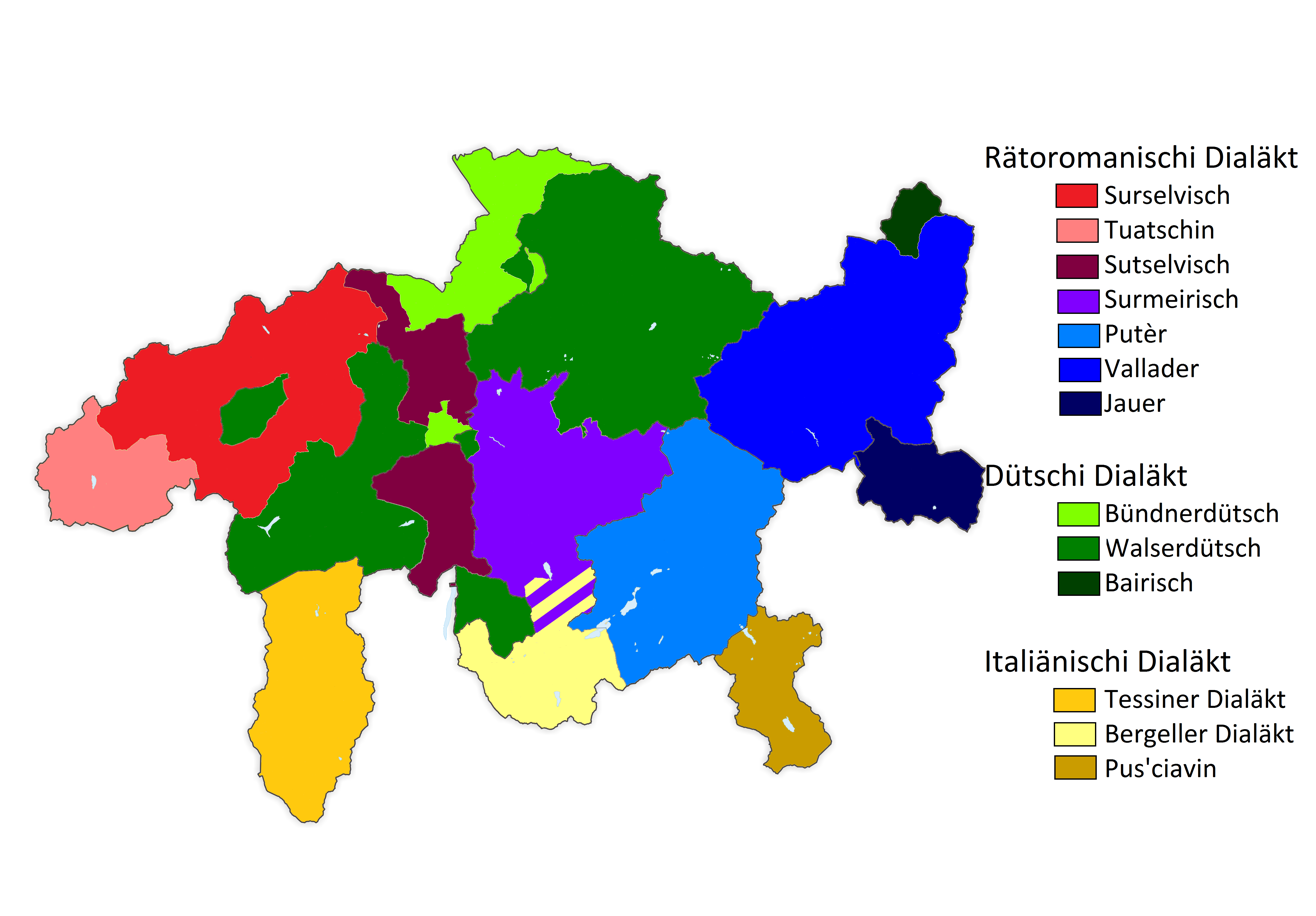
- Historical distribution of the dialects of Romansh, German, and Italian in Graubünden
- Pronunciation: [ˈjawər]
- Native to: Switzerland
- Region: Val Müstair
- Language family: Indo-European: Italic; Latino-Faliscan; Romance; Italo-Western; Western Romance; Gallo-Romance; Rhaeto-Romance or Gallo-Rhaetian; Romansh; Jauer

Language codes
- ISO 639-3: –
- IETF: rm-jauer

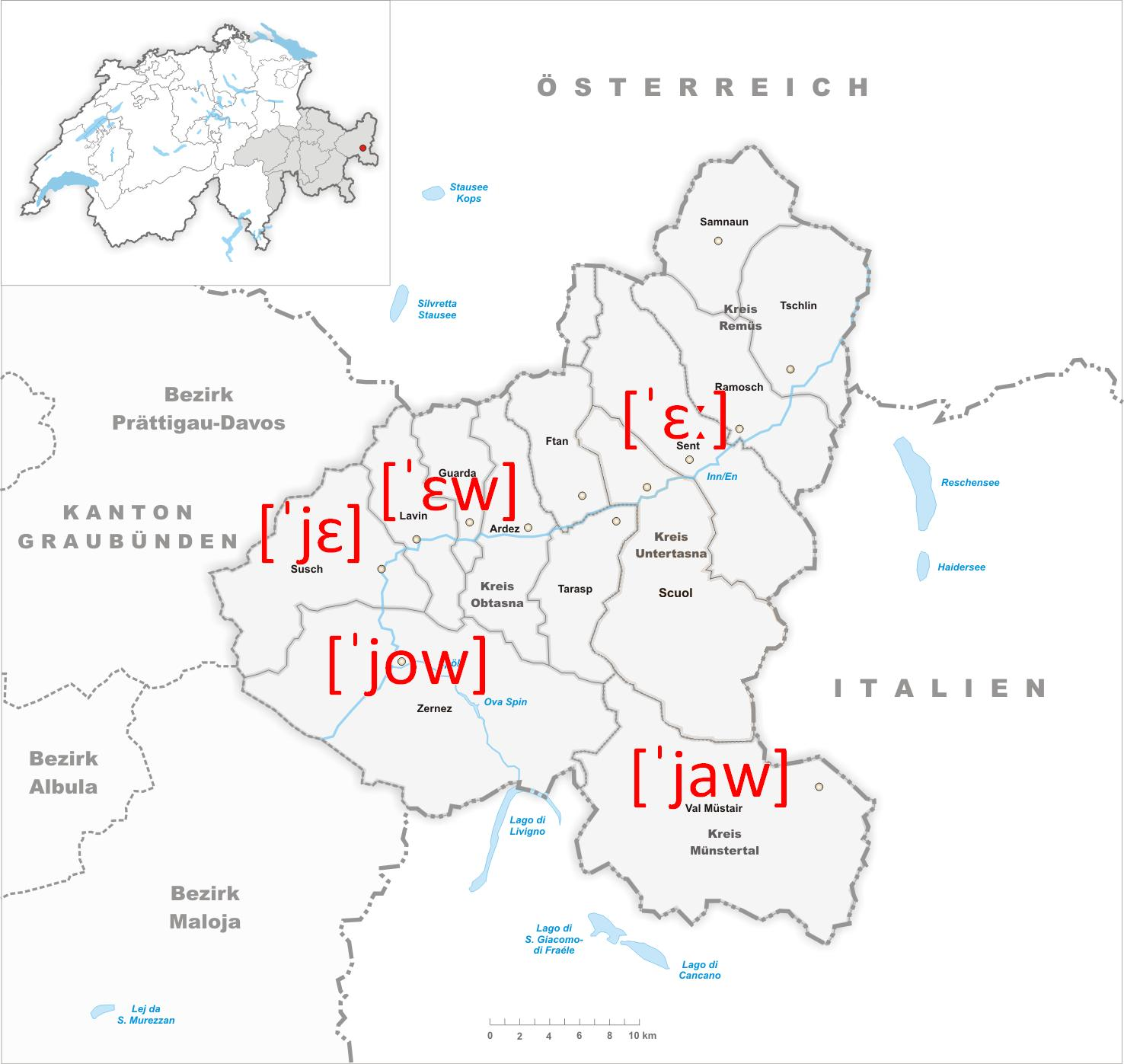
Pronunciation of eu ('I') in the dialects of the Lower Engadine and the Val Müstair, as attested in 1962.

Jauer (Romansh: jauer, pronounced [ˈjawər]) is a dialect of Romansh that is spoken in the Val Müstair. It is closely related to the neighboring dialect of the Lower Engadine, Vallader as well as Putèr spoken the Upper Engadine. The name of the dialect is derived from a nickname based on the personal pronoun jau [ˈjaw] 'I', and can be translated as 'the jau-sayers', as this contrasts with Vallader eu, pronounced [ˈɛː], [ˈɛw], [ˈjɛ], [ˈjɐ], or [ˈjow] in the Lower Engadine.

Other features distinguishing Jauer from Vallader include the placement of stress on the penultimate syllable of certain verbs, as well as the infinitive verb ending -er as opposed to Vallader -ar. In addition, stressed /a/ is diphthongized in Jauer. All three traits can be seen in the verb 'to sing', which is chantàr in Vallader but chàunter in Jauer.

== Sociolinguistics ==
According to the Swiss census of 2000, 86.4% in the Val Müstair report to speak Romansh habitually, and 74.1% declare it as their language of best command. This amounts to around 1,400 speakers in absolute numbers in the year 2000.

Jauer is usually not written; the written standard in Val Müstair is traditionally Vallader. Jauer is occasionally written regardless, and in 2007, a collection of short stories written in Jauer (Dschon Uein id atras istorias grischunas) was published.

In official use and as the language of school, Vallader has traditionally been used in the Val Müstair. In 2007, the valley was one of the first municipalities of the canton to introduce the pan-regional Romansh variety Rumantsch Grischun as the language of schooling and official use. In 2012 however, a municipal assembly voted to return to the use of Vallader in schools.

As with other Romansh speakers, virtually all speakers of Jauer with the exception of children below school-age are also proficient in both Swiss German and Swiss Standard German. Additionally, many people in Val Müstair also speak Bavarian German as a second language due to contacts with neighboring South Tyrol.

== Sample text ==
The fable The Fox and the Crow by Aesop, translated into Jauer, the neighboring Romansh dialects Vallader and Putèr, as well as Rumantsch Grischun.

Jauer
La uolp d’era darchiau üna jada fomantada. Qua ha’la vis sün ün pin ün corv chi tegnea ün toc chaschöl in ses pical. Quai ma gustess, ha’la s’impissà, ed ha clomà al corv: «Cha bel cha tü esch! Scha tes chaunt es ischè bel sco tia apparentscha, lura esch tü il pü bel utschè da tots».

Vallader
audio
La vuolp d'eira darcheu üna jada fomantada. Qua ha'la vis sün ün pin ün corv chi tgnaiva ün toc chaschöl in seis pical. Quai am gustess, ha'la pensà, ed ha clomà al corv: «Che bel cha tü est! Scha teis chant es uschè bel sco tia apparentscha, lura est tü il plü bel utschè da tuots».

Putèr
audio
La vuolp d’eira darcho üna vouta famanteda. Co ho'la vis sün ün pin ün corv chi tgnaiva ün töch chaschöl in sieu pical. Que am gustess, ho'la penso, ed ho clamo al corv: «Che bel cha tü est! Scha tieu chaunt es uschè bel scu tia apparentscha, alura est tü il pü bel utschè da tuots».

Rumantsch Grischun
audio
La vulp era puspè ina giada fomentada. Qua ha ella vis sin in pign in corv che tegneva in toc chaschiel en ses pichel. Quai ma gustass, ha ella pensà, ed ha clamà al corv: «Tge bel che ti es! Sche tes chant è uschè bel sco tia parita, lur es ti il pli bel utschè da tuts».

Translation
The fox was hungry yet again. Then he saw a crow sitting on top of a tree, who was a holding a piece of cheese in his beak. This I would like, he thought, and said to the crow: "how pretty you are! If your song is as beautiful as your plumage, then you are the most beautiful of all the birds".
