= Oscar Peer =

Swiss novelist, playwright and philologist

- Born: Oscar Peer; 23 April 1928; Lavin, Switzerland
- Died: 22 December 2013 (aged 85); Chur, Switzerland
- Education: University of Zurich, Sorbonne
- Relatives: Andri Peer
- Writing career
- Language: Romansch, German
- Genres: novel, short story, drama
- Notable awards: Swiss Schiller Prize for literature

Oscar Peer (23 April 1928 – 22 December 2013) was a Swiss novelist, playwright and philologist. His works were written in Romansch and German, and comprised epic novels, short stories, and drama. He was also well known for his Ladin-German dictionary.

== Life ==
Oscar Peer was born on 23 April 1928 in Lavin, in the Lower Engadine, Switzerland. His father, Jon Peer, was a one-time lumberjack, while his mother Silva Wieser belonged to a farming family. He was the fourth of five children.

Peer began his training as a machinist before abandoning his apprenticeship to join a teachers' training school in Chur. He taught in Tschierv and Felsberg as a primary school teacher. He then proceeded to study German and Romance language at the University of Zurich and Sorbonne. He obtained his PhD with a dissertation on Gian Fontana, a writer in Surselva. He worked as a middle-school teacher in Winterthur, and finally as a lecturer at the Chur teachers' training college.

Peer met his wife, Monica, at the training college ^{—} he was a substitute teacher and she, a student. They had two children, Simon and Leta.

Peer died from a long illness on 22 December 2013 in Chur.

== Career ==
Oscar Peer was encouraged to take up writing by his older brother Andri Peer, who was also a novelist. His first published piece of narrative, A Wedding in Winter, came out in 1972. His Vallader story Accord was published in 1978; it was made into a film in 1985. He often wrote in the Vallader dialect, and in German. His later books came out in both languages, but were not mere translations of each other. Instead, both language versions contained their own nuances and often deviated from each other; they could be considered significant works in their own right.

Peer rewrote his works several times and republished them in new editions. He would be satisfied with a book only when he could re-read it with a good conscience. One of his earliest works was the short story Chasa Veglia, published in his brother's collection Chalender Ladin. He continued to rework this piece until the most recent version was published in 2010, both in German and Romansch.

The world of rural Lower Engadine, where Peer was born, influenced both him and his work. His motifs were of a person excluded in a small country, of loners and rule-breakers. But he was not overtly a political writer, and in most of his prose works, history and politics are subsumed under the narrative. An exception is his memoir Das Raunen des Flusses in which the reader is introduced to the characters and places of Peer's formative years, and the events of the 1930s and 1940s in the Lower Engardine are reported.

Peer's philological career culminated in the compilation of the Rumantsch Dicziunari, ladin-tudais-ch, a multilingual dictionary. With this, he was able to establish a solid base for the Romansch language. Peer was a strong advocate of the importance of local idiom over standardised language.

With the decline in the number of speakers of the Romansch dialects in Switzerland, the readership of works in the language has also reduced. Peer's efforts to sustain the tradition complement those of his peers - Ruth Plouda, Gion Deplazes, Clo Dori Bezzola, Andri Peer and Cla Biert.

== Select bibliography ==
=== Philology ===
- Dicziunari rumantsch ladintudais-ch. Ed. Lia rumantscha. 1962.

=== Short stories and narrative ===
- Eine Hochzeit im Winter (in German). Gute Schriften. 1972. ISBN 978-3-7185-0373-5.
- Gärten über dem Strom: drei Erzählungen (in German). Benziger. 1983. ISBN 978-3-545-36365-6.
- Akkord / Il retuorn (in German and Romansh). Limmat. 2005. ISBN 978-3-857914-86-7.
- 'In tschercha dal figl (in Romansh). Uniun dals Grischs. 2005. ISBN 978-3-908611-21-9.
- Eva ed il sonch Antoni (in Romansh). Uniun dals Grischs. 2003. ISBN 978-3-908611-16-5.

=== Novels ===
- Viadi sur cunfin: roman (in Romansh). Uniun dals Grischs. 1981.
- Grenzstation: Roman (in German). Benziger. 1984. ISBN 978-3-545-36375-5.
- Nozzas d'inviern (in Romansh). Uniun dals Grischs. 1988.

=== Memoir ===
- La rumur dal flüm Zernez 1999 (In German: Das Raunen des Flusses, 2007).

== Awards and recognition ==
Peer won the Swiss Schiller Prize in 1996 for his entire oeuvre.

In 2014, Peer will posthumously receive the Bündner Literature prize.
