= Piz Lunghin =

Mountain in Switzerland

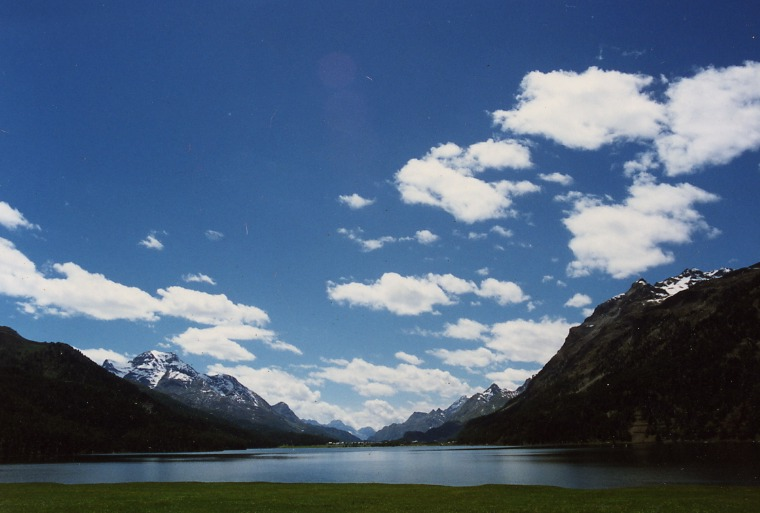
- Lake Sils and Piz Lunghin (centre right)

Highest point
- Elevation: 2,780 m (9,120 ft)
- Prominence: 135 m (443 ft)
- Parent peak: Piz Lagrev
- Listing: List of mountains of Switzerland
- Coordinates: 46°24′38″N 9°40′13″E

Geography
- Location within Canton of Grisons Location within Switzerland Location within Alps
- Location: Graubünden, Switzerland
- Parent range: Albula Range

Piz Lunghin (2,780 m) is a mountain in the Swiss canton of Graubünden, located in the Albula range, overlooking the Maloja Pass. It is considered as the "roof of Europe" as the peak is nearby the triple watershed of the Lunghin pass. Water running off this mountain can head towards the Mediterranean, the North Sea and the Black Sea, respectively by the rivers Po, Rhein, and Danube.

== Geography and hydrography ==
Piz Lunghin lies at the upper end of the Engadine (east) and the Bregaglia (west) valleys. The Maloja Pass, which connects the two valleys, is located 2 km south-east from the peak. The north side of the mountain lies in the protected area Parc Ela.

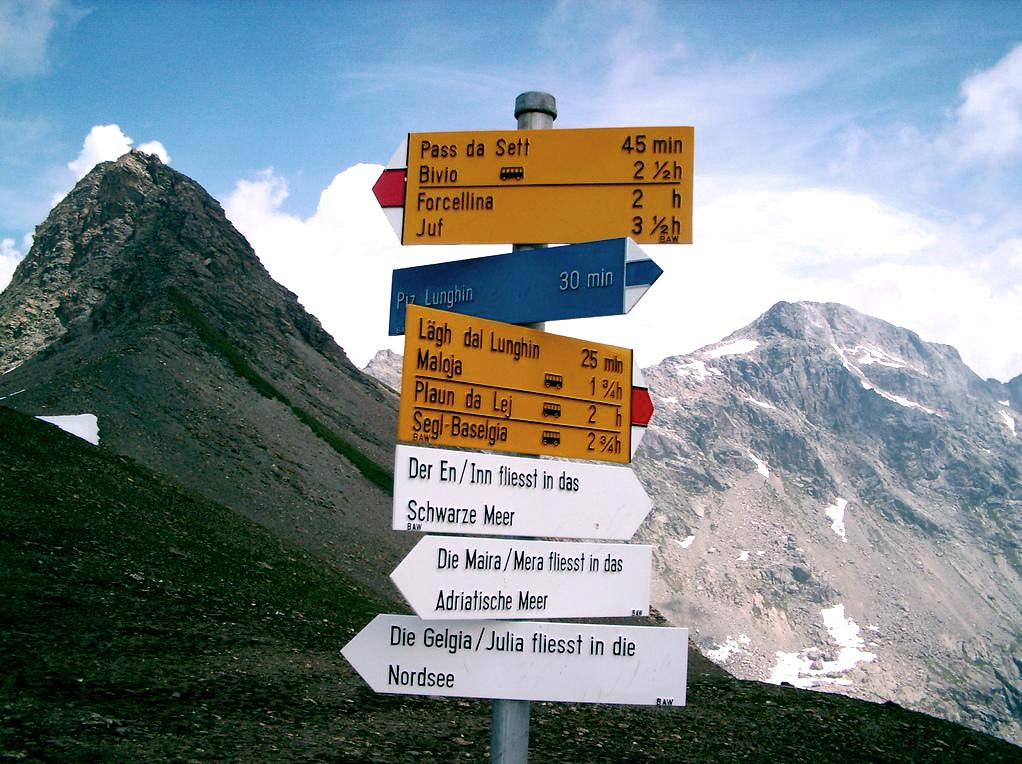
Pass Lunghin

The notable triple watershed is in fact located 600 metres from the summit itself, at the Lunghin Pass, at 2645 m (46°24′48.70″N 9°39′49.20″E). The north-west side feeds a stream ending in the Gelgia, a tributary of the Albula, itself a tributary of the Rhine. From the south-west side the water flows towards the Mera in Val Bregaglia, that flows into the Adda, a tributary of the Po. The Inn originates instead from Lägh dal Lunghin below the peak, east to the pass. The Inn is a tributary of the Danube.

- The Rhine enters the North Sea 740 km north
- The Po enters the Adriatic Sea 275 km south-east
- The Danube enters the Black Sea 1560 km east

== Climbing and hiking ==
The summit can be reached easily from the north flank via a trail starting from the Lunghin Pass. The pass connects Bivio on the north (via the Septimer Pass) to Maloja in the Engadine on the east. The shortest access is from the latter. From Maloja (1810 m) the trail follows the young Inn and leads to the pass in a few hours of walking.

A signposted multiday trekking route passes the pass as well, called Senda Segantini after the painter Giovanni Segantini that worked on his most famous works in those areas.

== See also ==
- Witenwasserenstock, a Swiss mountain triple watershed of Rhine, Po and Rhône.
