= Piz Muragl =

Mountain in Switzerland

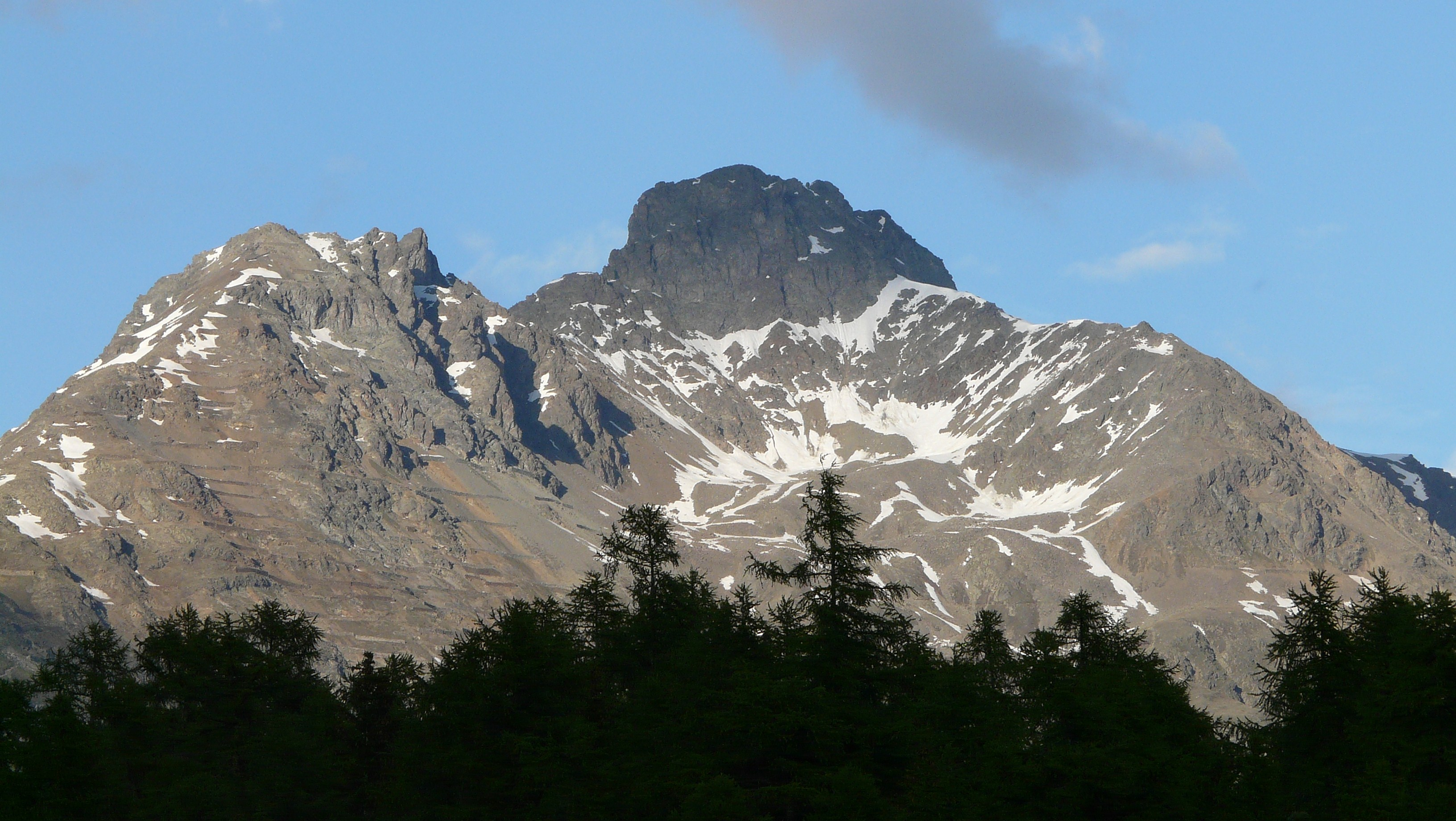
- View from St. Moritz (west side)

Highest point
- Elevation: 3,157 m (10,358 ft)
- Prominence: 162 m (531 ft)
- Parent peak: Piz Languard
- Coordinates: 46°29′52″N 9°56′14″E

Geography
- Location within Switzerland
- Location: Graubünden, Switzerland
- Parent range: Livigno Alps

Piz Muragl is a mountain of the Livigno Alps, overlooking Pontresina in the canton of Graubünden. It lies on the range south of the Val Muragl.
