= Engadin =

Valley in the Swiss Alps

Coordinates: 46.5497°N 9.8959°E

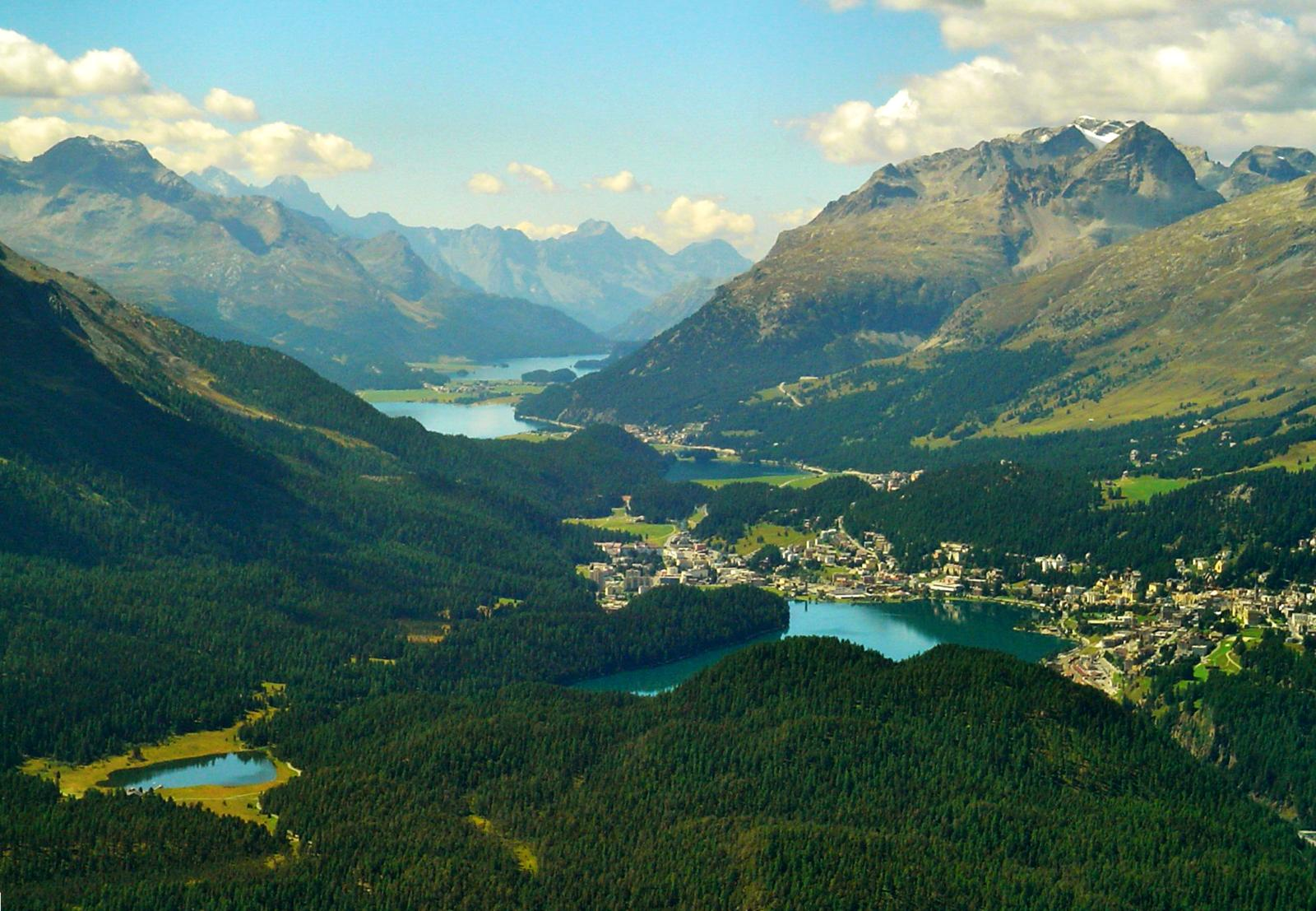
The lakes of the upper Engadine and the town of St. Moritz

The Engadin or Engadine (Romansh: Engiadina [eɲdʑɐˈdiːnɐ]; (Note: This is the name in the two Romansh idioms that are spoken in the Engadin, Vallader and Puter, as well as in Sursilvan and Rumantsch Grischun. In Surmiran, the name is Nagiadegna, and in Sutsilvan, it is Gidegna.) German: Engadin [ˈɛŋɡadiːn] or [ɛŋɡaˈdiːn]; Italian: Engadina; French: Engadine) is a long high Alpine valley region in the eastern Swiss Alps in the canton of Graubünden in southeasternmost Switzerland with about 25,000 inhabitants. It follows the route of the Inn (Romansh: En) from its headwaters at Maloja Pass in the southwest running roughly northeast until the Inn flows into Austria, little less than one hundred kilometers downstream. The En/Inn subsequently flows at Passau into the Danube, making it the only Swiss river to drain into the Black Sea. The Engadine is protected by high mountain ranges on all sides and is famous for its sunny climate, scenic landscapes and outdoor activities.

== Name ==
In English, the valley is known as either Engadin (German pronunciation: [ˈɛŋɡadiːn], locally also [ɛŋɡaˈdiːn]) or Engadine (/ˈɛŋɡədiːn/ ENG-gə-deen, US also /ˌɛŋɡəˈdiːn/ ENG-gə-DEEN).

The Romansh toponym Engiadina was first attested as Latin vallis Eniatina in AD 930. A derivation from the reconstructed ethnonym *Eniates (with a Celtic suffix -ates denoting "settlers, inhabitants", as in Licates or Atrebates) has been suggested, with the first part of the ethnonym in turn containing the name of the En (Aenus (Enus)). By that derivation the name would mean lit. 'Valley of the Inn people'.

Especially in touristic and advertising contexts, the meaning of the name is widely given as "garden of the Inn", presumably based on an incorrect folk etymology involving the Italian word giardino. The Romansh languages retain descendants of Latin hortus to refer to a garden, namely üert or iert, and not the ultimately Germanic loanword found in modern-day French and Italian.

== Geography ==
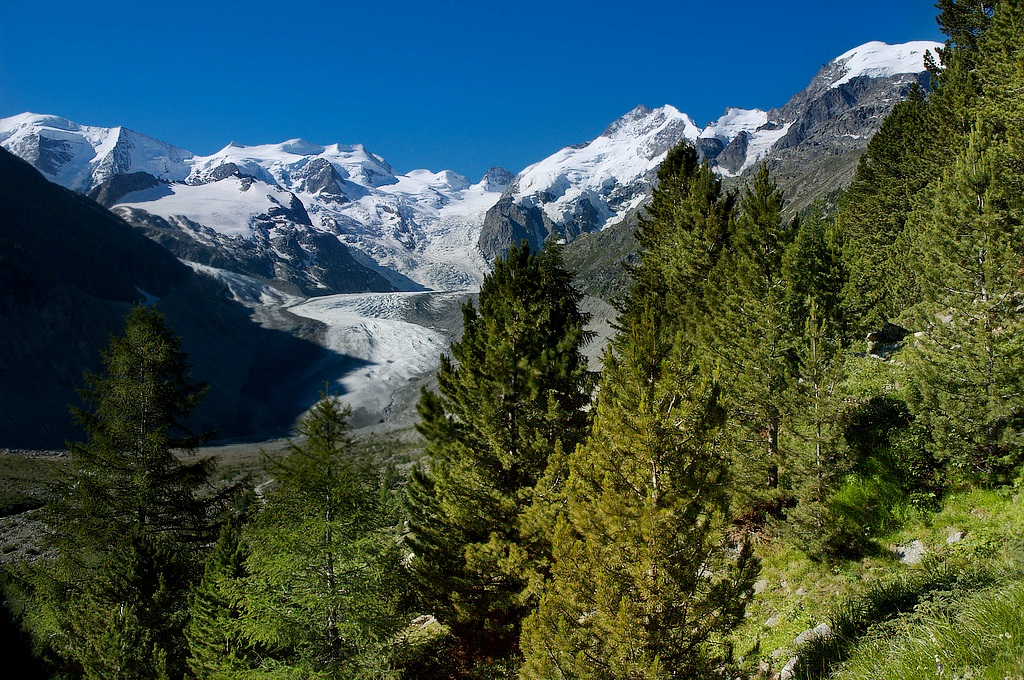
The highest peaks of the eastern Alps are in the Bernina range

The Engadine lies at the southeasternmost end of Switzerland and at the western end of the Eastern Alps, and constitutes the Swiss part of the 130 kilometres (81 mi)-long valley drained by the En/Inn until it turns northeast again after a large bend to northwest just before Landeck in Austria. The Austrian part is simply called the Oberinntal (upper Inn Valley). From the Maloja Pass (1,815 m (5,955 ft)) to the border of Tyrol, just before the Schergenbach, coming from Samnaun, enters the Inn, it runs for the whole Swiss length of 100 kilometres (62 mi), always above 1,000 metres (3,300 ft) in elevation.

The Engadine is connected by the Julier, Albula, and Flüela Passes and the Vereina Tunnel to the northern part of Switzerland and the rest of the canton of Grisons. It can be reached from northern Italy by the Maloja Pass to the west and the Bernina Pass to the south. Via the Pass dal Fuorn (German: Ofenpass) it connects to the southern Val Müstair (German: Münstertal) and further south over the border to the Val Venosta (German: Vinschgau) in Italy.

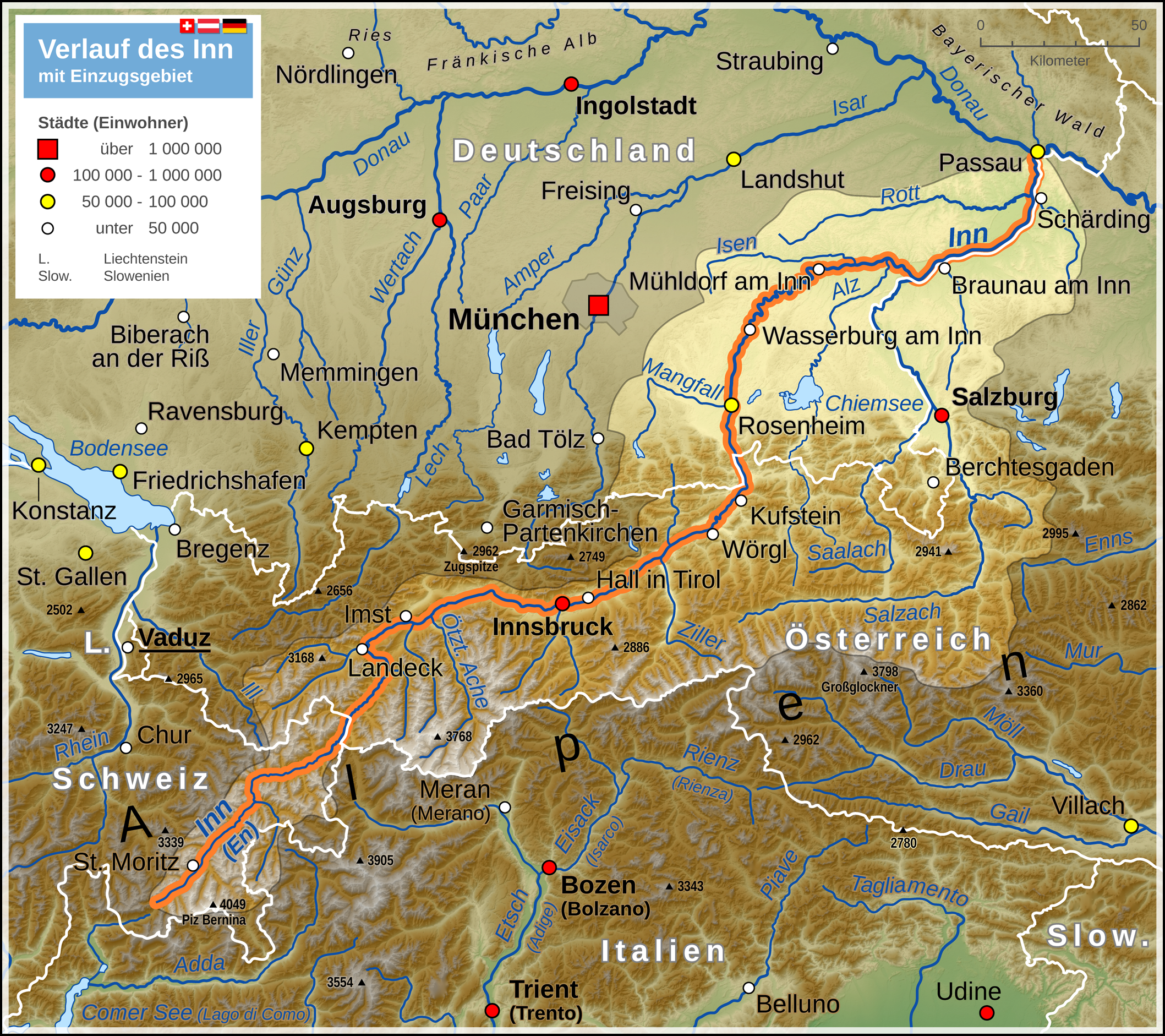
The Engadin is the valley of the Inn (En) in Switzerland (Schweiz)

Panorama of the Upper Engadine from Muottas Muragl, showing peaks Piz Muragl, Piz Julier and Piz Ot, as well as St. Moritz town and Celerina

The highest mountains in the wider area of the Engadine are in the Bernina Range in the southwestern part. The formation of the Engadine is linked to the activity of the Engadine Line.

The Engadine is traditionally divided into two parts:

1. The Upper Engadine, from Maloja Pass to the dell near Brail, in the west, where the valley stays fairly flat and is remarkably wide (up to 1.5 km (0.93 mi)) as far as S-chanf. Its major center is St. Moritz and very bustling during touristic peak seasons, winter and summer. The traditionally spoken Romansh idiom in the Upper Engadine is called Putèr.
2. The Lower Engadine, from Brail to the Austrian border in the far east, where the Inn drops more quickly, runs now more eastwards after Susch, the valley becomes narrower and steeper, and the En's path is more tortuous, the area is much more secluded and therefore more quiet; its major center is Scuol (1,243 m (4,078 ft)). The traditionally spoken Romansh idiom in the Lower Engadine is called Vallader.

=== Upper Engadine ===
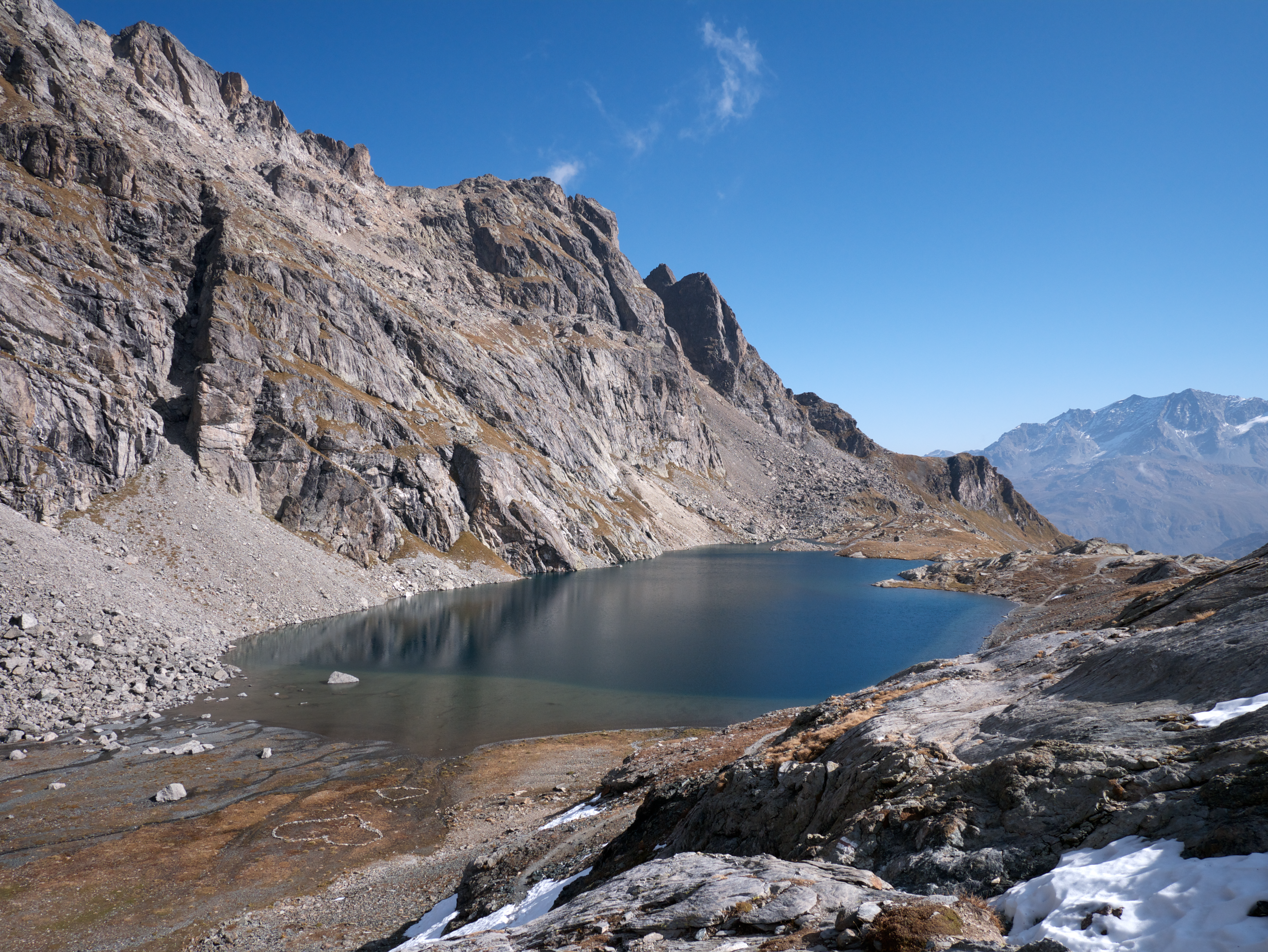
Lägh dal Lunghin near the source of the Inn

The Upper Engadine (Romansh: Engiadin'Ota; (Note: This is the name in the Romansh idiom that is spoken in the Upper Engadine, Puter, as well as in Vallader and Rumantsch Grischun. In Surmiran, the name is Nagiadegna ota, and in Sutsilvan, it is Gidegn'Òlta.) German: Oberengadin) begins at the Maloja mountain pass (1,815 m (5,955 ft)) in the southwest with a subsequent chain of lakes running southwest–northeast: Lej da Segl (English: Lake Sils, German: Silsersee), Lej da Silvaplauna (English: Lake Silvaplana, German: Silvaplanersee), both famous for windsurfing, and Lej da San Murezzan (1,768 m (5,801 ft); English: Lake St. Moritz, German: St. Moritzersee). To the southwestern side, the Maloja Pass drops precipitously down to the Italian spoken Val Bregaglia (German: Bergell) and then over the Swiss-Italian border further down to Chiavenna (325 m (1,066 ft)), and thence southwards to Como. Near the Lunghin Pass (2,645 m (8,678 ft)), northwest from and above Maloja, lies the most notable triple watershed in Western Europe, from where the water flows via the Inn and then via the Danube to the Black Sea, via the Maira and then via the Po to the Mediterranean Sea, and via the Gelgia and then via the Rhine to the North Sea.

The resort of St. Moritz at around 1,800 metres (5,900 ft) sits on Lej da San Murezzan. It was the host city for the 1928 and 1948 Winter Olympics. There are numerous ski resorts in the area served by the ski areas of Piz Corvatsch and Piz Nair.

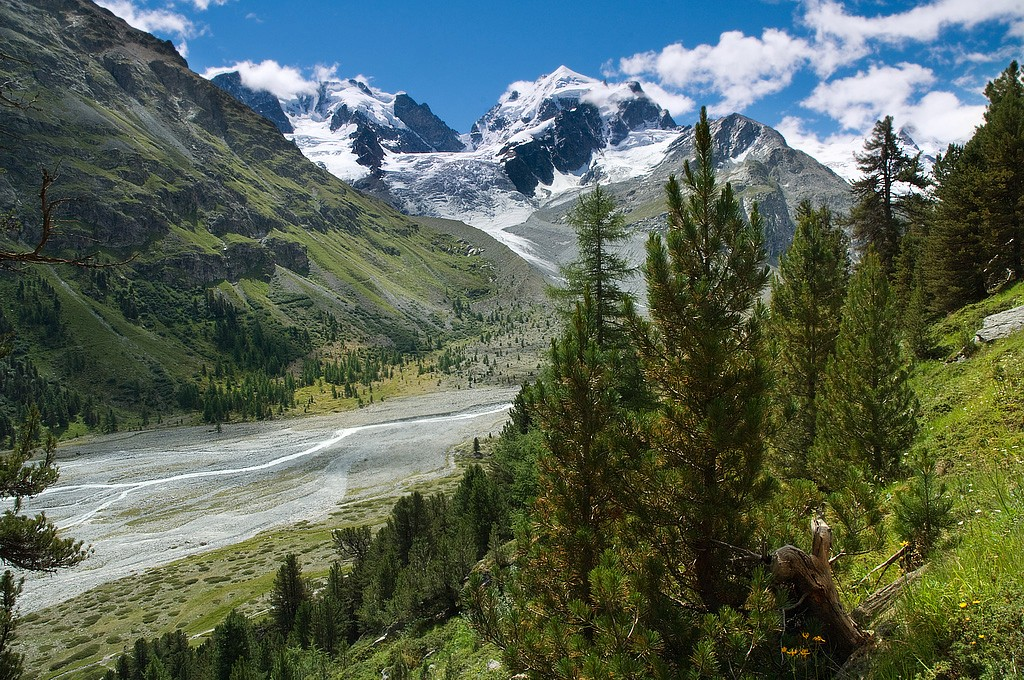
Val Roseg, south of Pontresina

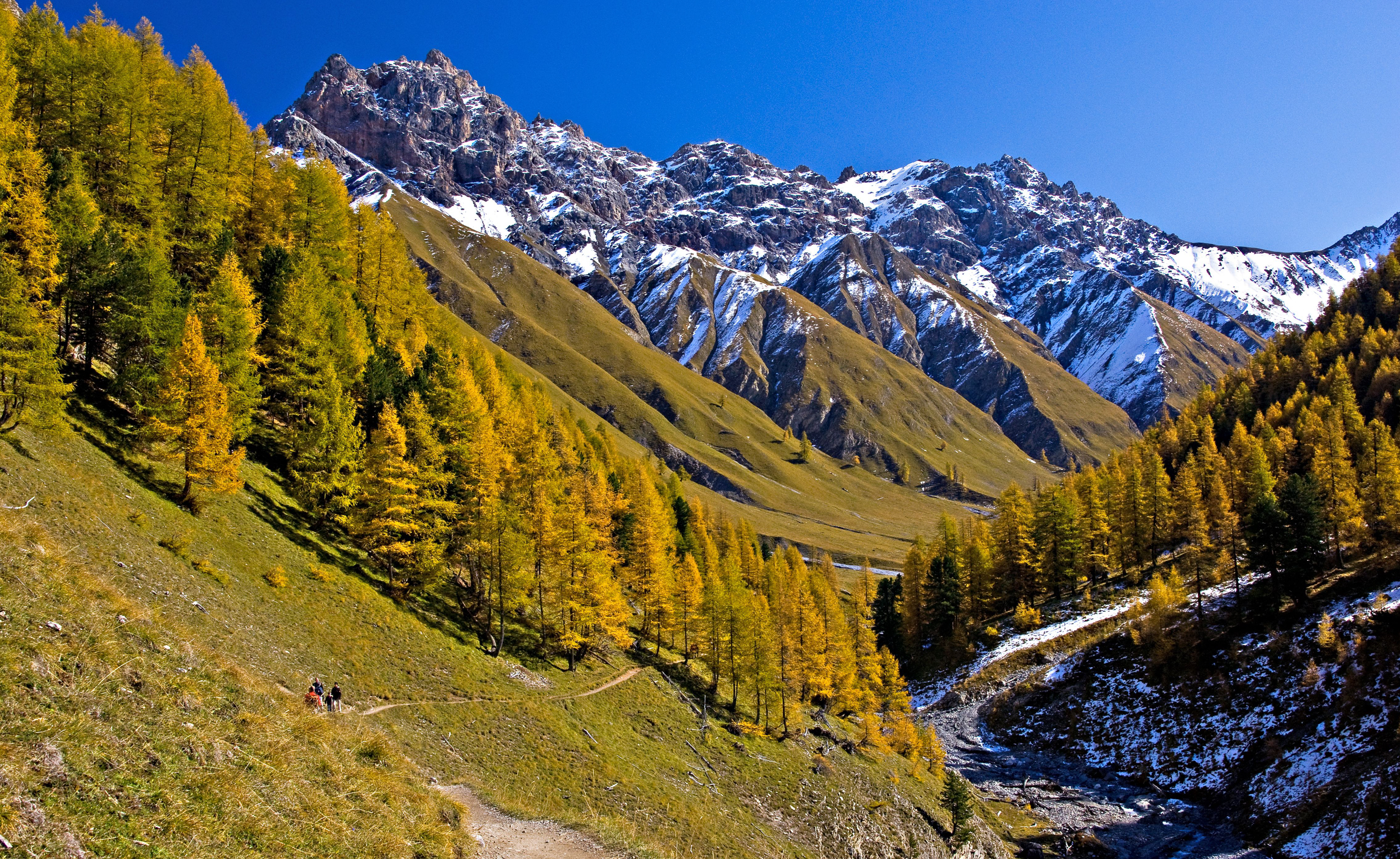
Val Trupchun in the Swiss National Park

Northeast of St. Moritz lies the village of Samedan, which is the capital of the Upper Engadine. Near Samedan, the river Flaz joins the Inn from the south and the valley opens into a wide meadow framed with mountains. The Flaz is a major tributary which flows north, down the Val Bernina starting in Pontresina at the confluence of the Ova da Roseg and Ova da Bernina. Here, on the flat between those two rivers, one also finds the Engadin Airport.

The highest mountain in the wider area of the Engadine – and in the Eastern Alps – is Piz Bernina, which is 4,049 metres (13,284 ft) high and 15 kilometres (9.3 mi) southeast of St. Moritz.

Further down from Samedan to the northeast are a number of villages lying on the banks of the Inn. One of it is Zuoz (1,720 m (5,640 ft)), which is a village of typical Engadine houses, with large, thick stone and masonry walls, funnel-shaped windows, and wall paintings called sgraffito. These houses are large and are traditionally shared by two or more families, and they may have what used to be a stable or livestock area underneath. In a typical Engadine village, there are numerous fountains, free-flowing all year round, which were formerly used for drinking water, washing, and for watering livestock.

The red trains by Rhaetian Railways (RhB) connects St. Moritz with Samedan and runs mainly on a north–south axis via the Albula Tunnel to the north and connects the Upper Engadine via Filisur and Thusis with Chur, the capital of the canton and consequently with the rest of Switzerland, and to the south via the Bernina Pass (2,253 m (7,392 ft), the highest traverse of a train in Europe) through the Val Bernina on its northern side and the Swiss but Italian spoken Val Poschiavo on its southern side with Tirano in Italy.

The RhB also connects the Upper Engadine with the Lower Engadine as far as Scuol, and connects the Lower Engadine since 1999 via the Vereina Tunnel to Klosters and the Prätigau; another connection to the rest of Switzerland. In the summer, the Albula Pass is also open for car travel. The Julier Pass, north above St. Moritz, connects the Engadine with the rest of Graubünden for the whole year. Regular Swiss PostBus lines connects the Upper Engadine with the Val Bregaglia, Chiavenna in Italy, and even further to Lugano in Switzerland again in the west.

Immediately next to northeast of Zuoz is the village of S-chanf, which is the end of the large flat meadows next to the Inn. Every year, there is a famous mass-cross-country ski race called the Engadin Skimarathon from Maloja, across the frozen lakes and over the open meadows and ending in S-chanf; 11'000 to 13'000 skiers participate every year.

Below S-chanf the landscape suddenly changes. The Inn, now rather wild, flows through a deep gorge with steep walls and meadows give way to larch woods. At Zernez, the Inn valley opens up again for a short distance. In Zernez (1,470 m (4,820 ft)) the Fuorn Pass goes south, passing through the Val del Spöl on its north side, where one part of the Swiss National Park is also to be found, to the Romansh-speaking Val Müstair (German: Münstertal) on its south side.

The border between the Upper and Lower Engadine is at the dell near Brail.

=== Lower Engadine ===
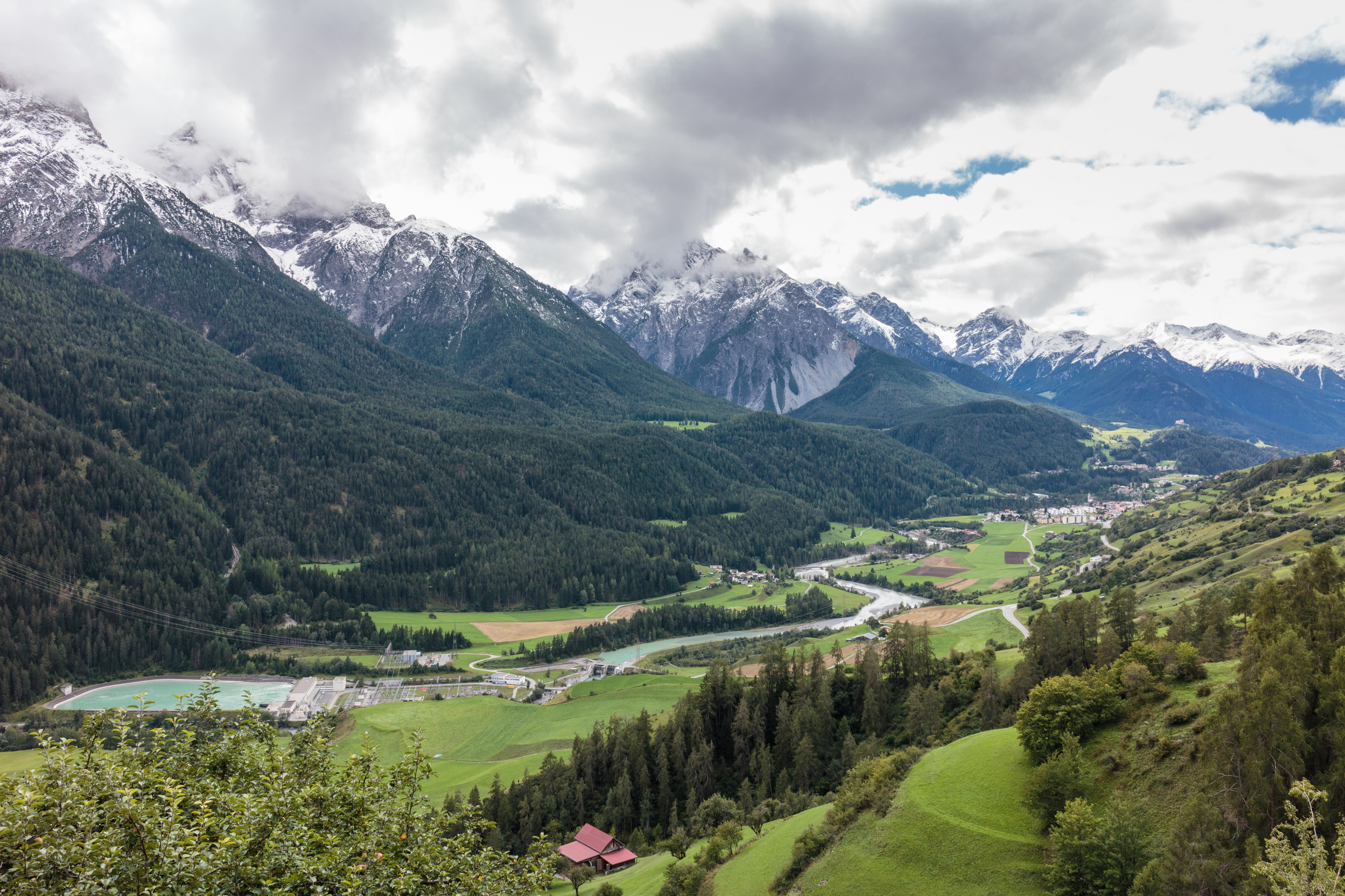
Engadine Dolomites near Scuol

With Brail the Lower Engadine (Romansh: Engiadina Bassa; (Note: This is the name in the Romansh idioms that are spoken in the Engadin, Vallader and Puter, as well as in Rumantsch Grischun. In Surmiran, the name is Nagiadegna bassa, and in Sutsilvan, it is Gidegna Bassa.) German: Unterengadin) begins. Here the villages are no longer located on the valley floor, with the exception of Zernez, but higher up on sunny terraces formed during glacial periods.

In contrast to the elevated plain of the Upper Engadine, where the upper reaches of the En flow gently down the valley, the geological background of the Lower Engadine forms a very different landscape. The right flank of the valley, the Lower Engadine Dolomites, is highly jagged, densely forested and steep. Glaciers and rivers have marked the left side of the valley in many different ways, where the geological structure has allowed for the formation of a fairly broad valley floor and softly rising, rounded landscape features with high-lying terraces, which is where most of the villages - with the notable exception of the main town Scuol - are located.

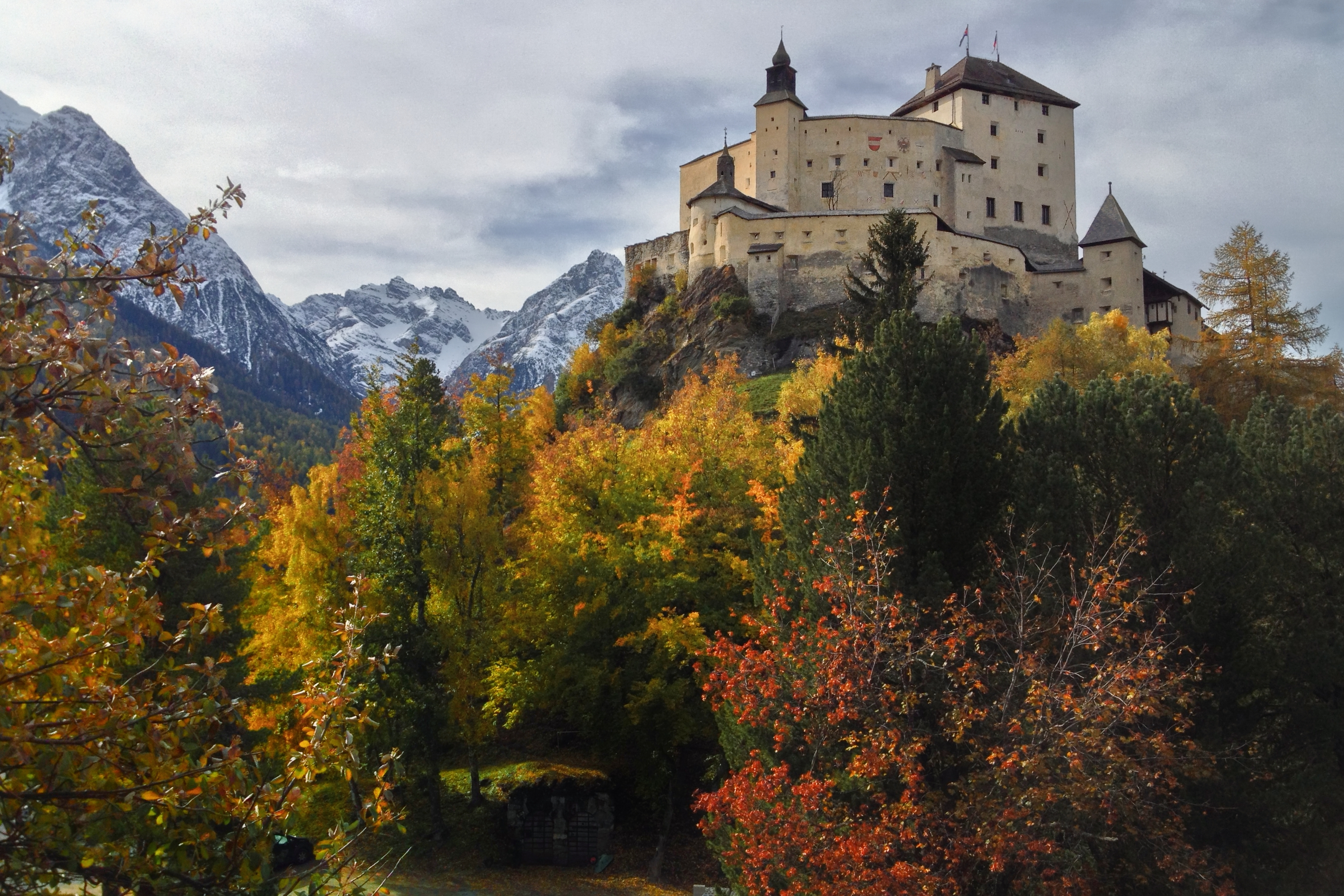
Tarasp Castle overlooking the valley

To the north, another train route connects the Lower Engadine with Klosters (and Davos) in the Prätigau via the recently built Vereina Tunnel. And further via Landquart to Chur or Zürich. The capital of the Lower Engadine is the ski and spa resort Scuol at around 1,200 metres (3,900 ft). At the very end of the Engadine, a curvaceous mountain road through the deep gorge-like Val da Tschera, not build before 1912, connects to the remote, very secluded and duty-free ski resort Samnaun, which shares a huge ski area with Austrian Ischgl.

Samnaun, as well as all larger and even most smaller villages in the main valley or its side valleys, is connected by regular PostBus Switzerland services with RhB stations either in Scuol or any other stop further up the main valley. Regular bus services connects Scuol also via Martina and the Austrian Pfunds with the Landeck-Zams in the Tyrolian Upper Inn Valley (German: (Tiroler) Oberinntal). Here you meet the main railway line between Zürich – Innsbruck – Salzburg – Vienna. PostBus Switzerland also connects the main valley from Zernez with the Val Müstair or even further to the South-Tyrolian Mals, and by an Italian bus service back to the Lower Engadine via Martina, or vice versa.

== Demographics ==
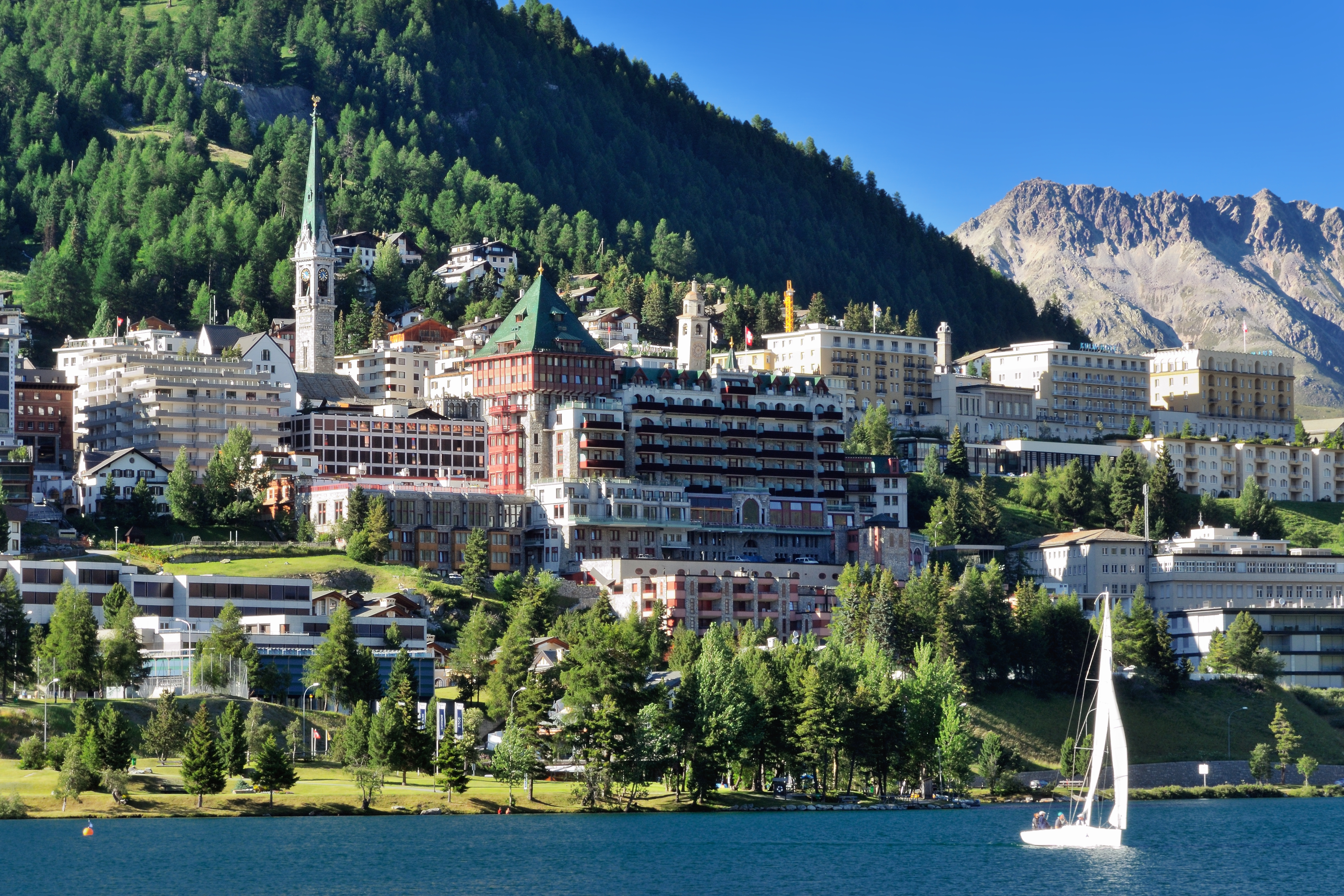
St. Moritz is the largest town in Engadine

In the Upper Engadine, as a result of the strong influx of people related to tourism, mainly from outside of Switzerland (mainly from Italy, Austria, Germany), the number of German and Italian speakers outnumber Romansh speakers, and in the heavily touristed village of St. Moritz there are few Romansh speakers to be found. In the Lower Engadine, Romansch is still the most widely spoken language, but almost all of the people also speak the Grisonian Swiss German and Swiss Standard German as a second and third language. Most place signs in both the Upper and Lower Engadine show both languages (German/Italian and Romansh), e.g. St. Moritz - San Murezzan, Sils - Segl, Celerina - Schlarigna.

== Lakes ==
Lake	Area	Elevation
Lake Sils	4.1 km^{2}	1797 m
Lake Silvaplana	2.7 km^{2}	1791 m
Lake Champfèr		
Lake St. Moritz	0.78 km^{2}	1768 m

== Tourism ==
=== History of tourism ===
St. Moritz is a major resort of the Alps. Tourism started in the 19th century. It is also one of the oldest winter sport resorts in the world, being popular in winter since 1864.

In the Lower Engadine tourism became important in 1913 with the opening of the train station in Scuol, since then it has been well connected to the rest of Switzerland. In 1369 the mineral sources in Scuol were mentioned for the first time but the health benefits were known even earlier. The most important tourism attraction is the Bogn Engiadina Scuol inaugurated in 1993. With 80 km of courses, the inauguration of the Motta Naluns ski area in 1956 was another important date in the history of tourism in Scuol.

Further, the opening of the Vereina tunnel in 1999 reduced the trip length from Zürich to Scuol considerably so now it is possible to do a one-day trip to Scuol, visit the Bogn Engiadina and return in the evening.

== Traditions ==
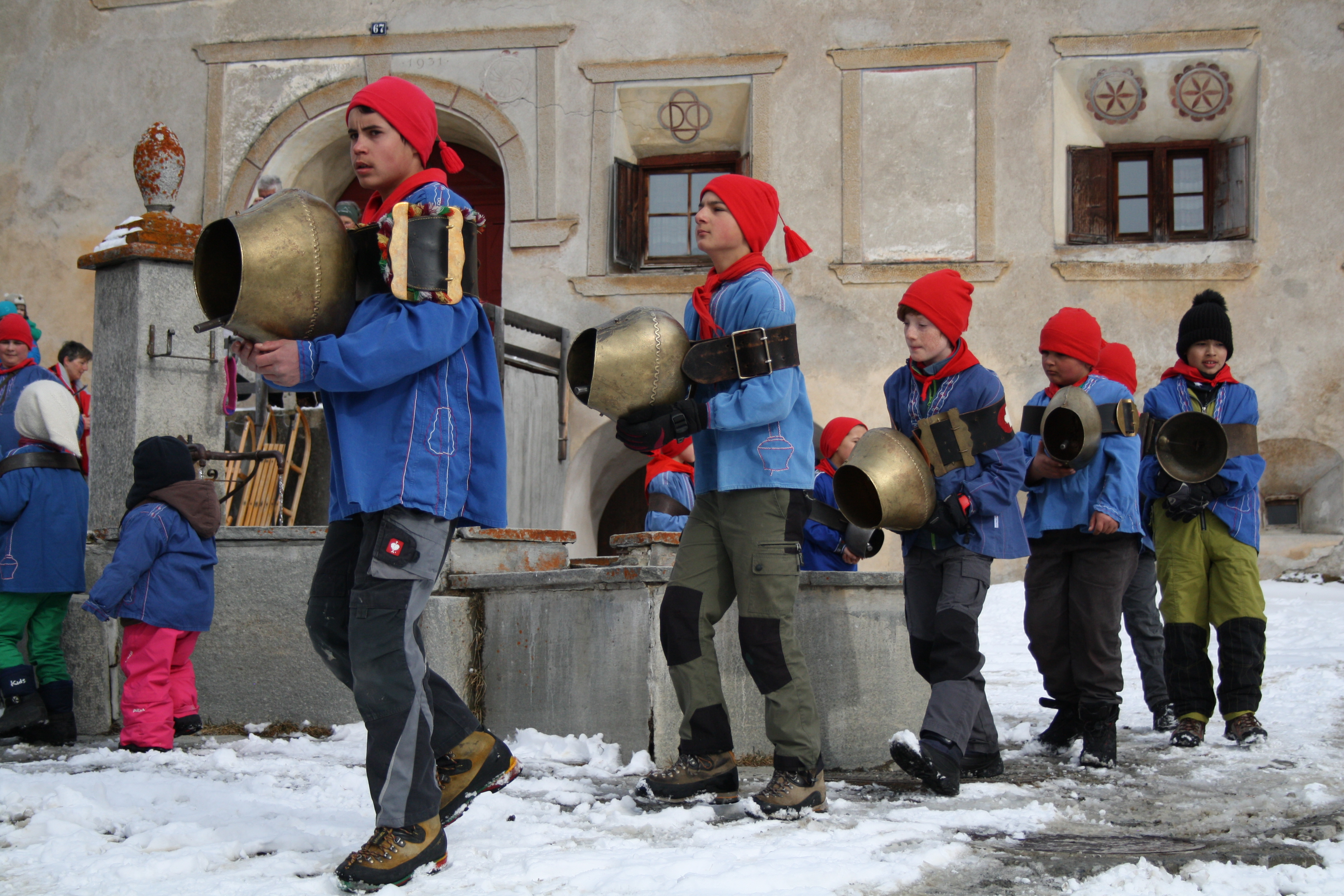
Chalandamarz in Guarda

Though no one knows how far back it dates, the traditional winter horse-drawn sleigh ride takes place every winter. Many of the sleighs once came from local families who have been living in the area over many generations. The fact that their carriages go as far back as they do, helps to identify the tradition as one that has possibly been around for centuries.

The Schlittéda ("sleigh ride"; German: Schlittenfahrt) is composed of many sleighs, each carrying a young woman and a young man paired up by a lottery, and one sleigh carrying a musician or group of musicians to serenade the riders and the accompanying audience.

Typical black and red Engadine dress is used by the townspeople and the horses are decorated with plumage and trimmings in addition to the bells. Throughout the day-long ride, stops, that have been planned ahead of time, are made where eating, dancing, and drinking occur. At the end of the night, the young woman's companion (who had been selected by lottery) is invited to her home for more celebratory dining.

== Local cuisine ==
This regional cuisine is characterised by the use of selected local spices which have the rare ability to infuse a dish with a certain Engadine taste. In general, the basic ingredients of the dishes are quite elementary, using potatoes and meat because the Engadine farmers of former times had a hard daily working life. Additionally, expensive ingredients were not available to the mainly poor farmers. Because of the local way of preparation, dishes vary from kitchen to kitchen and village to village.

One of the most well-known foods associated to this region is the Bündner Nusstorte, also known as Engadiner Nusstorte, which is a traditional sweet, caramelised nut-filled pastry (generally walnut).

== Bibliography ==
- Karsten Plöger: Das Engadin. Biografie einer Landschaft. Hier und Jetzt Verlag, Zürich 2023, ISBN 978-3-03919-579-4.
- Karsten Plöger: The Engadine. Biography of a Landscape. Hier und Jetzt Verlag, Zürich 2023, ISBN 978-3-03919-603-6.
- Poltéra, Maggie. "Das Kochbuch aus Graubünden", Verlag Wolfgang Hölker GmbH 1979.
