= Lägh dal Lunghin =

Lake in Switzerland

- Lunghinsee (German); Lägh dal Lunghin (Romansh)
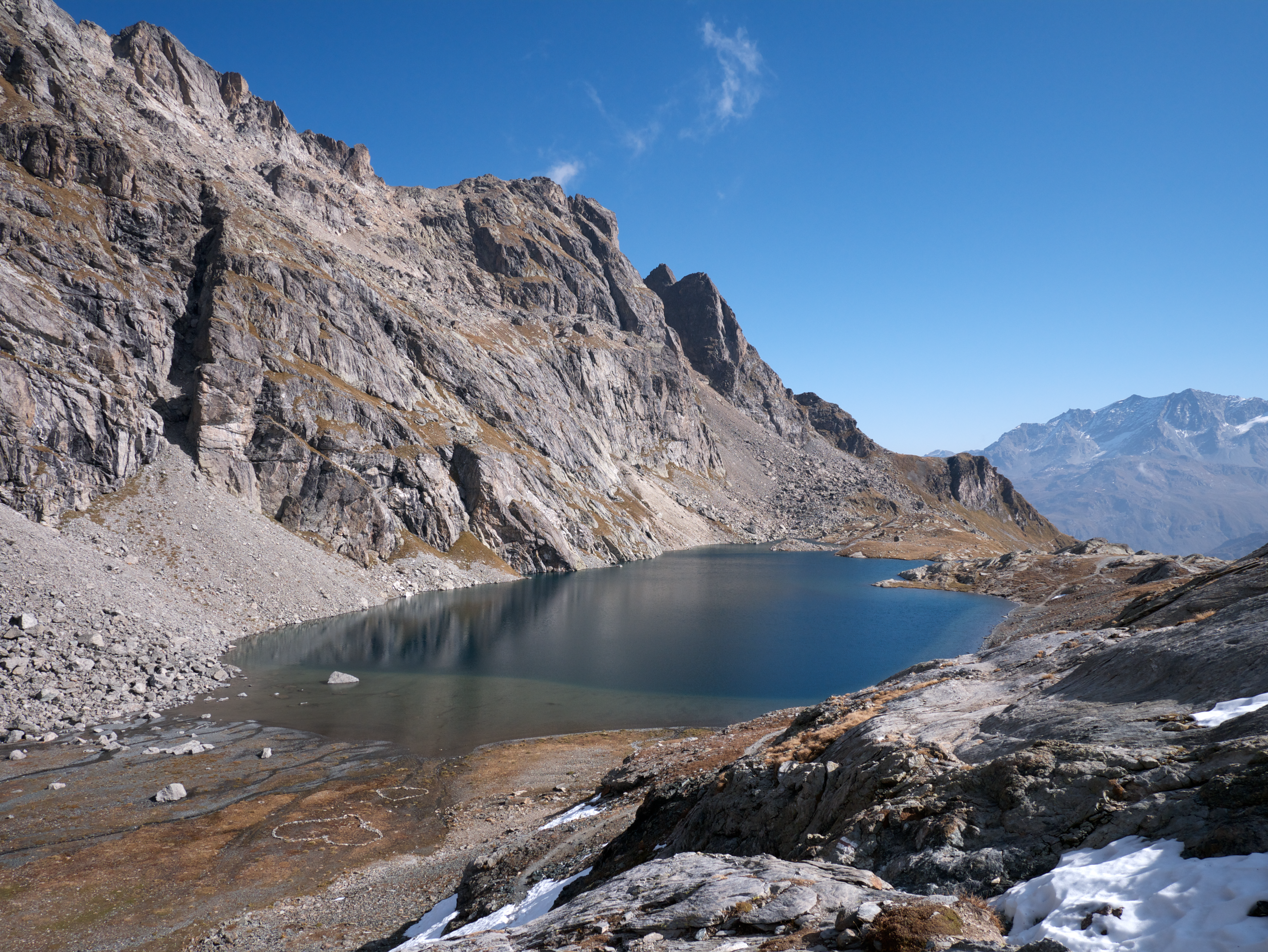
- Lägh dal Lunghin

- Location within Canton of Graubünden Location within Switzerland Location within Alps
- Interactive map of Lägh dal Lunghin
- Location: Engadin, Grisons
- Coordinates: 46°25′02″N 9°40′30″E
- Basin countries: Switzerland
- Average depth: 9.2 m (30 ft)
- Surface elevation: 2,484 m (8,150 ft)
- Frozen: November - July (ice)

Lägh dal Lunghin (German: Lunghinsee) is a lake at an elevation of 2484 m, below the peak of Piz Lunghin, in the Graubünden, Switzerland. It is considered the source of the Inn River.

== See also ==
- List of mountain lakes of Switzerland
