= Lunghin Pass =

Mountain pass in Graubünden, Switzerland

Coordinates: 46°24′48.71″N 9°39′48.53″E

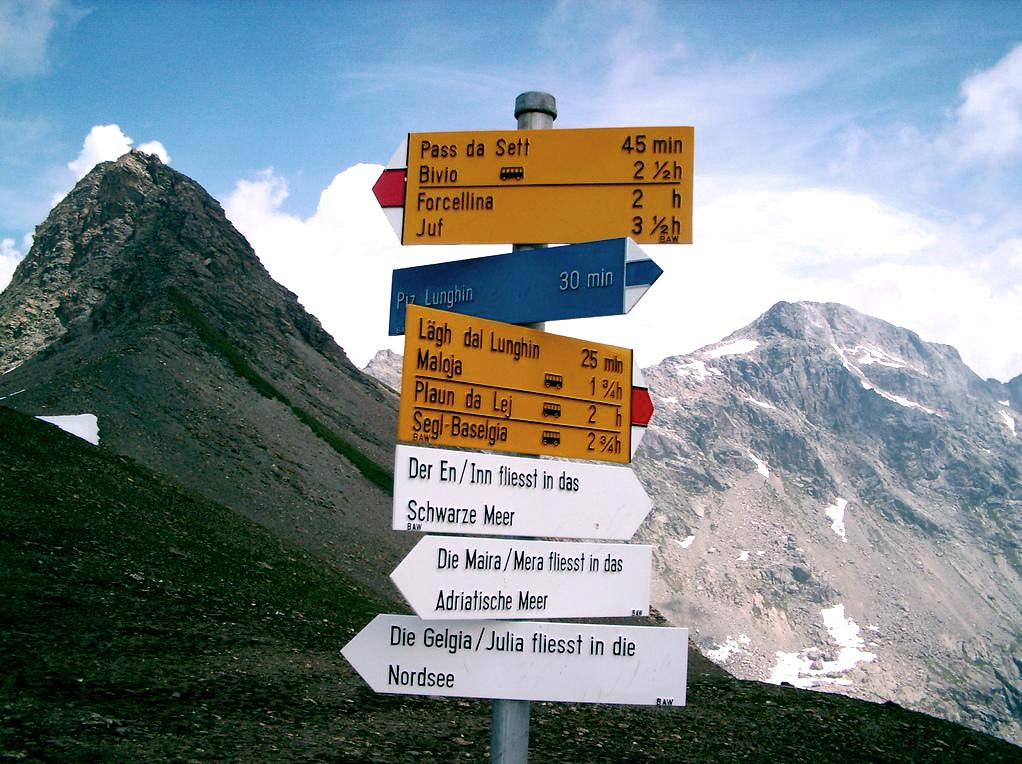
Lunghin Pass

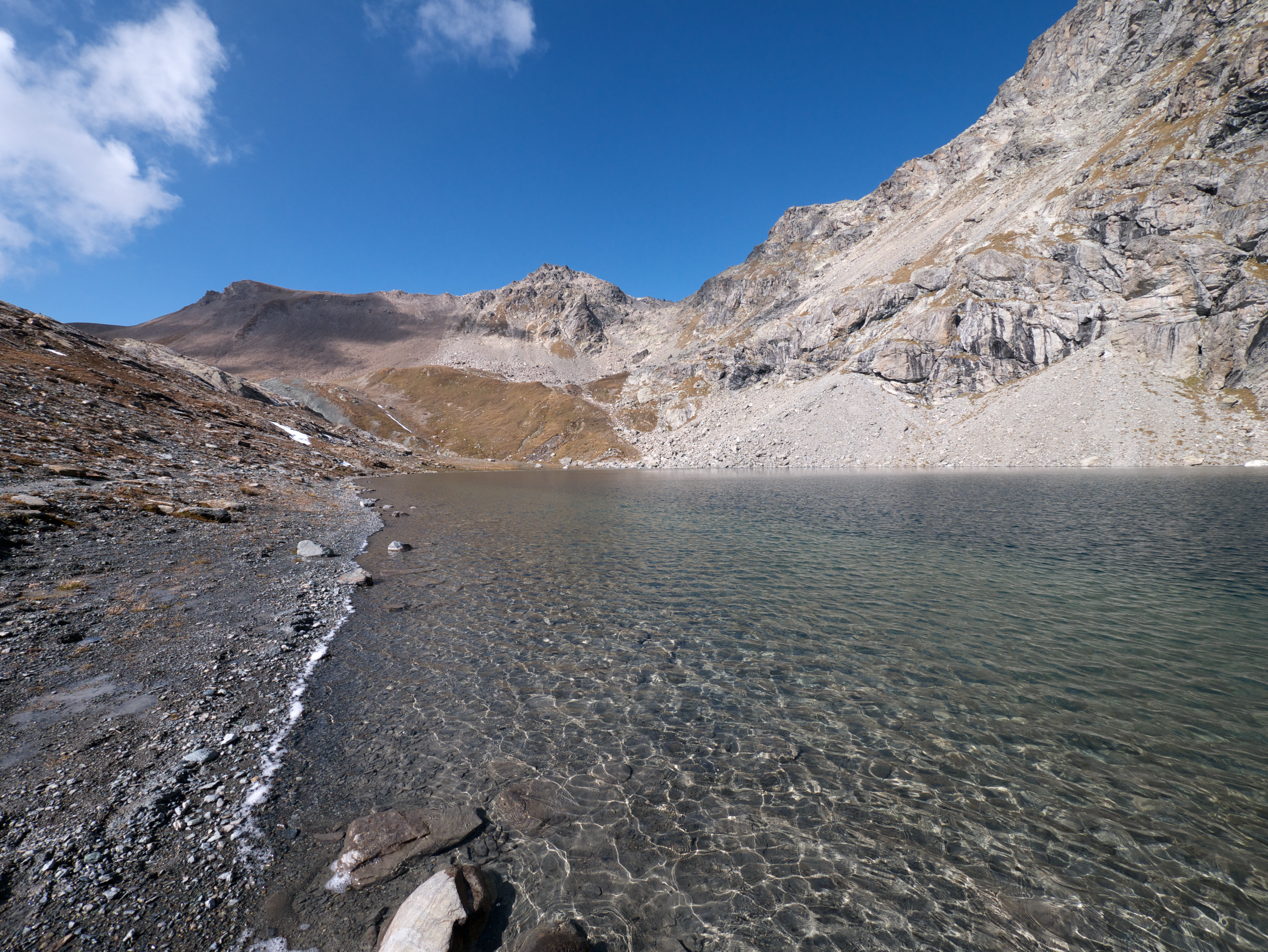
Lunghin Pass seen from Lake Lunghin

Lunghin Pass is a mountain pass (2645 m) and a triple watershed near Piz Lunghin in the Swiss canton of Graubünden. The water running off the pass heads toward the North Sea via the Rhine, Mediterranean Sea via the Po, or Black Sea via the Danube.

Lunghin is said to go back to the Italian surname Longhini.
