= Putèr =

Southeastern variety of the Romansh language

- puter
- Pronunciation: [puˈteːr]
- Native to: Engadin in Switzerland
- Language family: Indo-European: Italic; Latino-Faliscan; Romance; Italo-Western; Western Romance; Gallo-Romance; Rhaeto-Romance or Gallo-Rhaetian; Romansh; Putèr
- Writing system: Latin script

Language codes
- ISO 639-3: –
- Glottolog: uppe1396
- IETF: rm-puter

Puter (also spelled Putèr; Romansh: puter [puˈteːr]) is a variety of Romansh spoken in the Engadin valley in Graubünden, which is in the southeastern part of Switzerland. It is spoken in the central northwestern end of the valley between S-chanf and St. Moritz, as well as in the region of the Bernina Pass. Romansh was named by 5,497 people within the upper Engadine valley (30%) as a habitually spoken language in the census of 2000, which probably corresponds roughly to the total number of speakers. The term is probably originally a nickname derived from put 'porridge', meaning 'porridge-eaters'.

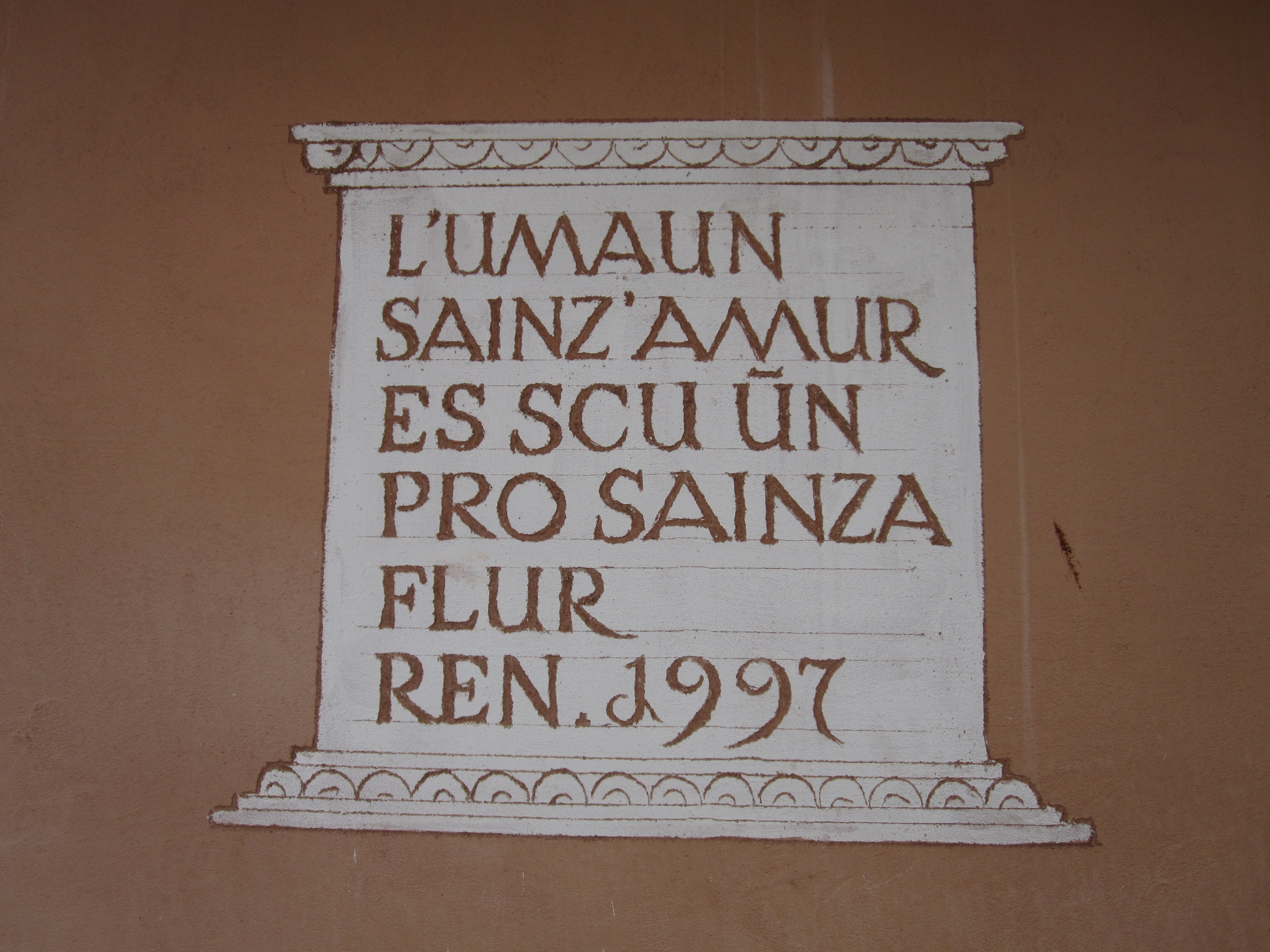
Sgraffito on a house in Samedan, translation: A human without love is like a meadow without flowers

== Classification ==
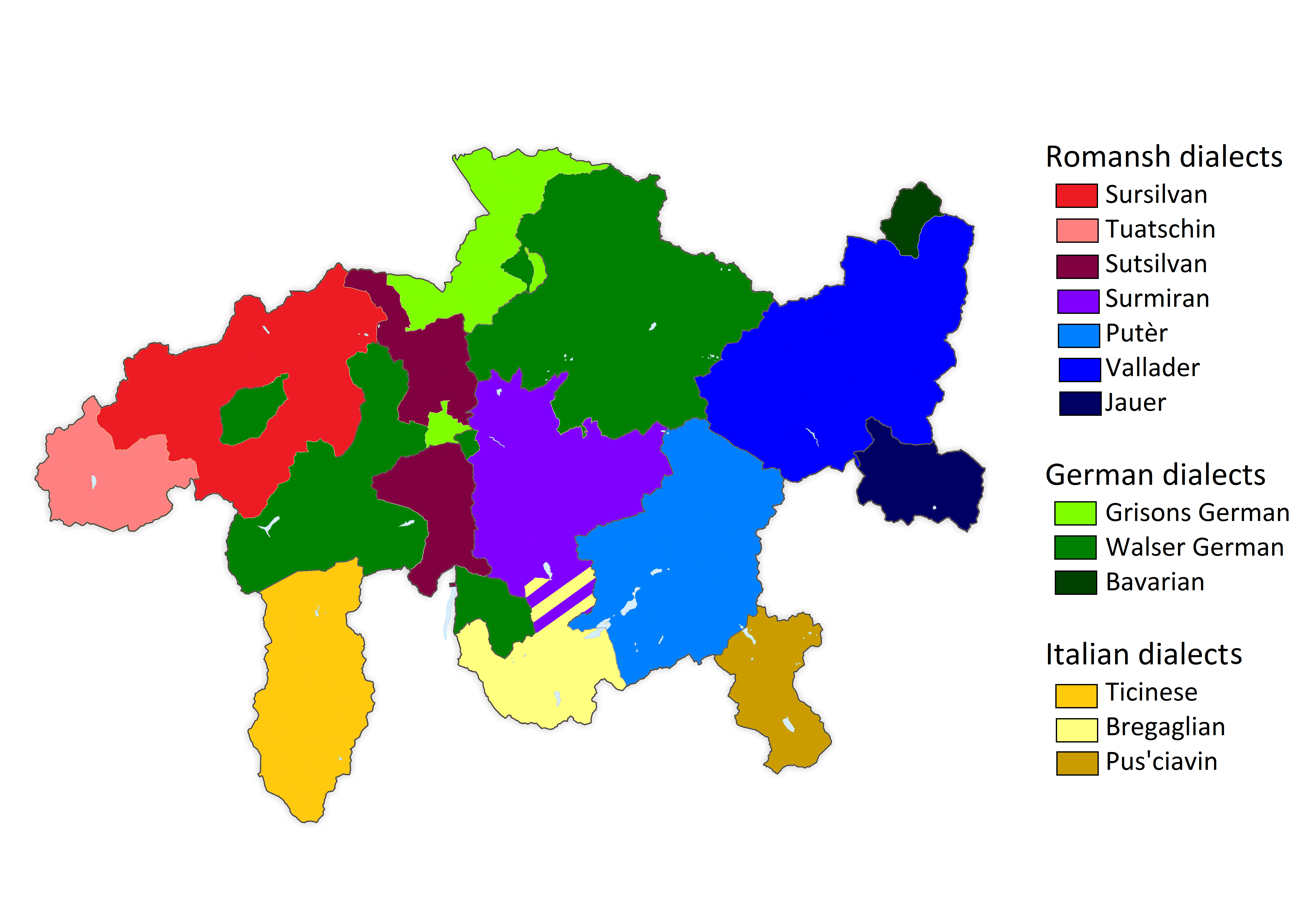
Historical distribution of the dialects of Romansh, German, and Italian in Graubünden: Sursilvan Tuatschin Sutsilvan Surmiran Putèr Vallader Jauer

Puter and Vallader are sometimes referred to as one specific variety known as Ladin, as they have retained this word to mean Romansh. However, the term Ladin is primarily associated with the closely related language in Italy's Dolomite mountains also known as Ladin. Puter and Vallader are distinguished from the other Romansh dialects among other things by the retention of the rounded front vowels /y/ and /ø/ (written ü and ö), which have been derounded to /i/ and /e/ in the other dialects. Compare Putèr mür to Sursilvan mir ‘wall’ and Putèr chaschöl to Sursilvan caschiel 'cheese'.

Each village between S-chanf and St. Moritz has a slightly different accent, although the written form remains the same.

== Literary development ==
Gian Travers wrote the first surviving work in Romansh, the Chianzun dalla guerra dagl Chiaste da Müs, in the Putèr dialect. This epic poem, written in 1527, describes the first Musso war, in which Travers himself had taken part.

There is an individual dictionary for this dialect, as well as texts dealing with its grammar.

== Sample ==
The fable The Fox and the Crow by Jean de La Fontaine in Putèr Romansh, as well as a translation into English, the similar-looking but noticeably different-sounding dialect Vallader, and Rumantsch Grischun.

| Vallader audio | Putèr audio | Rumantsch Grischun audio | Translation |
|---|---|---|---|
| La vuolp d'eira darcheu üna jada fomantada. Qua ha'la vis sün ün pin ün corv chi tgnaiva ün toc chaschöl in seis pical. Quai am gustess, ha'la pensà, ed ha clomà al corv: «Che bel cha tü est! Scha teis chant es uschè bel sco tia apparentscha, lura est tü il plü bel utschè da tuots». | La vuolp d’eira darcho üna vouta famanteda. Co ho'la vis sün ün pin ün corv chi tgnaiva ün töch chaschöl in sieu pical. Que am gustess, ho'la penso, ed ho clamo al corv: «Che bel cha tü est! Scha tieu chaunt es uschè bel scu tia apparentscha, alura est tü il pü bel utschè da tuots». | La vulp era puspè ina giada fomentada. Qua ha ella vis sin in pign in corv che tegneva in toc chaschiel en ses pichel. Quai ma gustass, ha ella pensà, ed ha clamà al corv: «Tge bel che ti es! Sche tes chant è uschè bel sco tia parita, lur es ti il pli bel utschè da tuts». | The fox was hungry yet again. There he saw a raven upon a fir holding a piece of cheese in its beak. This I would like, he thought, and shouted at the raven: "You are so beautiful! If your singing is as beautiful as your looks, then you are the most beautiful of all birds.". |
