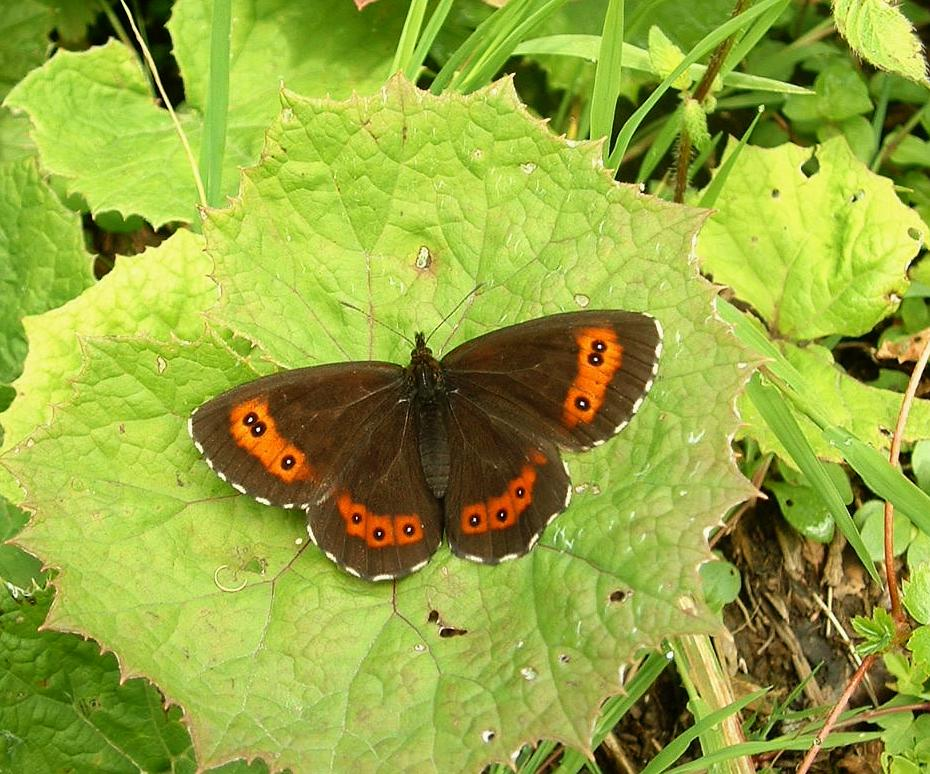
- Arran brown (type species)

Scientific classification
- Kingdom: Animalia
- Phylum: Arthropoda
- Clade: Pancrustacea
- Class: Insecta
- Order: Lepidoptera
- Family: Nymphalidae
- Subtribe: Erebiina
- Genus: Erebia; Dalman, 1816

Type species
- Papilio ligea Linnaeus, 1758

Diversity
- Around 100 species

Synonyms
- Atercoloratus Bang-Haas, 1938; Epigea Hübner, [1819] Gorgo Hübner, [1819] Marica Hübner, [1819] Medusia Verity, 1953; Phorcis Hübner, [1819] Simplicia Verity, 1953 (non Guenée, 1854: preoccupied); Syngea Hübner, [1819] Triariia Verity, 1953; Truncaefalcia Verity, 1953

= Erebia =

Genus of insects (brush-footed butterflies)

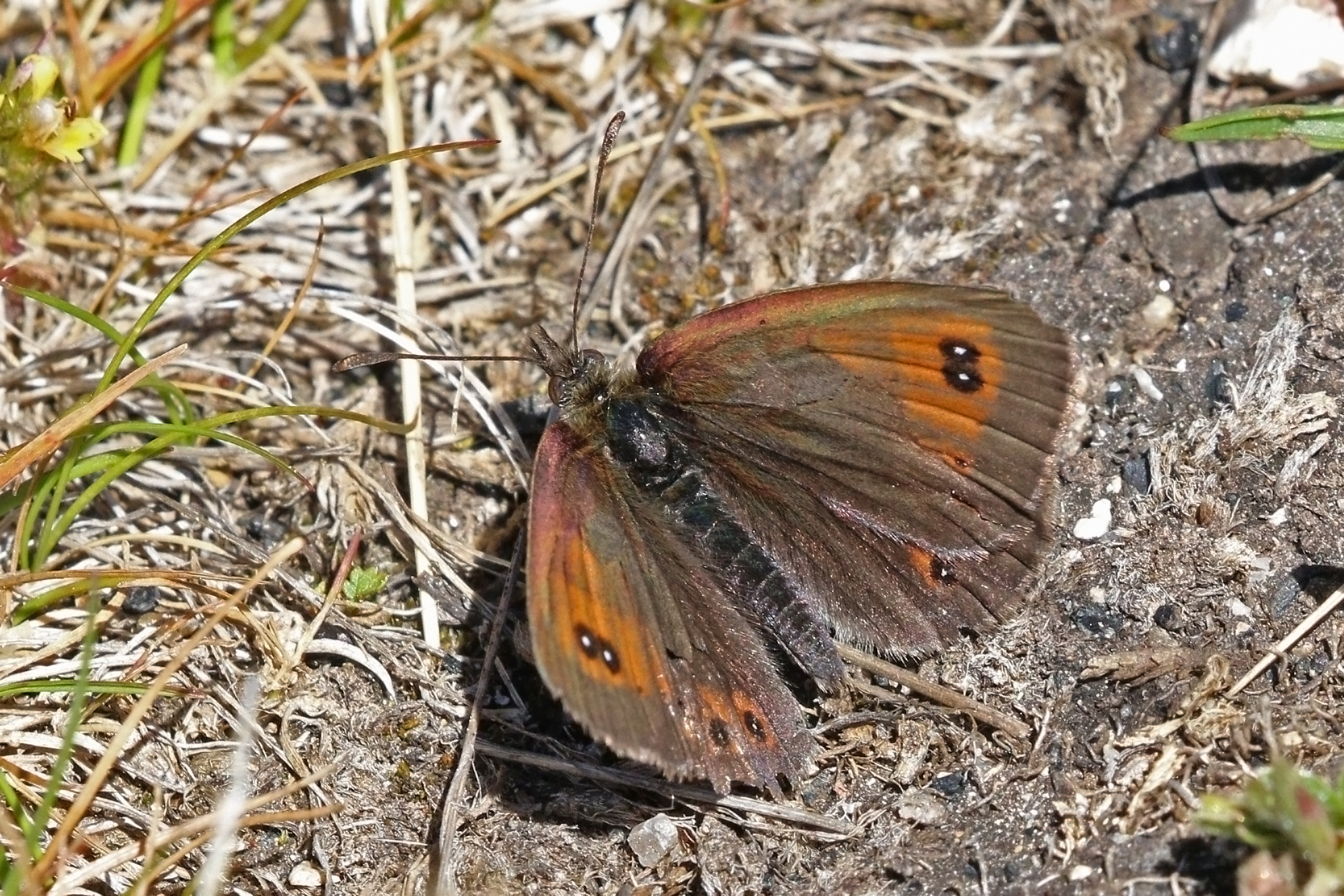
male Ottoman brassy ringlet E. ottomana

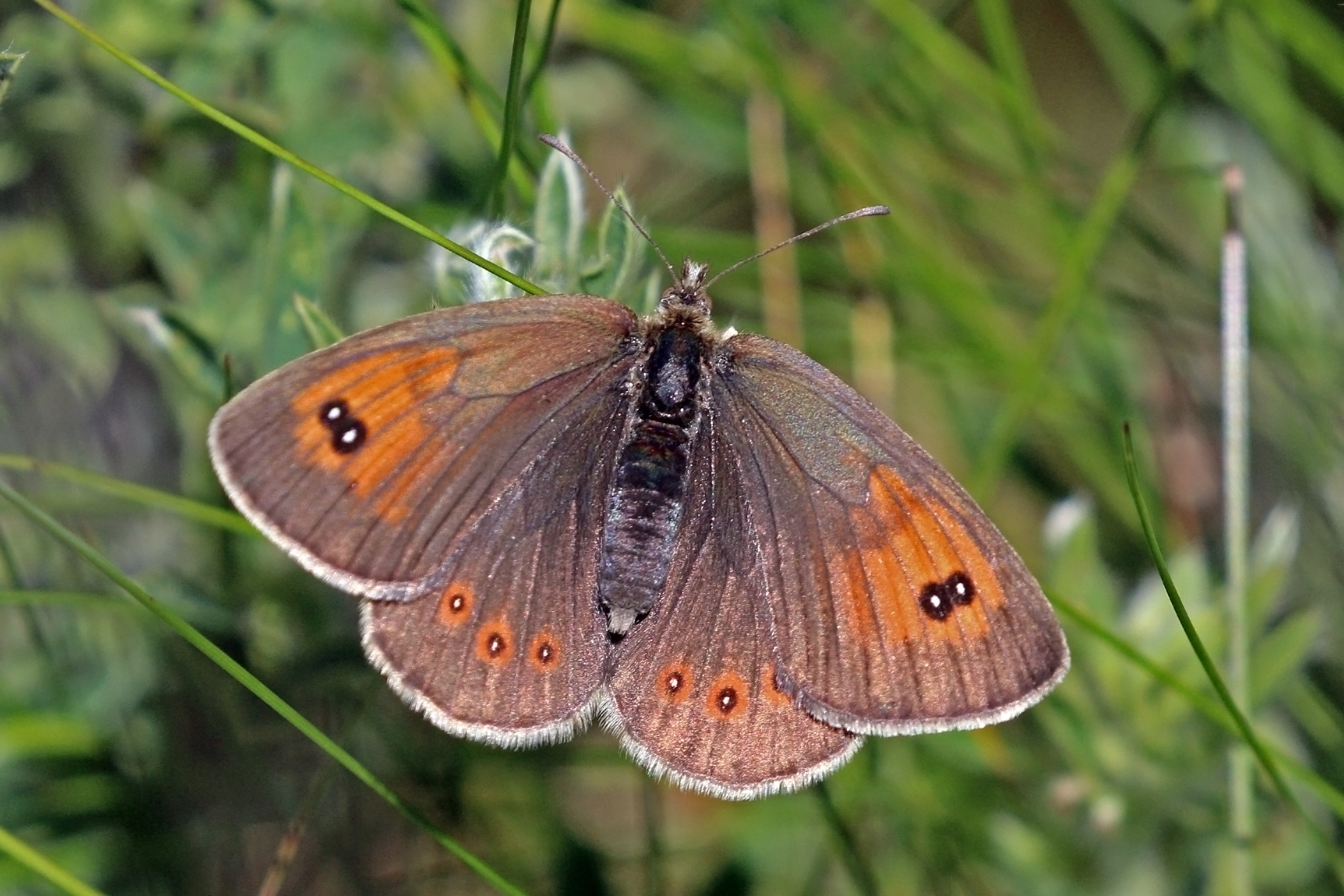
female Ottoman brassy ringlet E. ottomana

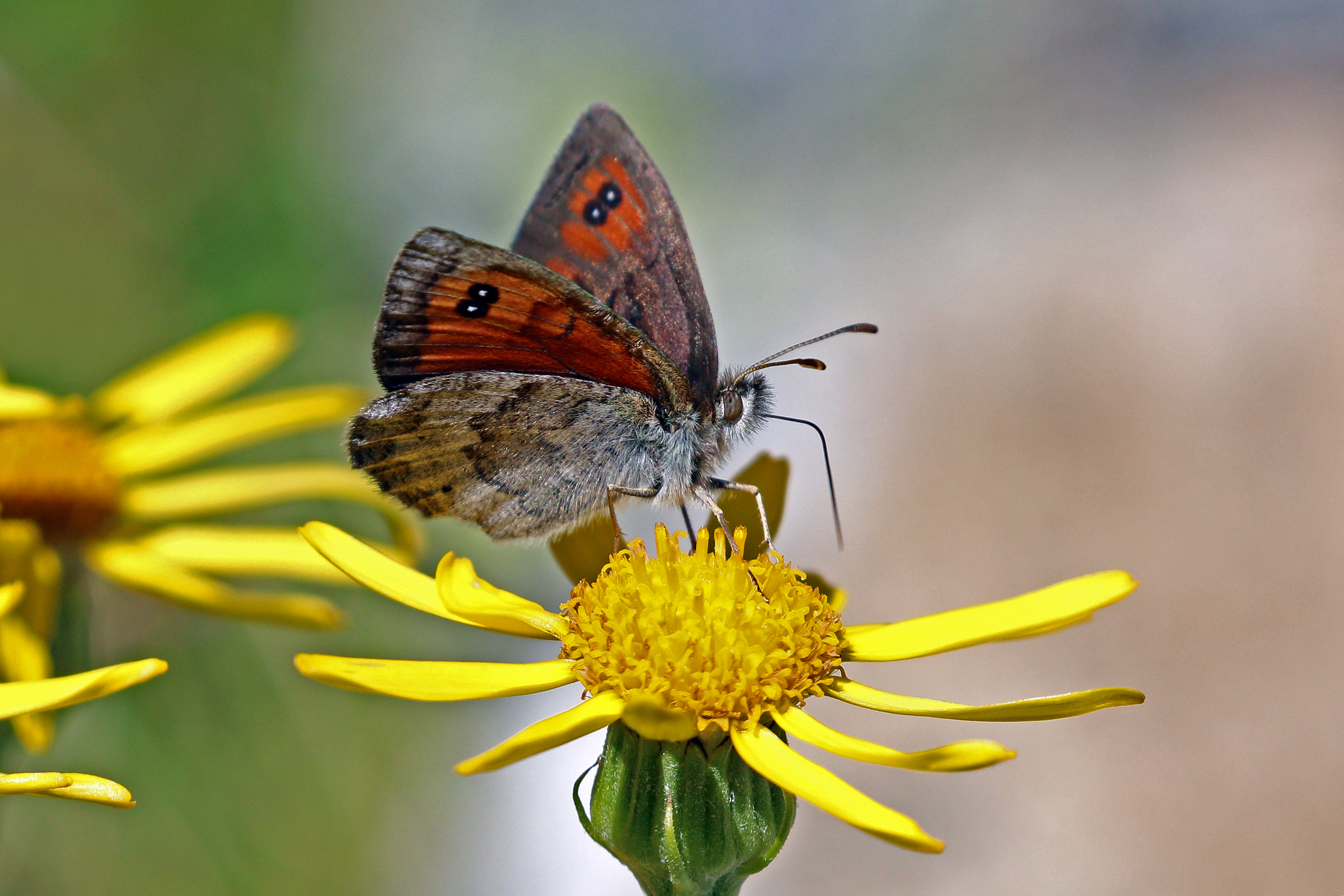
female Ottoman brassy ringlet E. ottomana

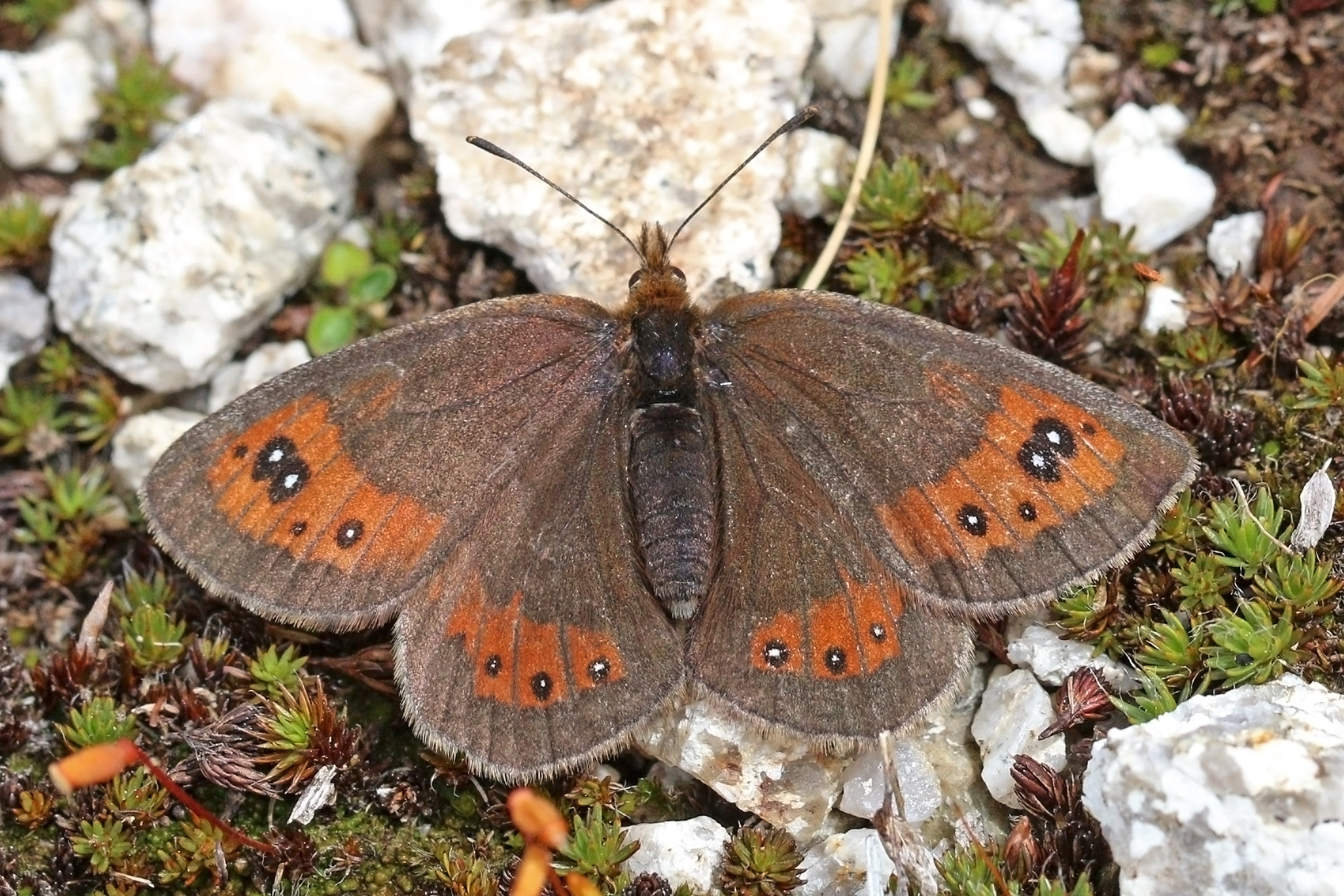
Nicholl's ringlet (E. rhodopensis)

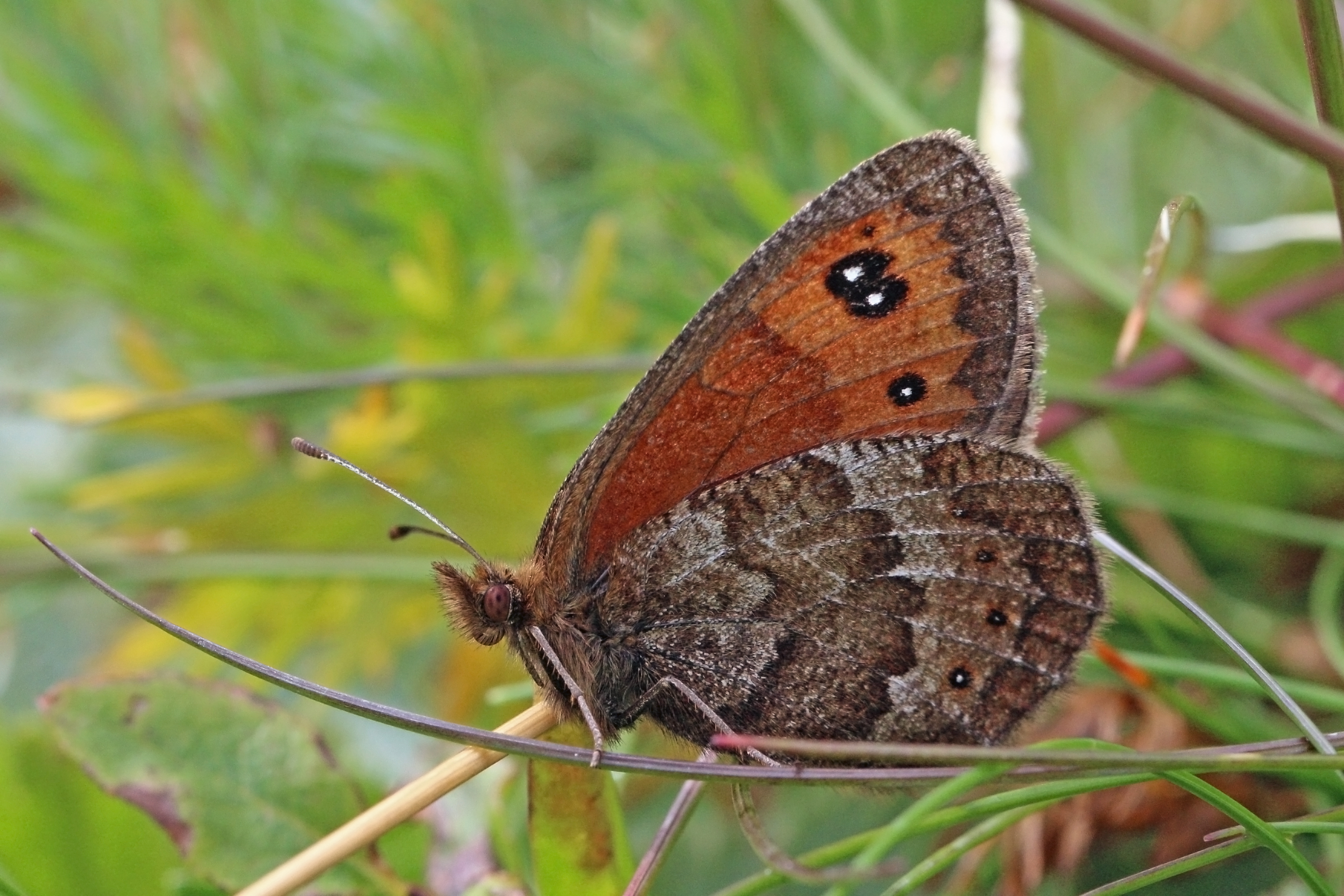
Nicholl's ringlet (E. rhodopensis)

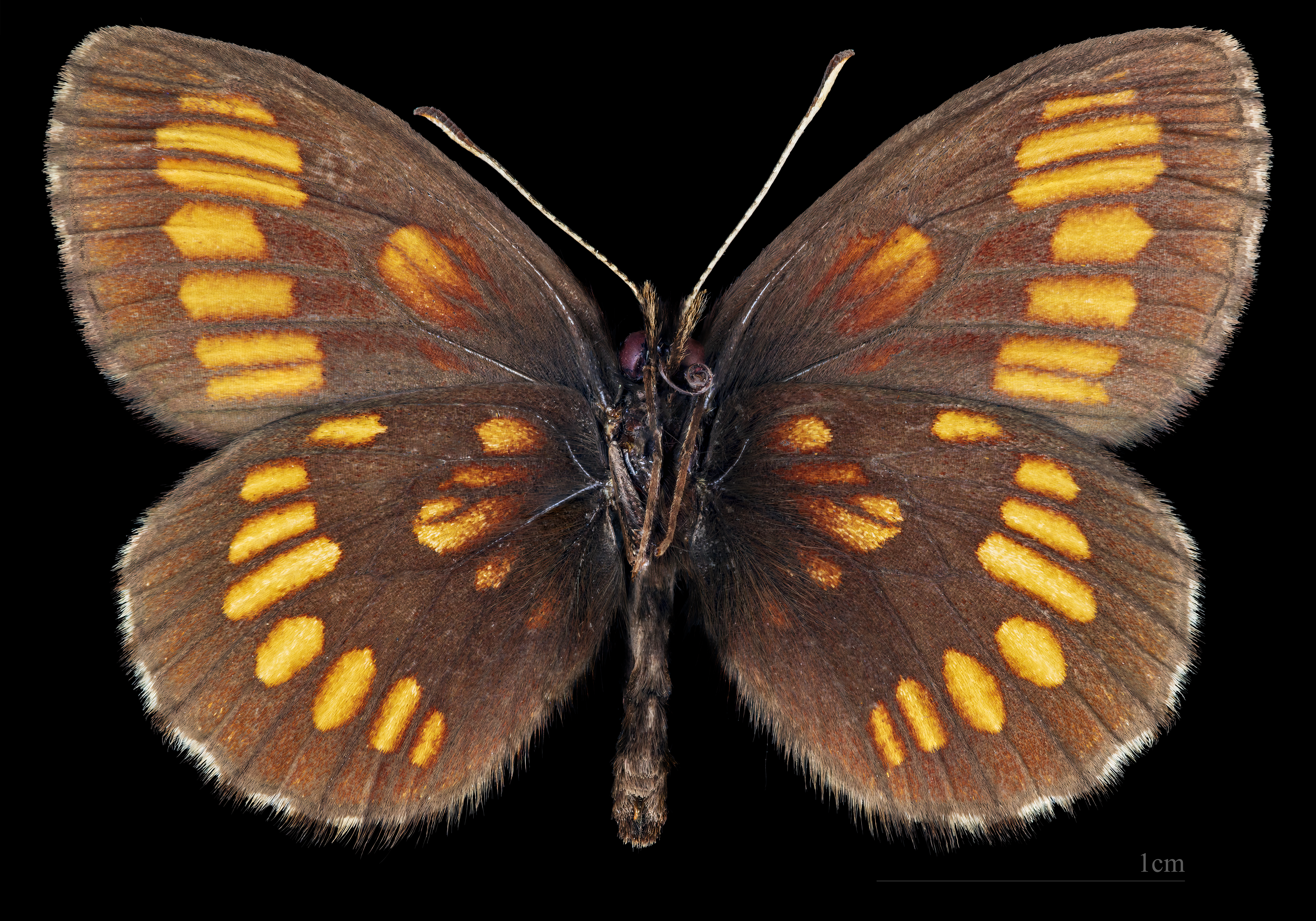
E. theano

Erebia is a Holarctic genus of brush-footed butterflies, family Nymphalidae. Most of the about 90–100 species (see also below) are dark brown or black in color, with reddish-brown to orange or more rarely yellowish wing blotches or bands. These usually bear black spots within, which sometimes have white center spots.

This genus has found it easy to adapt to arid and especially cold conditions. Most of its members are associated with high-altitude lands, forest clearings or high latitude and tundra. Erebia species are frequent in the Alps, Rocky Mountains, subarctic and even Arctic regions, and the cooler parts of Central Asia. In fact, the North American term for these butterflies is alpines. Palearctic species are collectively known as ringlets or arguses. However, none of these terms is used exclusively for this genus.

== Taxonomy and systematics ==
The genus Erebia was erected by Johan Wilhelm Dalman in 1816. As type species, the Arran brown—described as Papilio ligea by Carl Linnaeus in 1758—was chosen. This is a very complex genus with over 1300 taxa, but a massive proportion of these are junior synonyms. Some of the available names are listed by Vladimir Lukhtanov. A fully comprehensive taxonomic checklist (i.e., without discussing synonymy and relationships) was published in 2008.

Only three years after the genus' inception, the known species were reviewed by Jacob Hübner. He established no less than five new genera for a fraction of what would eventually be named as "species" of Erebia. But things hardly improved as more and more of the diversity of these butterflies came to note. In Europe, a large number of Erebia taxa was described from the Alps. In the 19th and early 20th century the Alps were a popular destination for butterfly collectors and specimens of Alpine butterflies were very profitable for dealers. The dealers, mostly German, not only sold specimens, but were entomologists, entomological book dealers, entomological authors and publishers. Examples are Fritz Rühl, Alexander Heyne, Otto Staudinger, Andreas and Otto Bang-Haas and, in Paris, Achille and Émile Deyrolle.

This, together with the then-popular, even obsessive study of variation by entomologists – examples are James William Tutt, George Wheeler, Felix Bryk and Brisbane Charles Somerville Warren – led to very many names being applied to what may be or much more likely may not be biological species or subspecies. A further problem is the use of the term "variety". Authors of that time used this for an individual variant, a group of individuals morphologically but not otherwise related, seasonal forms, temperature-related forms, or geographic races; it was later usually taken to mean the last subspecies though this is often suspected to have been premature.

Eventually, it became common to arrange supposed species and subspecies to "species groups" (not superspecies, but an informal phenetic arrangement) as pioneered by B.C.S. Warren, and attempt to resolve their true nature by and by. As molecular phylogenetic studies add to the available data, it is becoming clear that most "varieties" that have at least been commonly considered subspecies in the latter 20th century are indeed lineages distinct enough to warrant some formal degree of recognition. Another result of recent research is confirmation of the theory that this genus contains many glacial relict taxa, e.g., in the brassy ringlet group (E. tyndarus and similar species).

The number of currently recognized Erebia species is given variously around 90-100, as developments happen so fast that it is hard for authors to remain up to date regarding the newest changes.

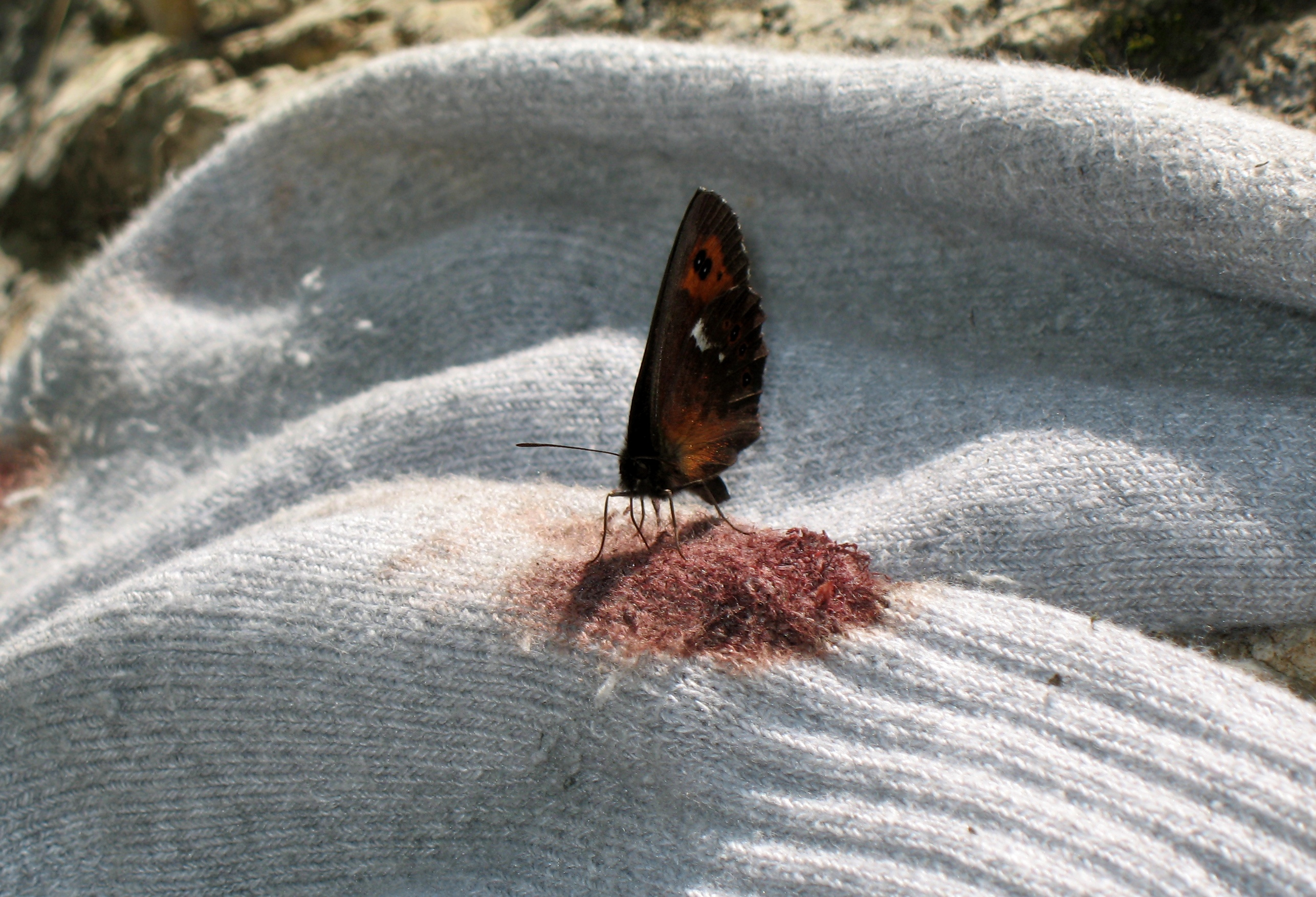
Erebia ligea consuming fresh blood off a sock

Erebia, like some other genera of butterflies, has been known to consume blood.

=== Species list ===
As of early 2008, the following good species and some rather distinct subspecies are listed:

- Erebia aethiopella (Hoffmannsegg, 1806) – false Mnestra ringlet
- Erebia aethiops (Esper, 1777) – Scotch argus
- Erebia ajanensis Ménétriés, 1857
- Erebia alberganus (Prunner, 1798) – almond ringlet or almond-eyed ringlet
- Erebia alcmena Grum-Grshimailo, 1891 Tibet, West China, Japan
- Erebia alini (Bang-Haas, 1937) (disputed) Manchuria
- Erebia anyuica Kurenzov, 1966 – scree alpine
- Erebia arctica R.Poppius, 1906 Kanin Peninsula, Arkhangelsk Region
- Erebia atramentaria O.Bang-Haas, 1927 China
- Erebia calcaria Lorković, 1949 – Lorkovic's brassy ringlet
- Erebia callias Edwards, 1871
  - Erebia (callias) altajana Staudinger, 1901
  - Erebia (callias) callias – Colorado alpine
  - Erebia (callias) sibirica Staudinger, 1881
  - Erebia (callias) simulata Warren, 1933
- Erebia cassioides (Reiner & Hohenwarth, 1792) – common brassy ringlet
  - Erebia (cassioides) arvernensis Oberthür 1908 – western brassy ringlet
  - Erebia (cassioides) carmenta Fruhstorfer, 1907 – western brassy ringlet
  - Erebia (cassioides) macedonica Buresch, 1918
- Erebia christi Rätzer, 1890 – Raetzer's ringlet
- Erebia claudina (Borkhausen, 1789) – white speck ringlet
- Erebia cyclopius (Eversmann, 1844)
- Erebia dabanensis Erschoff, 1871
- Erebia disa (Thunberg, 1791) – Arctic ringlet or disa alpine
- Erebia discoidalis Kirby, 1837 – red-disked alpine
- Erebia dromulus Staudinger, 1901 Caucasus to North Iran, Turkey, Armenia
- Erebia edda Ménétriés, 1851
- Erebia embla (Thunberg, 1791) – Lapland ringlet
- Erebia epiphron (Knoch, 1783) – mountain ringlet or small mountain ringlet
- Erebia epipsodea Butler, 1868 – common alpine
- Erebia epistygne (Hübner, 1819) – spring ringlet
- Erebia erinnyn Warren, 1932 Sayan, Transbaikala
- Erebia eriphyle (Freyer, 1836) – eriphyle ringlet
- Erebia eugenia Churkin, 2000 Tian-Shan
- Erebia euryale (Esper, 1805) – large ringlet
- Erebia fasciata Butler, 1868 – banded alpine
- Erebia flavofasciata Heyne, 1895 – yellow-banded ringlet
- Erebia fletcheri Elwes, 1899
- Erebia gorge (Esper, 1805) – silky ringlet
- Erebia gorgone – Gavarnie ringlet
- Erebia graucasica Jachontov, 1909 Caucasus
- Erebia haberhaueri Staudinger, 1881 Kazakhstan
- Erebia hewitsoni Lederer, 1864 Turkey, Iran, Transcausia, Armenia
- Erebia hispania Butler, 1868 – Spanish brassy ringlet
- Erebia inuitica Wyatt, 1966 (disputed)
- Erebia iranica Grum-Grshimailo, 1895
- Erebia jeniseiensis Trybom, 1877
- Erebia kalmuka Alphéraky, 1881 Tian-Shan
- Erebia kefersteinii (Eversmann, 1851)
- Erebia kindermanni Staudinger, 1881
- Erebia kozhantshikovi Sheljuzhko, 1925 Transbaikalia, Chukot Peninsula, Mongolia
- Erebia lafontainei (Troubridge & Philip, 1983) – reddish alpine
- Erebia lefebvrei (Boisduval, [1828]) – Lefèbvre's ringlet
- Erebia ligea (Linnaeus, 1758) – Arran brown
- Erebia mackinleyensis (Gunder, 1932) – Mt. McKinley alpine
- Erebia magdalena Strecker, 1880 – Magdalena alpine
- Erebia mancinus Doubleday, [1849] – taiga alpine
- Erebia manto ([Schiffermüller], 1775) – yellow-spotted ringlet
- Erebia maurisius Lukhtanov & Lukhtanov, 1994 (might be Erebia brimo (Böber, 1809))
- Erebia medusa (Denis & Schiffermüller, 1975) – woodland ringlet
  - Erebia medusa polaris Staudinger, 1871 – Arctic woodland ringlet
- Erebia melampus (Fuessli, 1775) – lesser mountain ringlet
- Erebia melancholica Herrich-Schäffer, [1846] Asia Minor, Caucasus, Transcaucasia
- Erebia melas (Herbst, 1796) – black ringlet
- Erebia meolans (Prunner, 1798) – Piedmont ringlet
- Erebia meta Staudinger, 1886
- Erebia mopsos Staudinger, 1886 synonym of meta
- Erebia mnestra (Hübner, [1803-1804]) – Mnestra's ringlet
- Erebia montana (de Prunner, 1798) – marbled ringlet
- Erebia neoridas (Boisduval, [1828]) – autumn ringlet
- Erebia neriene (Böber, 1809)
- Erebia niphonica Janson, 1877
- Erebia nivalis Lorković & Lesse, 1954 – de Lesse's brassy ringlet
- Erebia occulta Roos & Kimmich, 1983 – Eskimo alpine Alaska, Siberia, Russian Far East
- Erebia ocnus (Eversmann, 1843) Dzungarian Alatau, Tian-shan
- Erebia oeme (Hübner, [1803-1804]) – bright-eyed ringlet
- Erebia orientalis Elwes, 1900 Bulgaria
- Erebia ottomana Herrich-Schäffer, [1851] – Ottoman brassy ringlet
  - Erebia (ottomana) benacensis Warren, 1933
- Erebia palarica Chapman, 1905 – Chapman's ringlet Cantabria, Spain
- Erebia pandrose (Borkhausen, 1788) – dewy ringlet
- Erebia pawlowskii Ménétriés, 1859 – yellow-dotted alpine or Theano alpine
- Erebia pharte (Hübner, [1803-1804]) – blind ringlet
- Erebia pluto (de Prunner, 1798) – sooty ringlet
- Erebia pawlowskii Ménétriés, 1859 – yellow-dotted alpine or Theano alpine
- Erebia progne Grum-Grshimailo, 1890 Pamir-Alay mountain system
- Erebia pronoe (Esper, 1780) – water ringlet
- Erebia radians Staudinger, 1886 Trans-Alay Range, Tian-shan
- Erebia rhodopensis Nicholl, 1900 - Nicholl's ringlet
- Erebia rondoui Oberthür 1908 (previously in E. cassioides)
- Erebia rossii (Curtis, 1835) – Arctic–alpine or Ross's alpine
- Erebia rurigena (disputed) Tat-sien-lu [Sichuan, China]
- Erebia sachaensis Dubatolov, 1992 Russian Far East
- Erebia scipio Boisduval, 1832 – larche ringlet
- Erebia serotina Descimon & de Lesse, 1953 – Descimon's ringlet Pyrenees
- Erebia sibirica Staudinger, 1881 Tarbagatai Mountains see E. callias
- Erebia sibo (Alphéraky, 1881)
- Erebia sokolovi Lukhtanov, 1990 Alatau, Tian-Shan
- Erebia sthennyo Graslin, 1850 – false dewy ringlet
- Erebia stirius (Godart, [1824]) – Styrian ringlet
- Erebia stubbendorfii Ménétriés, 1846 Siberia, Altai
- Erebia styx (Freyer, 1834) – Stygian ringlet
- Erebia sudetica Staudinger, 1861 – Sudeten ringlet
- Erebia theano (Tauscher, 1806) – Theano alpine
- Erebia tianschanica Heyne, [1894] Alatau
- Erebia transcaucasica Warren, 1950 (previously in E. graucasica) Caucasus
- Erebia triarius (de Prunner, 1798) – de Prunner's ringlet
- Erebia troubridgei (Dubatolov, 1992) Yakutia
- Erebia turanica Erschoff, [1877] Altai, Tian-Shan
- Erebia tyndarus (Esper, 1781) – Swiss brassy ringlet
- Erebia usgentensis Heyne, [1894] Uzgensky Mountains, Kirghizia
- Erebia vidleri Elwes, 1898 – northwest alpine or Vidler's alpine
- Erebia wanga Bremer, 1864
- Erebia youngi Holland, 1900 – Yukon alpine or four-dotted alpine
- Erebia zapateri Oberthür, 1875 – Zapater's ringlet

== Gallery ==
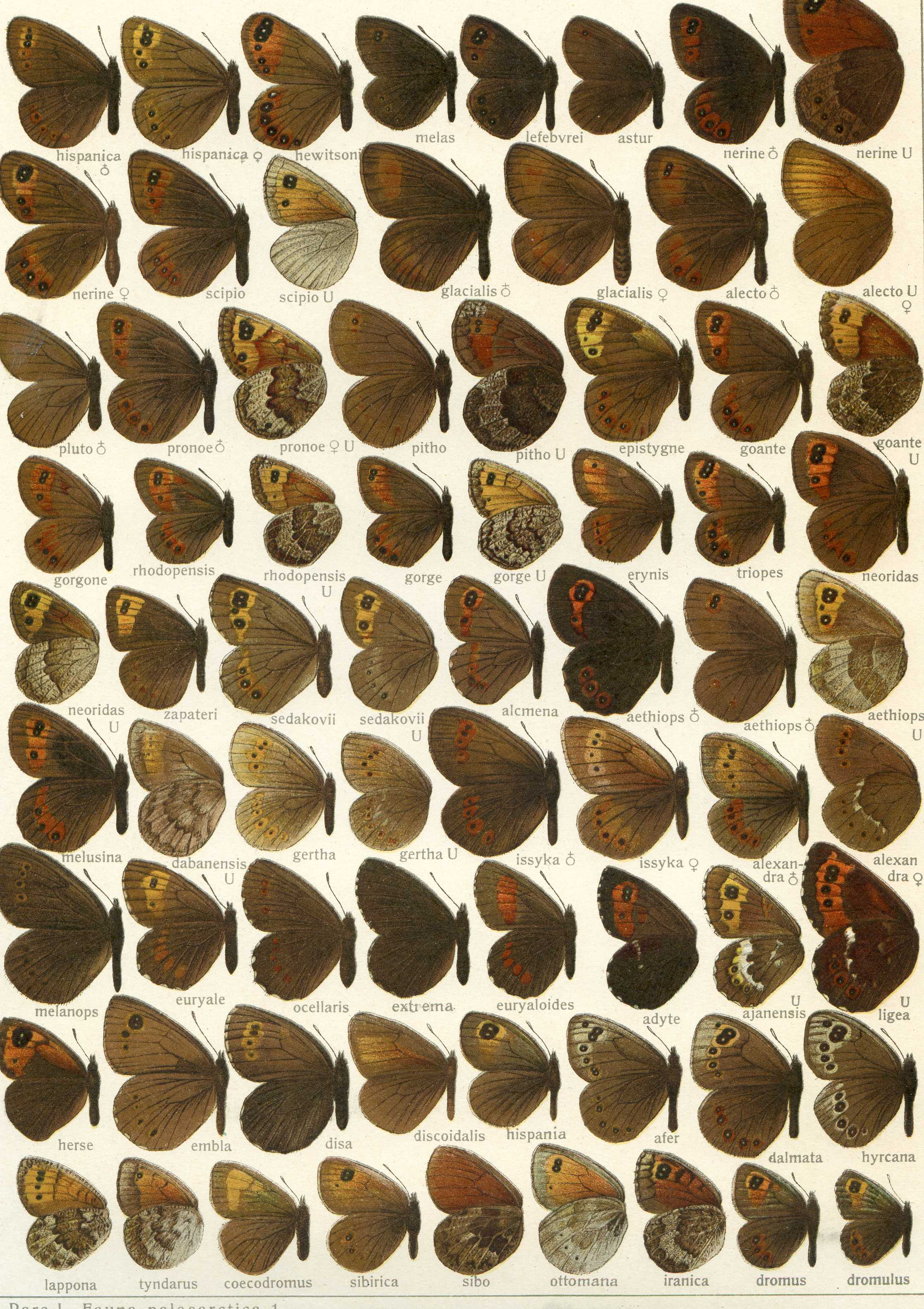
First of the three Erebia plates in the 1915 Macrolepidoptera of the World, edited by Adalbert Seitz. This work was published near the height of taxonomic confusion about these butterflies.

Another Macrolepidoptera of the World plate, showing larger species.

Third Macrolepidoptera of the World plate, of the 31 named taxa depicted, probably less than 10 are actual species.

== Erebia comparison ==
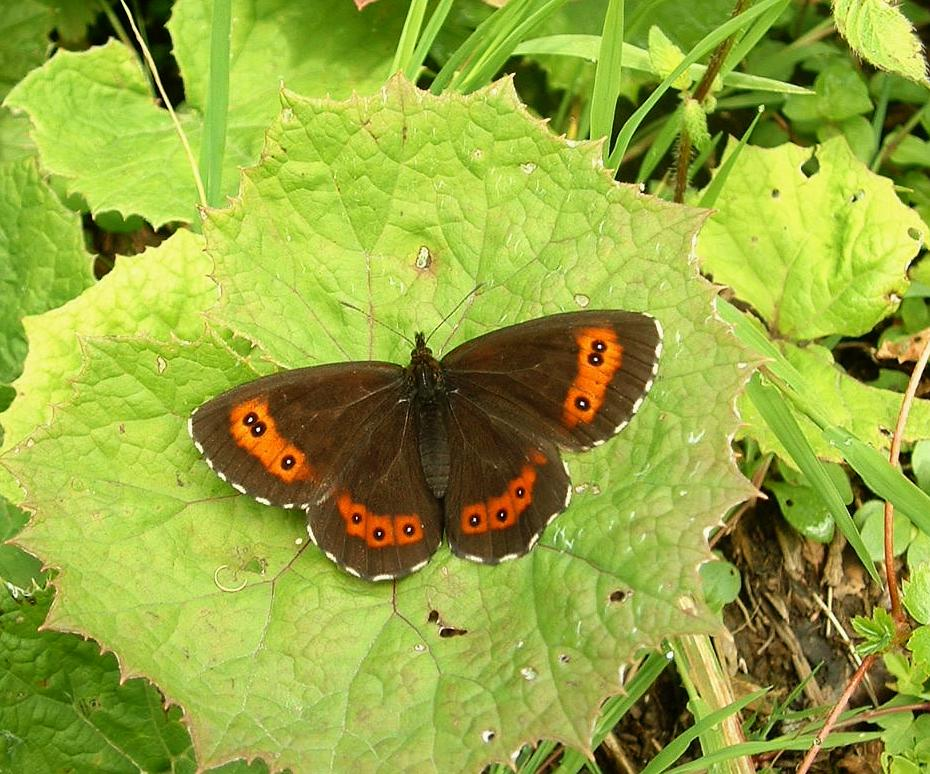
Erebia ligea

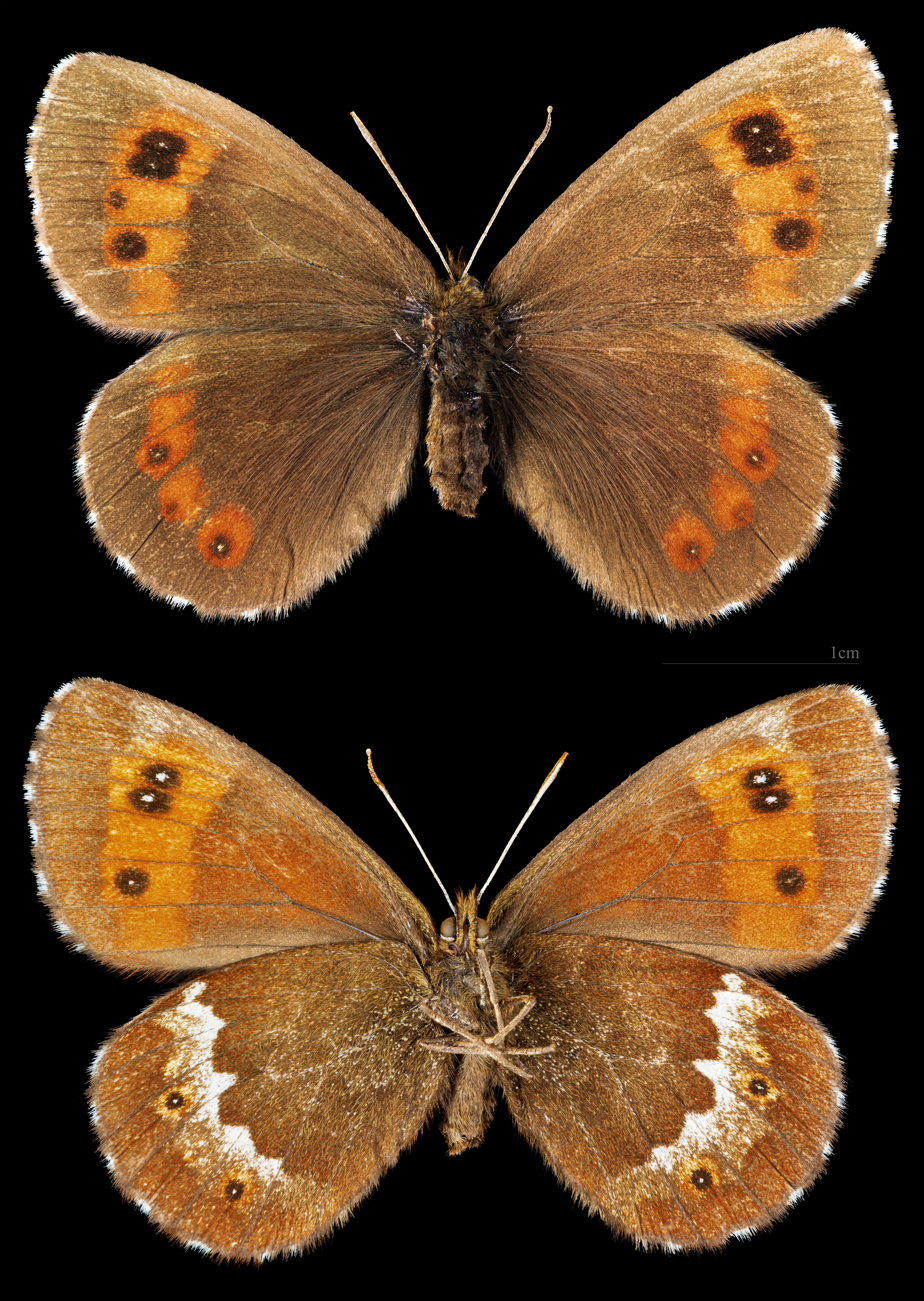
Erebia ligea ♀

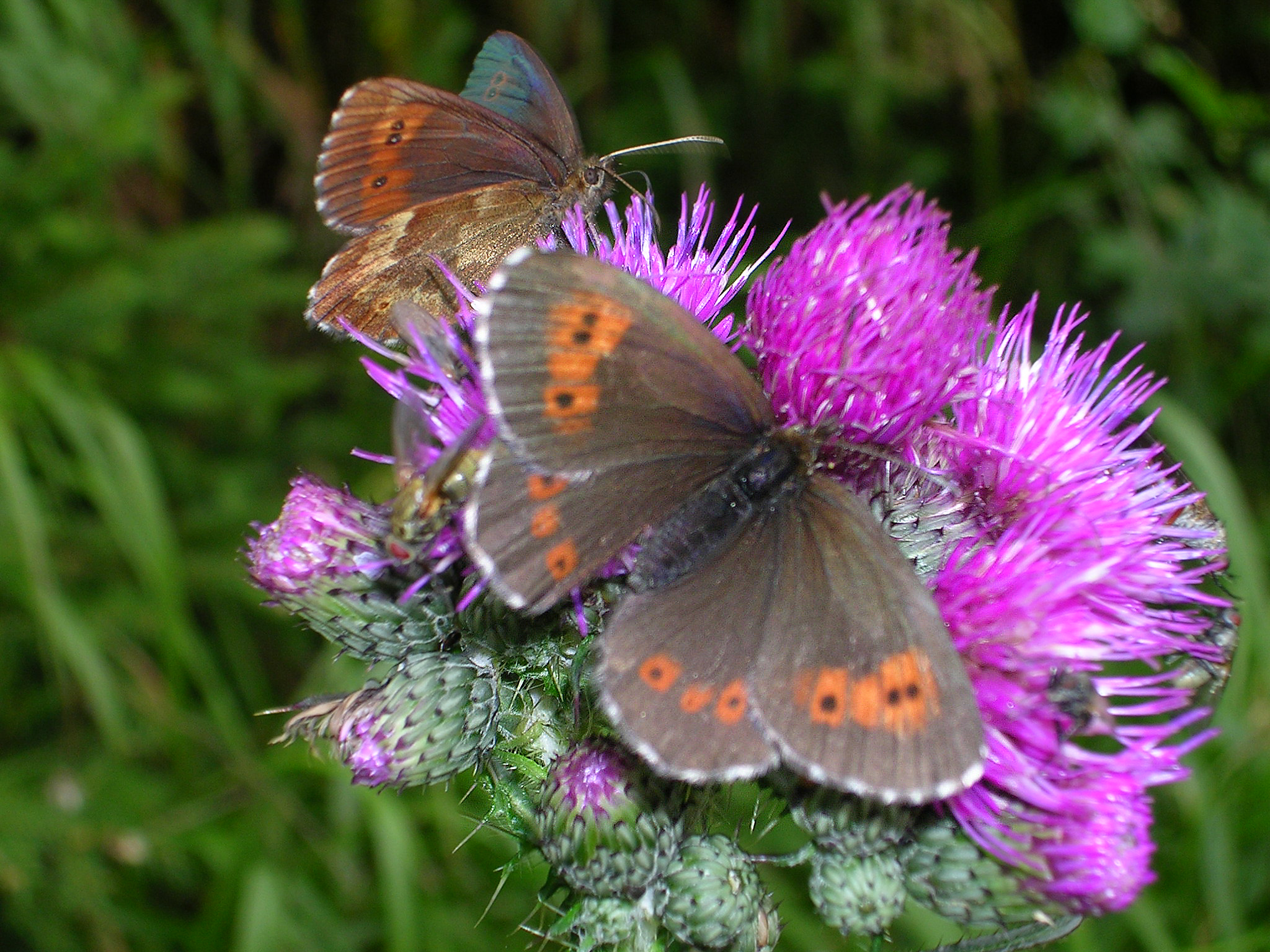
Erebia euryale

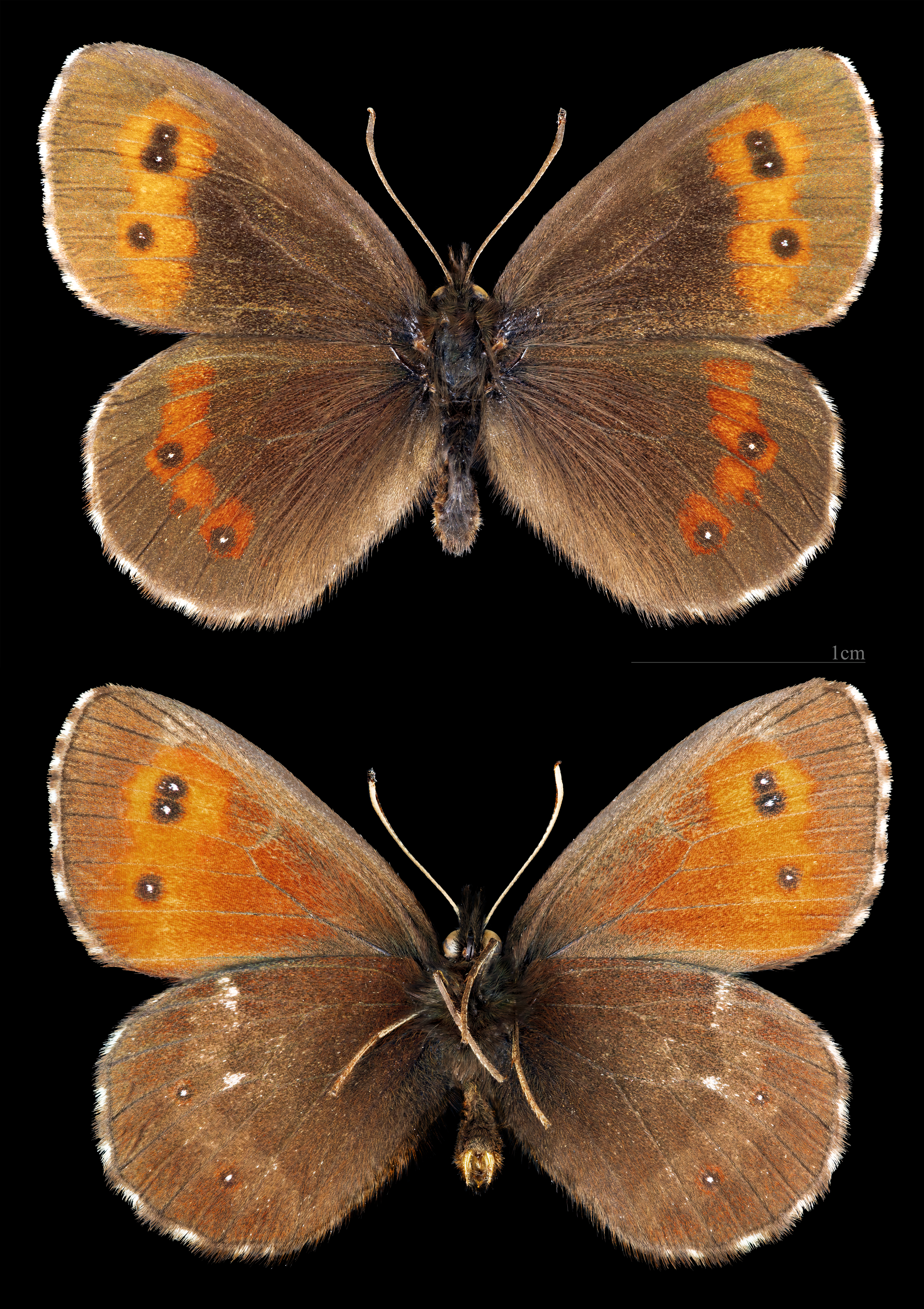
Erebia euryale ♂

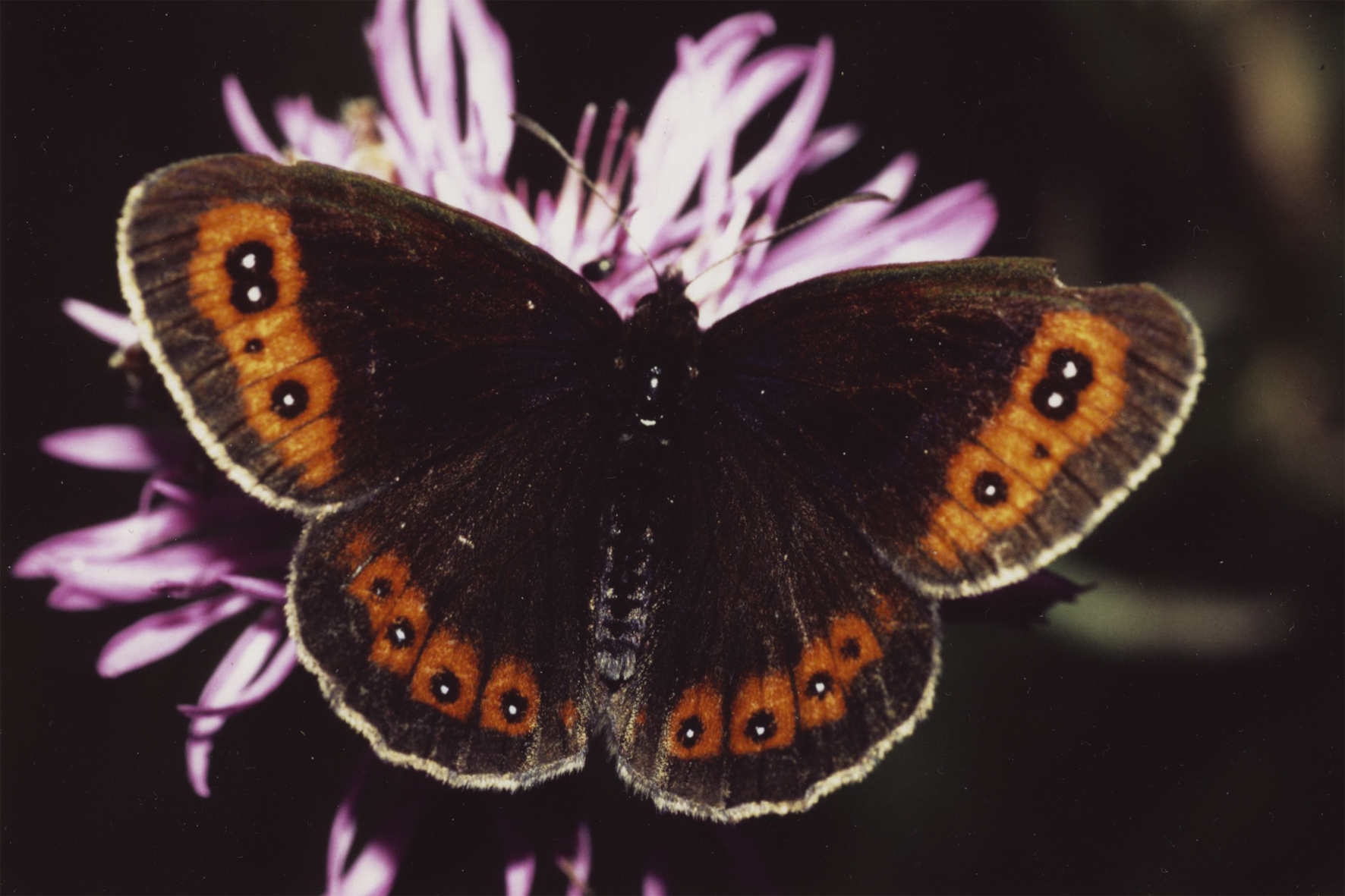
Erebia aethiops

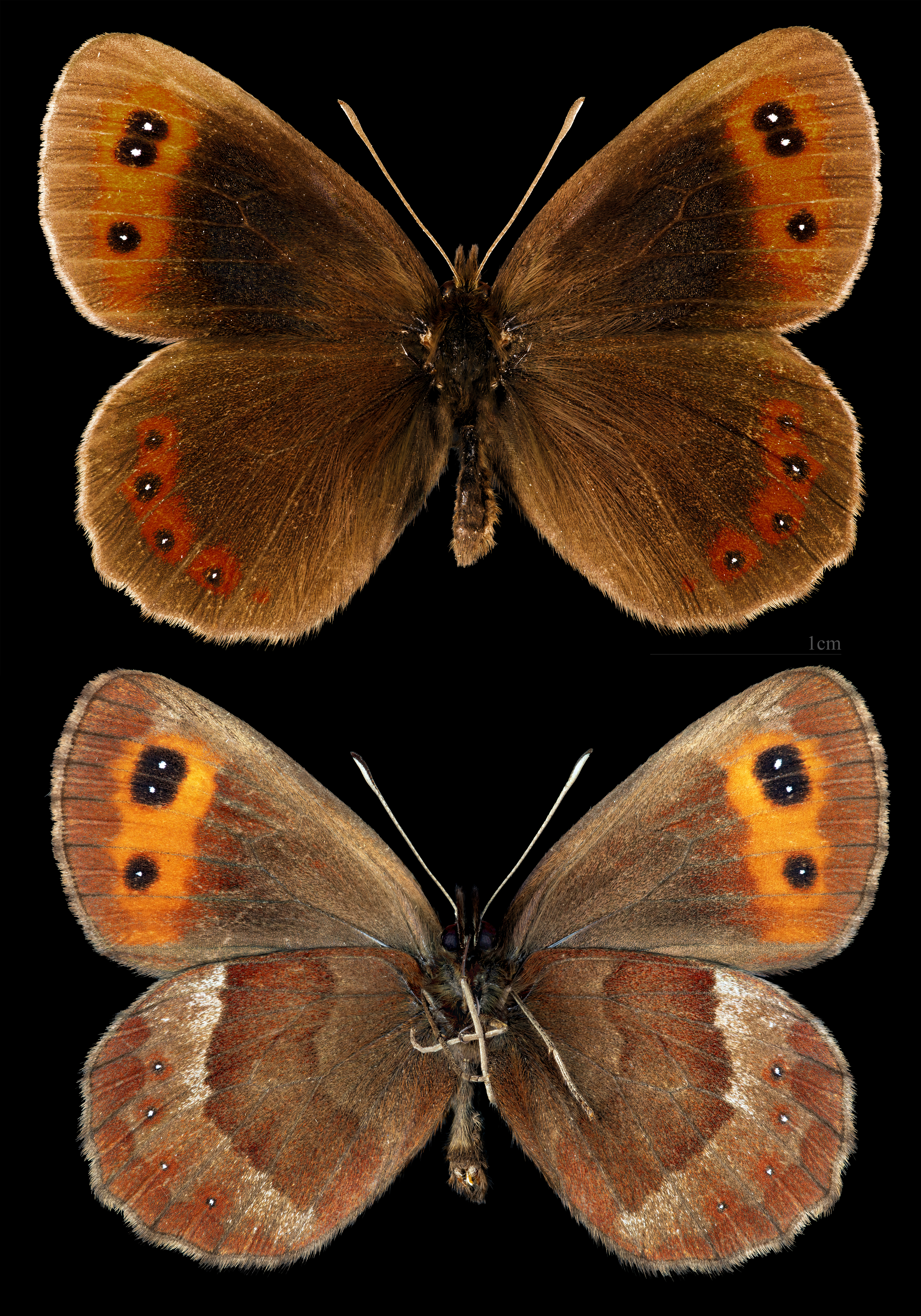
Erebia aethiops♂

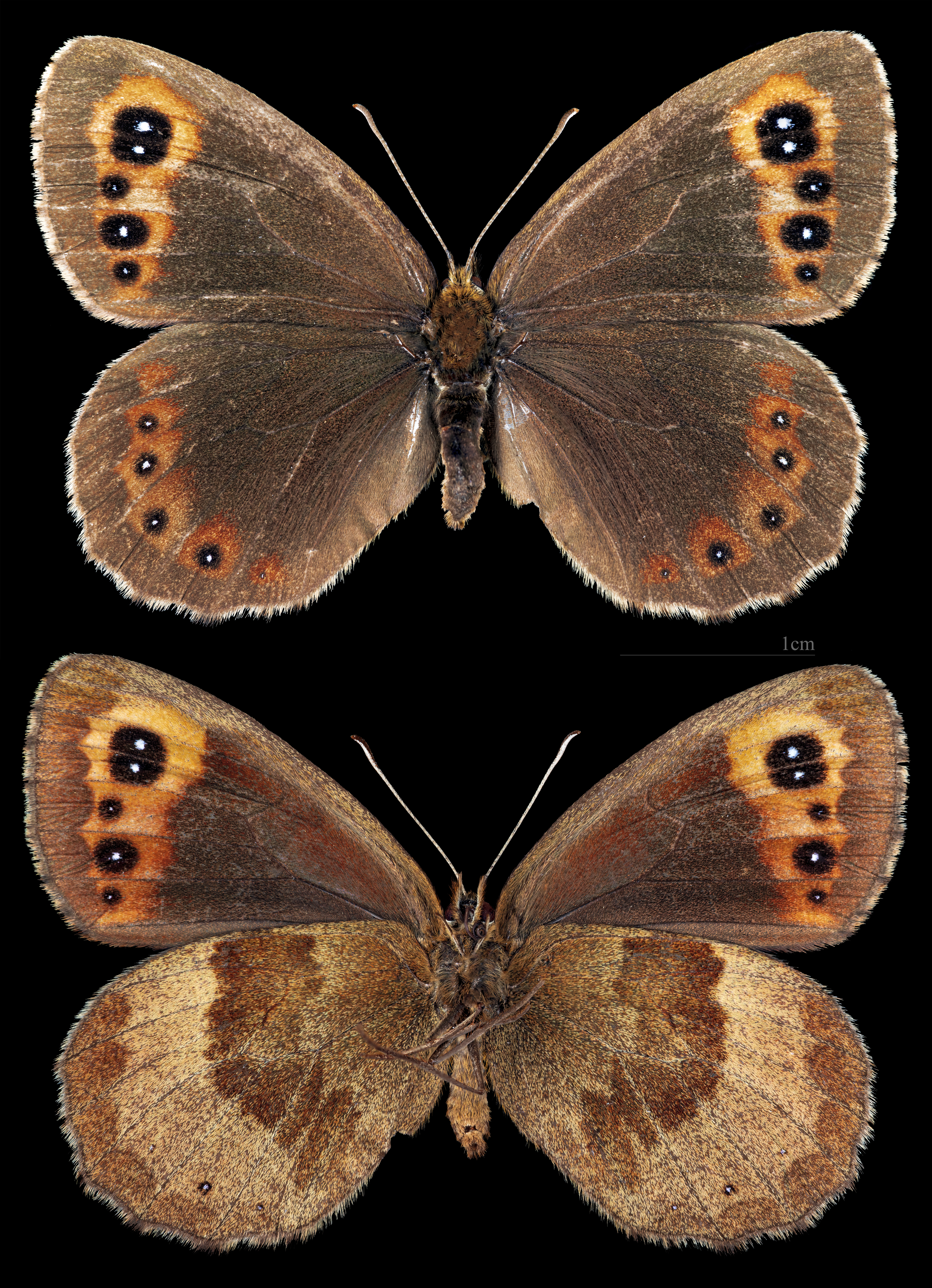
Erebia aethiops ♀

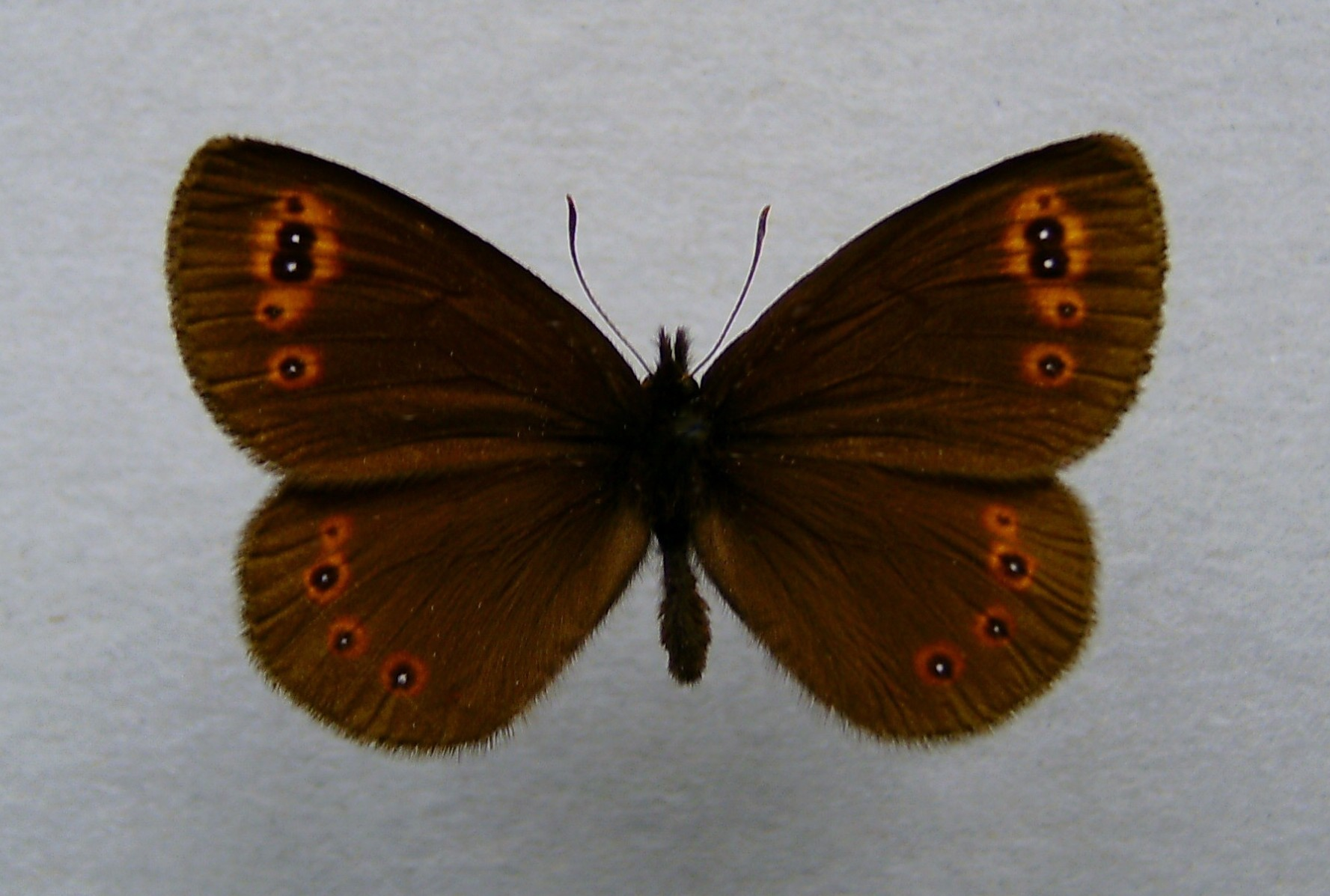
Erebia medusa ♂

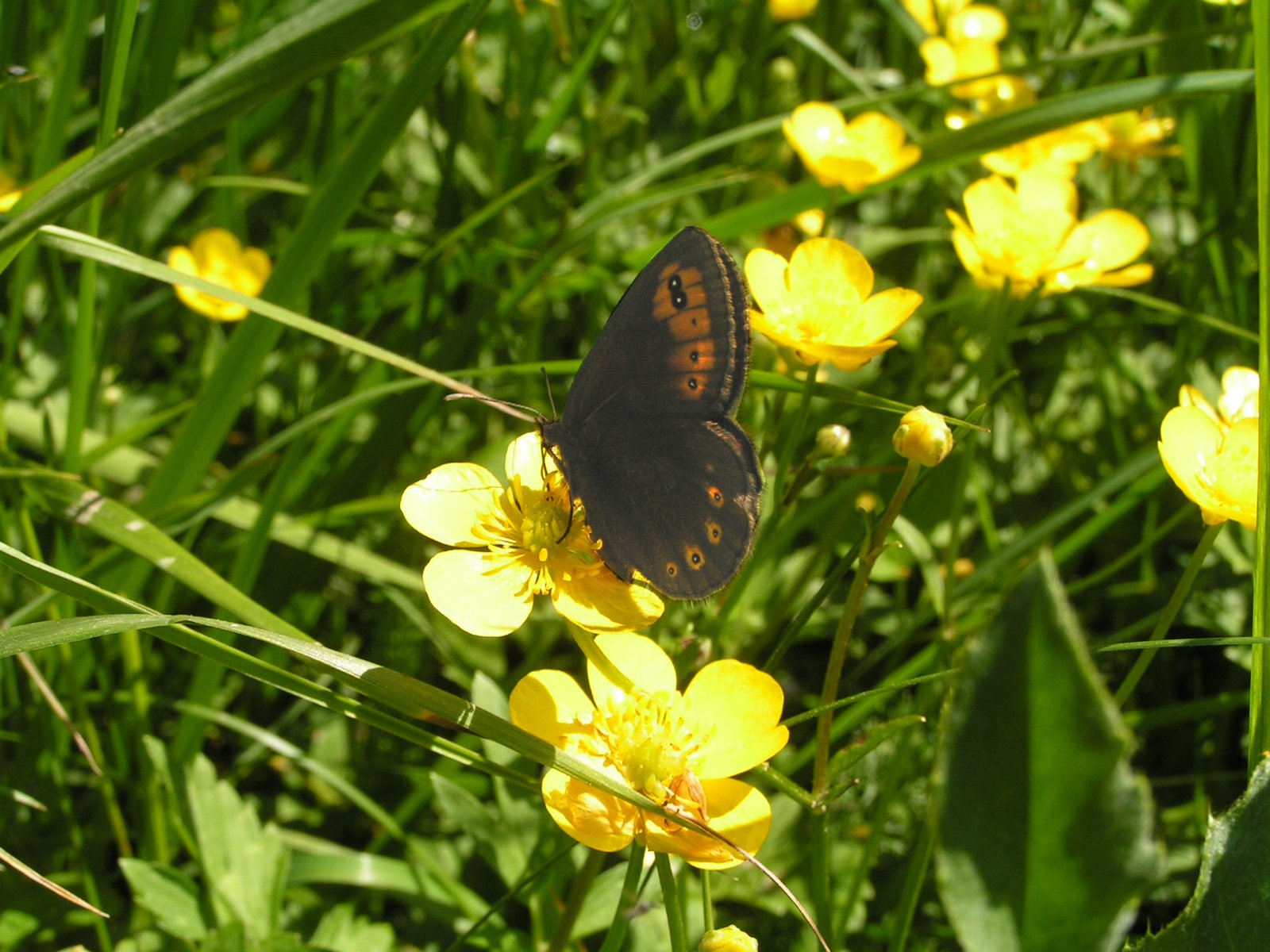
Erebia medusa

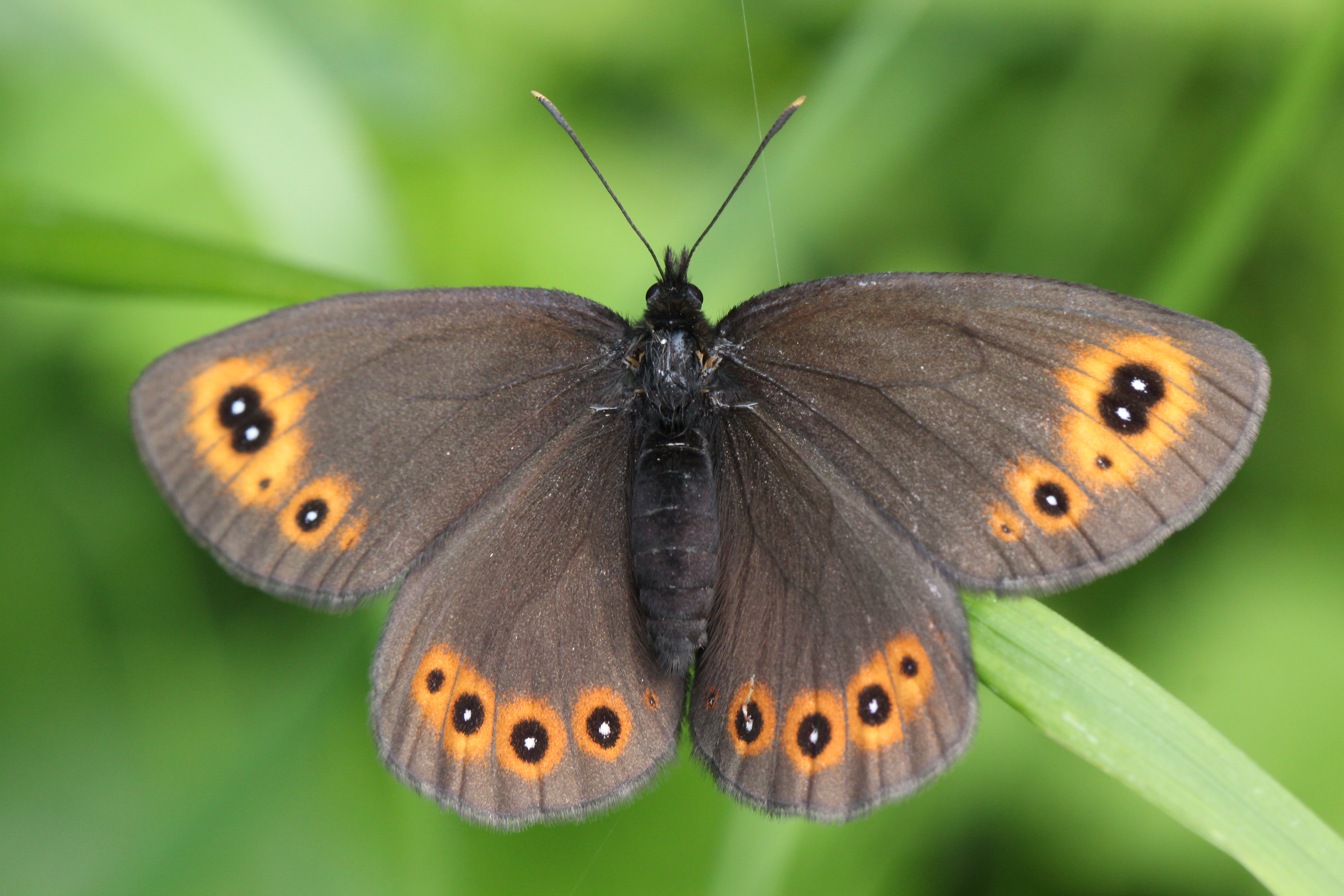
Erebia medusa ♀

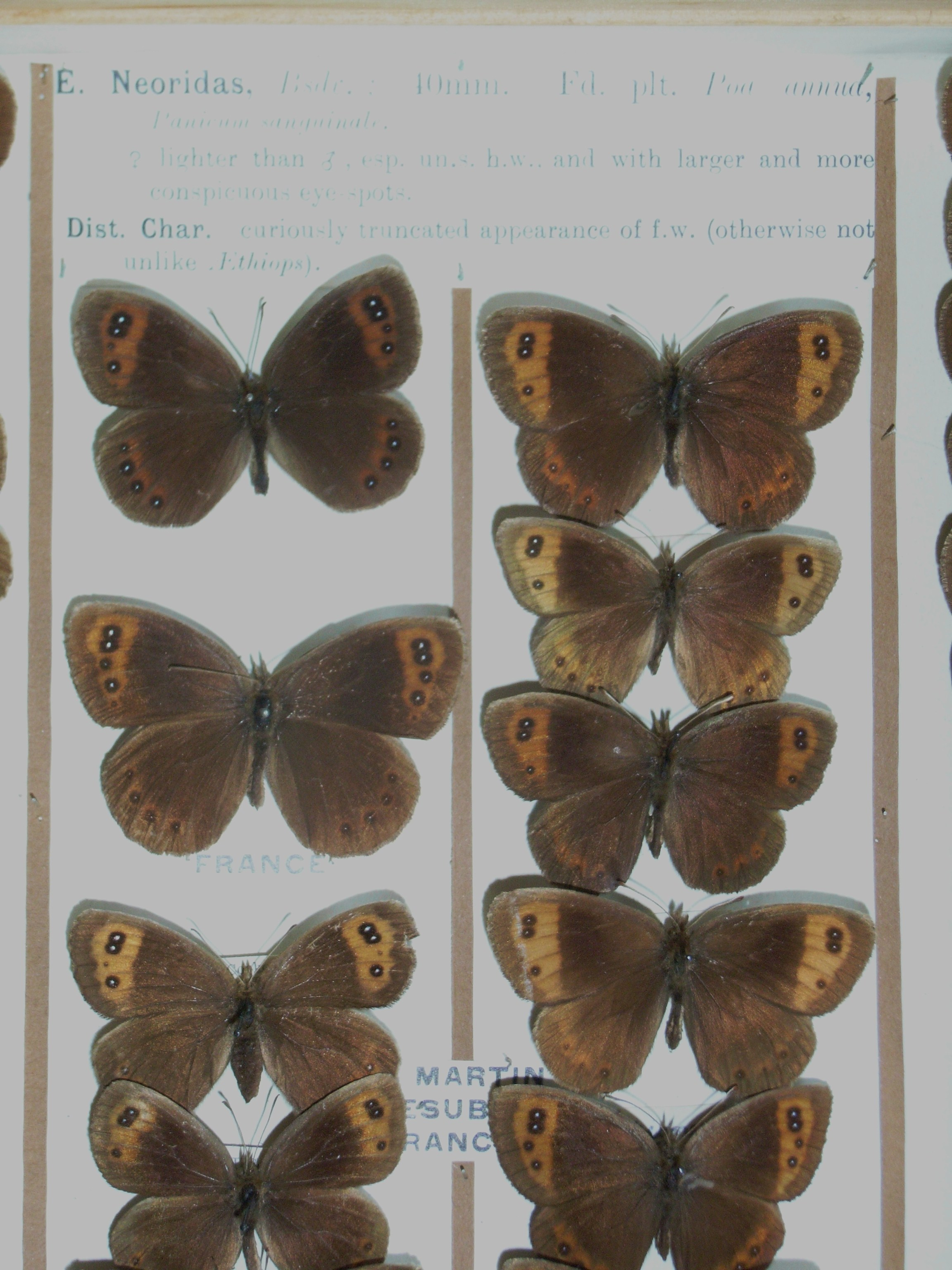
Erebia neoridas

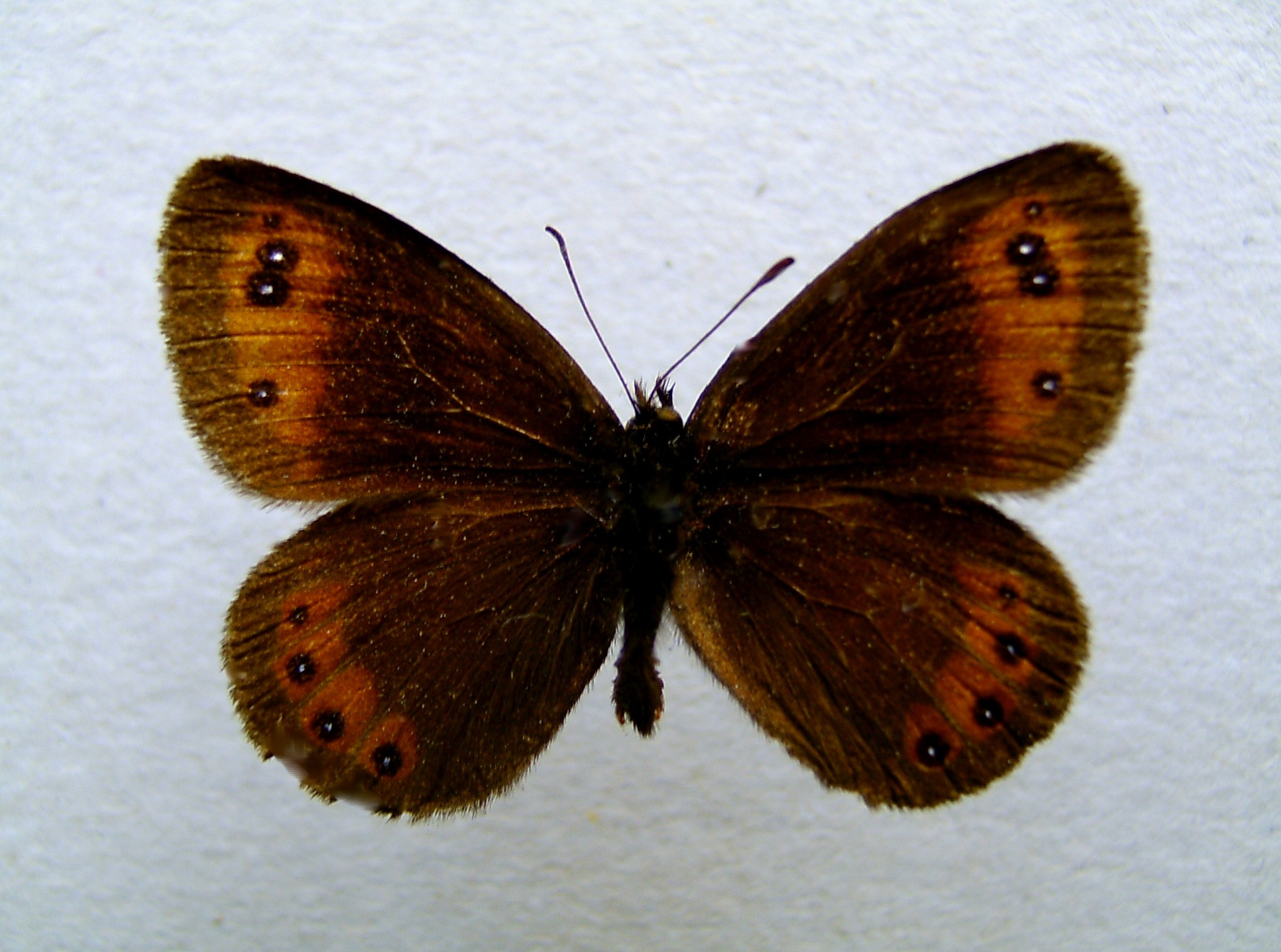
Erebia meolans

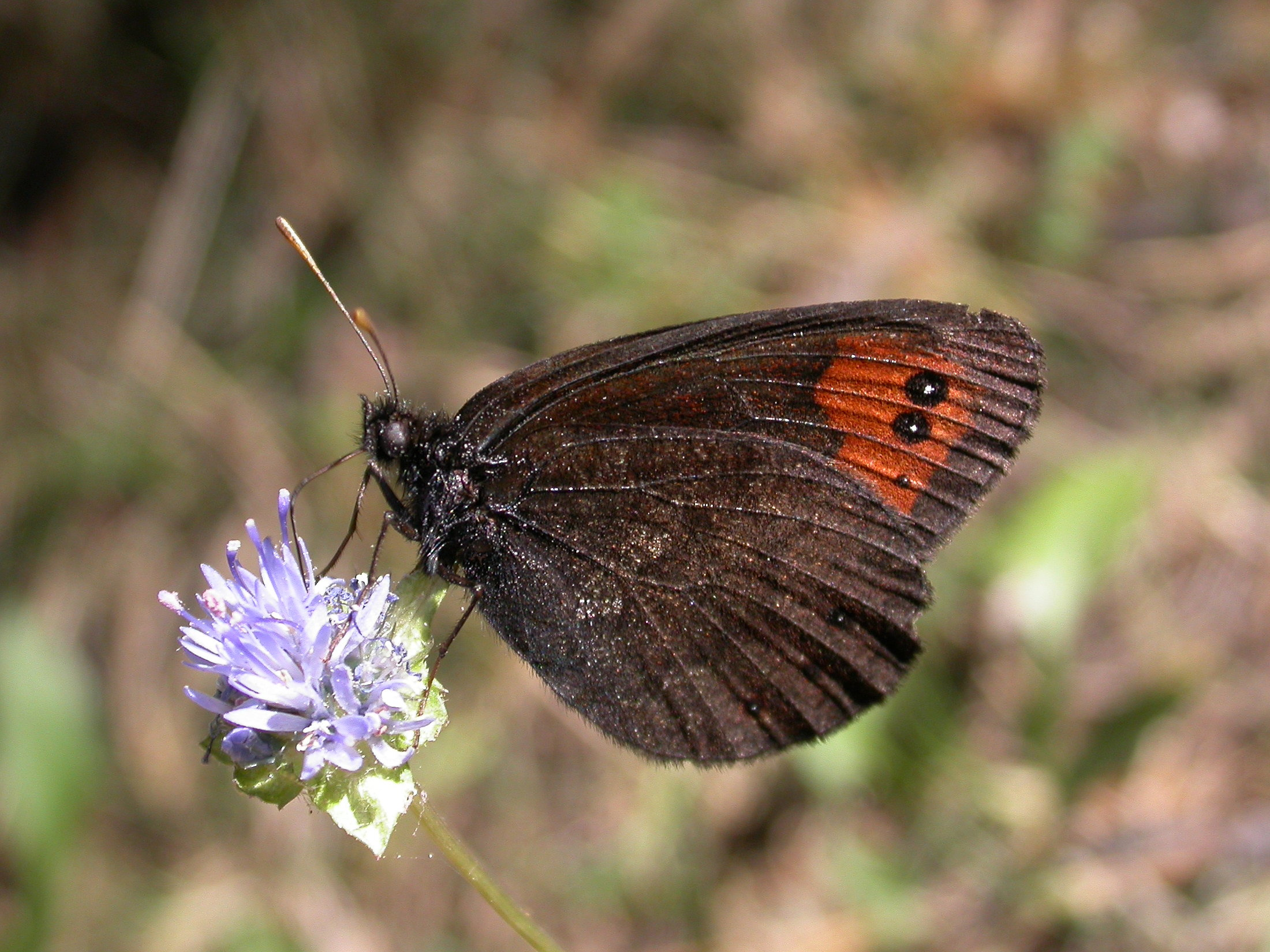
Erebia meolans

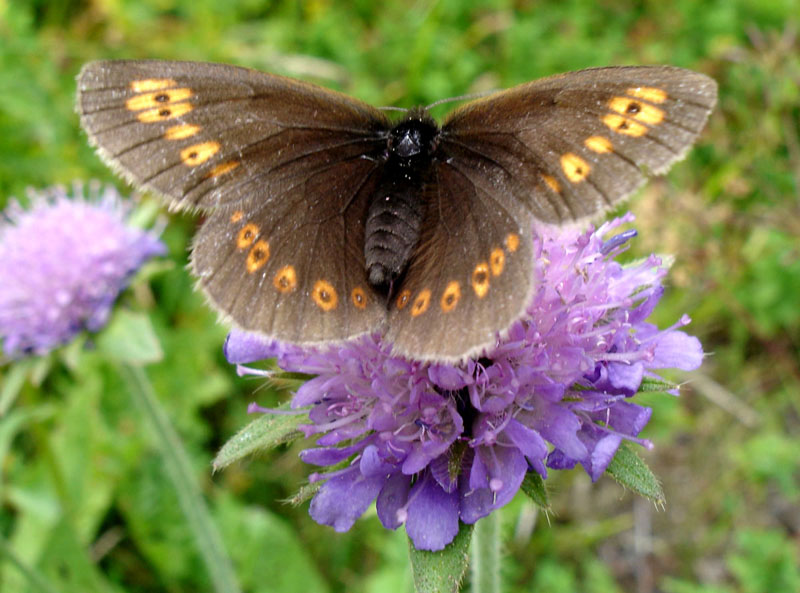
Erebia alberganus

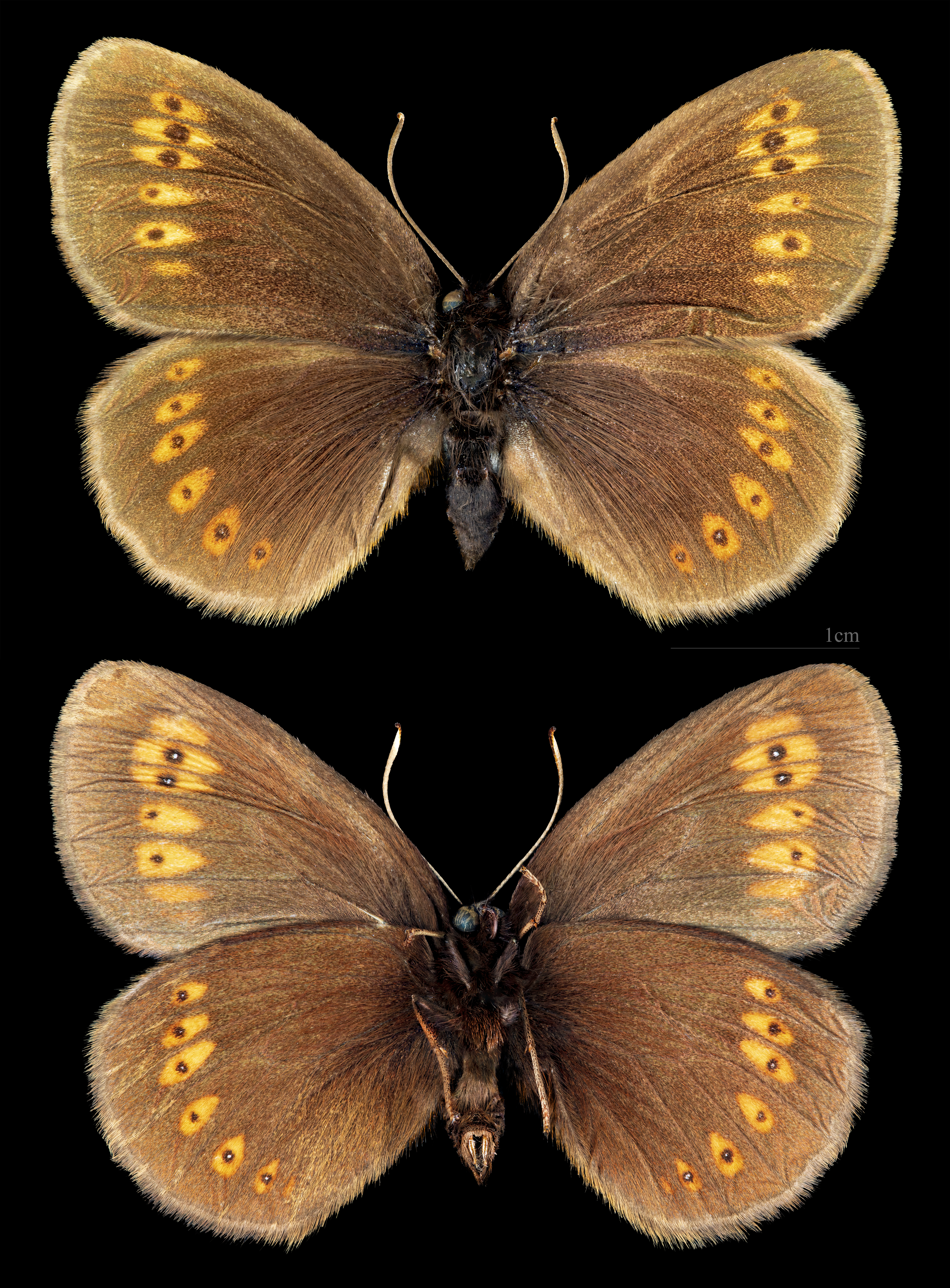
Erebia alberganus

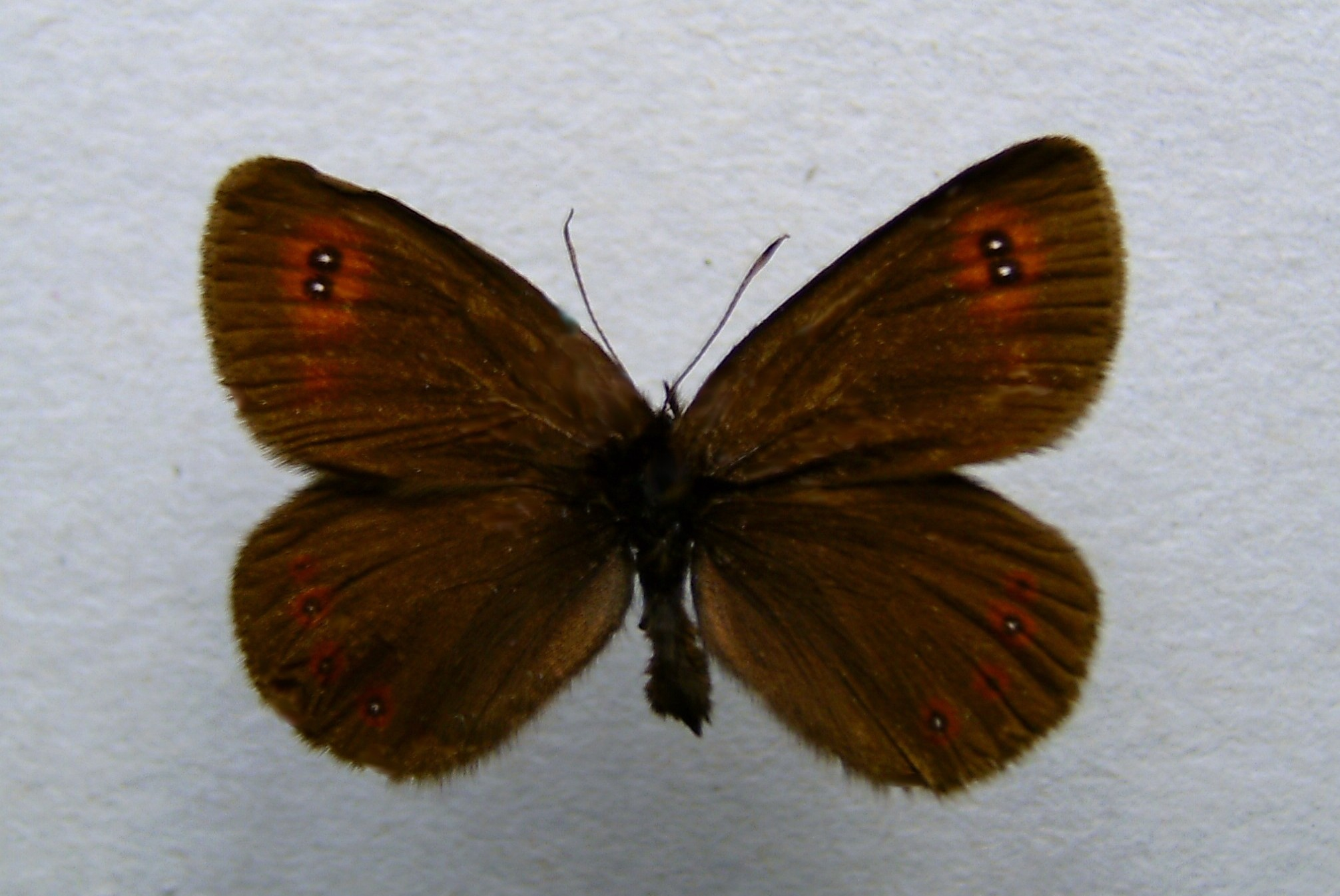
Erebia oeme ♂

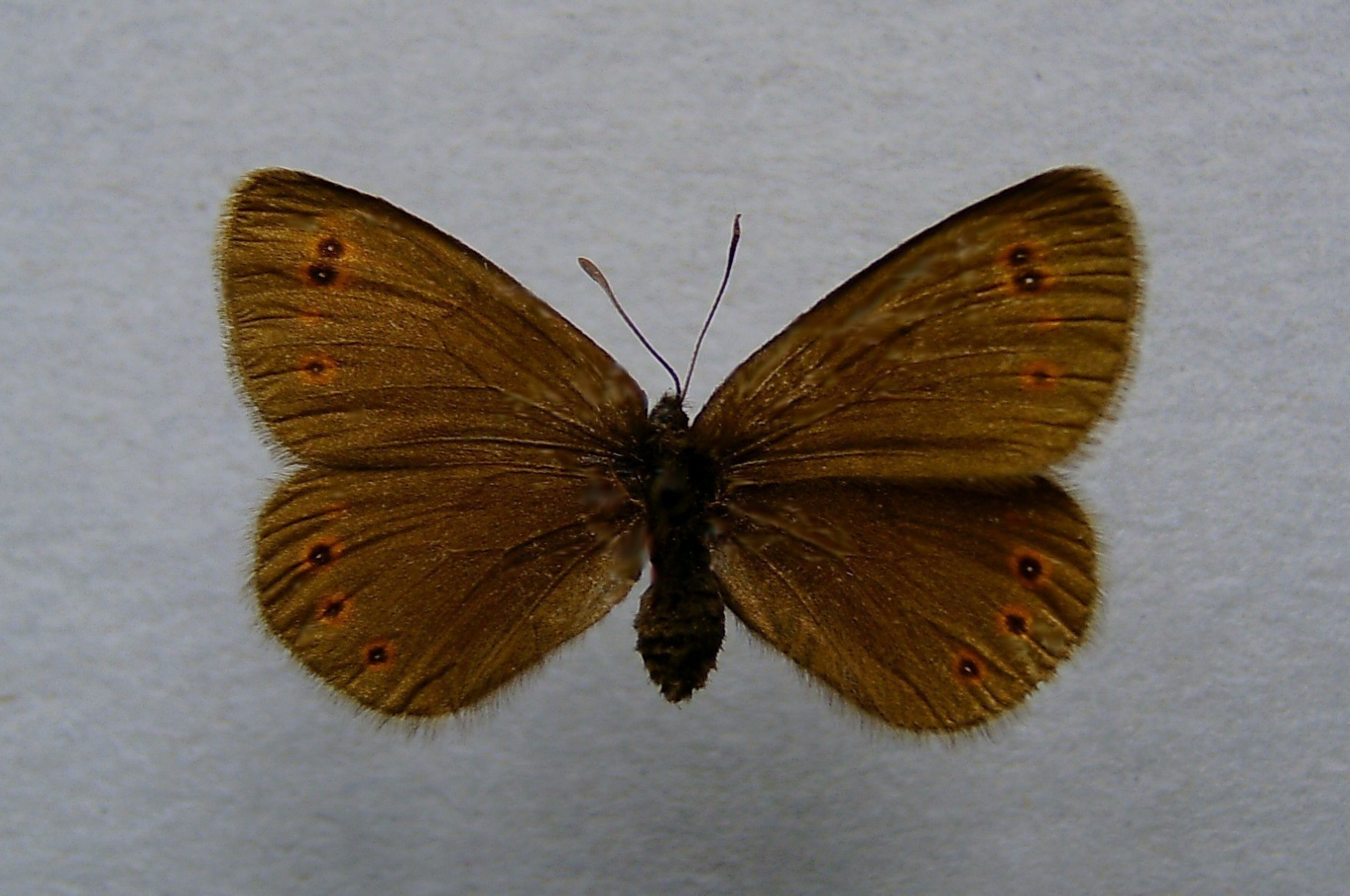
Erebia oeme ♀

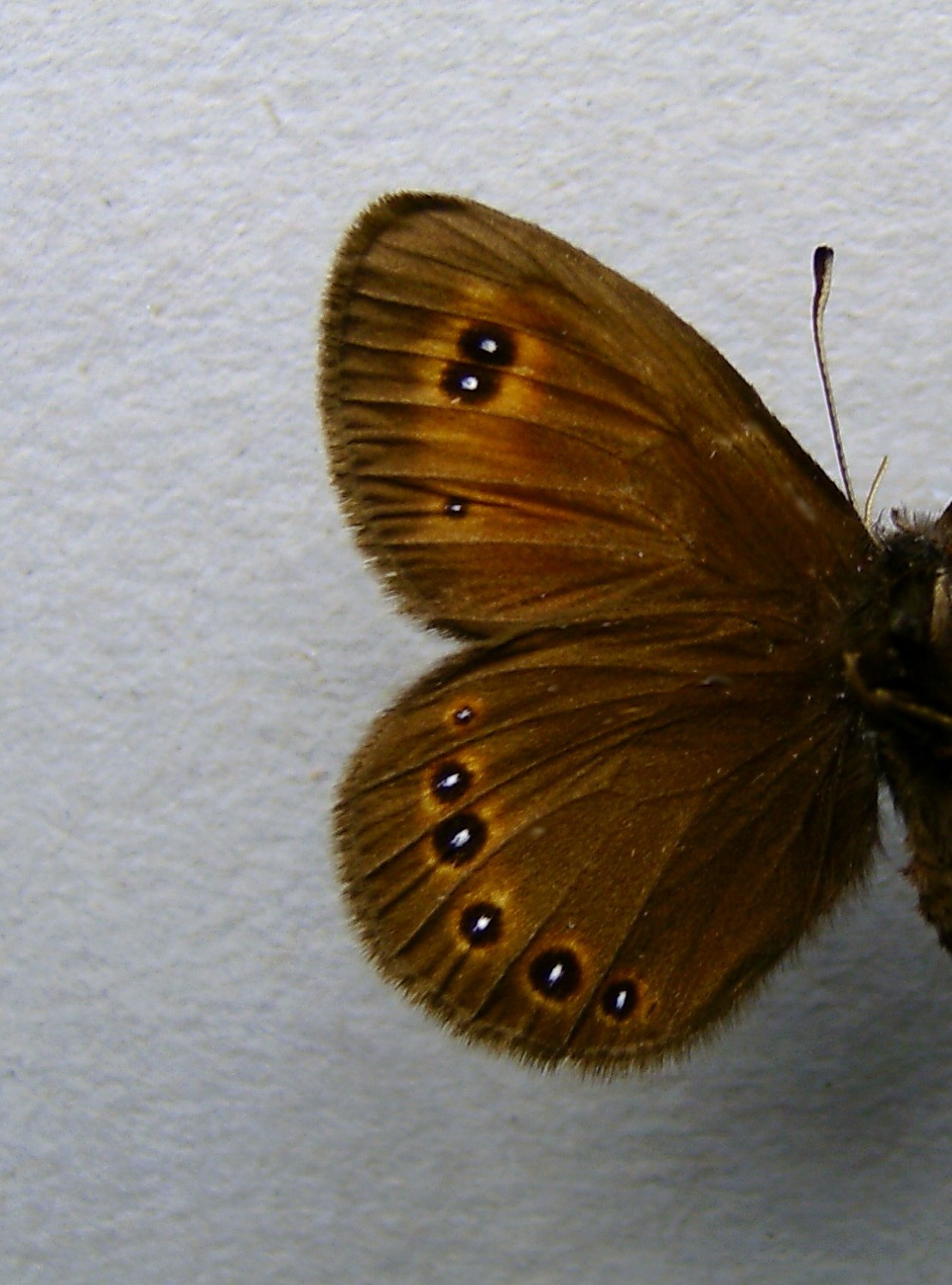
Erebia oeme
underside ♂

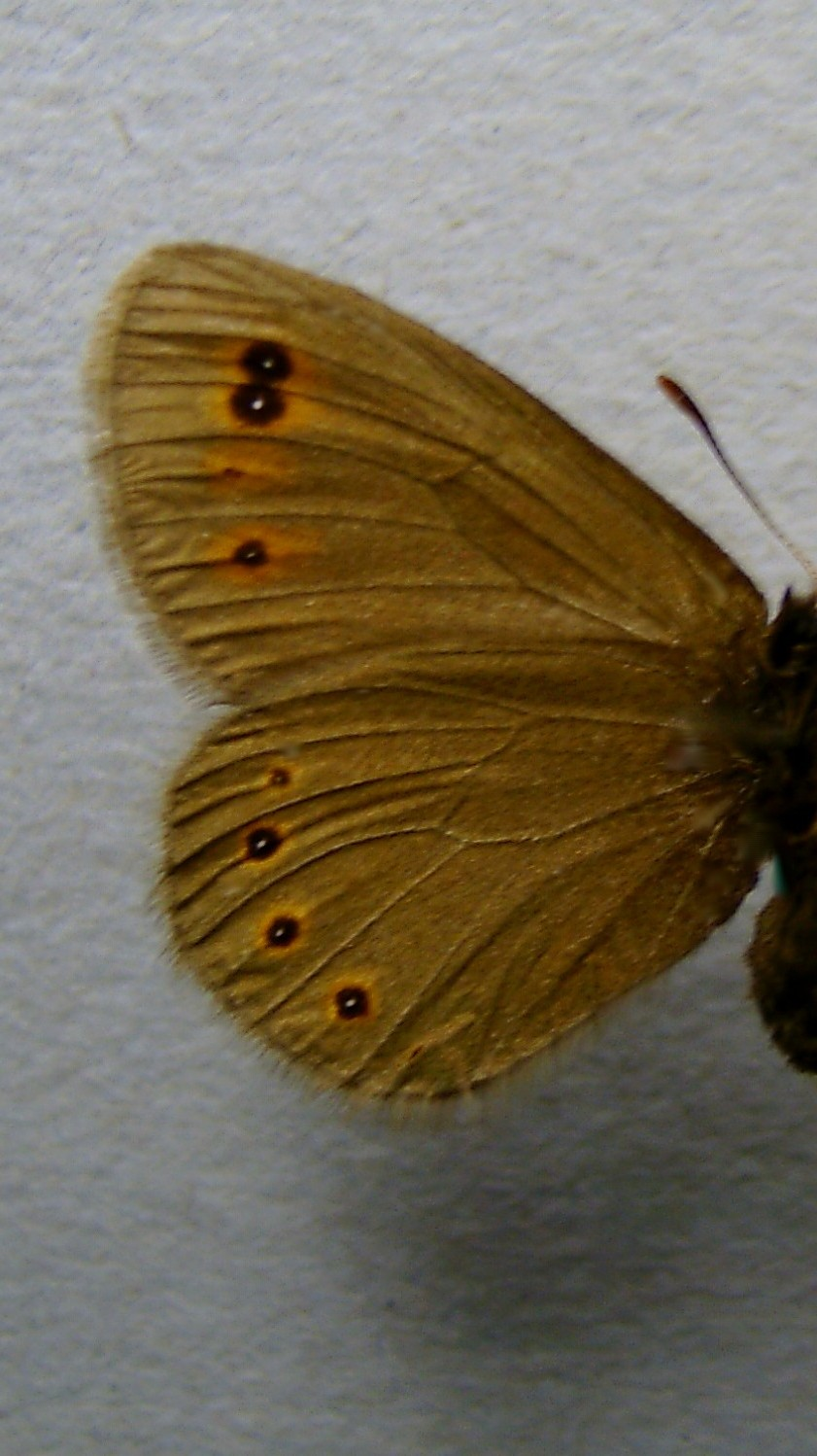
Erebia oeme
underside ♀

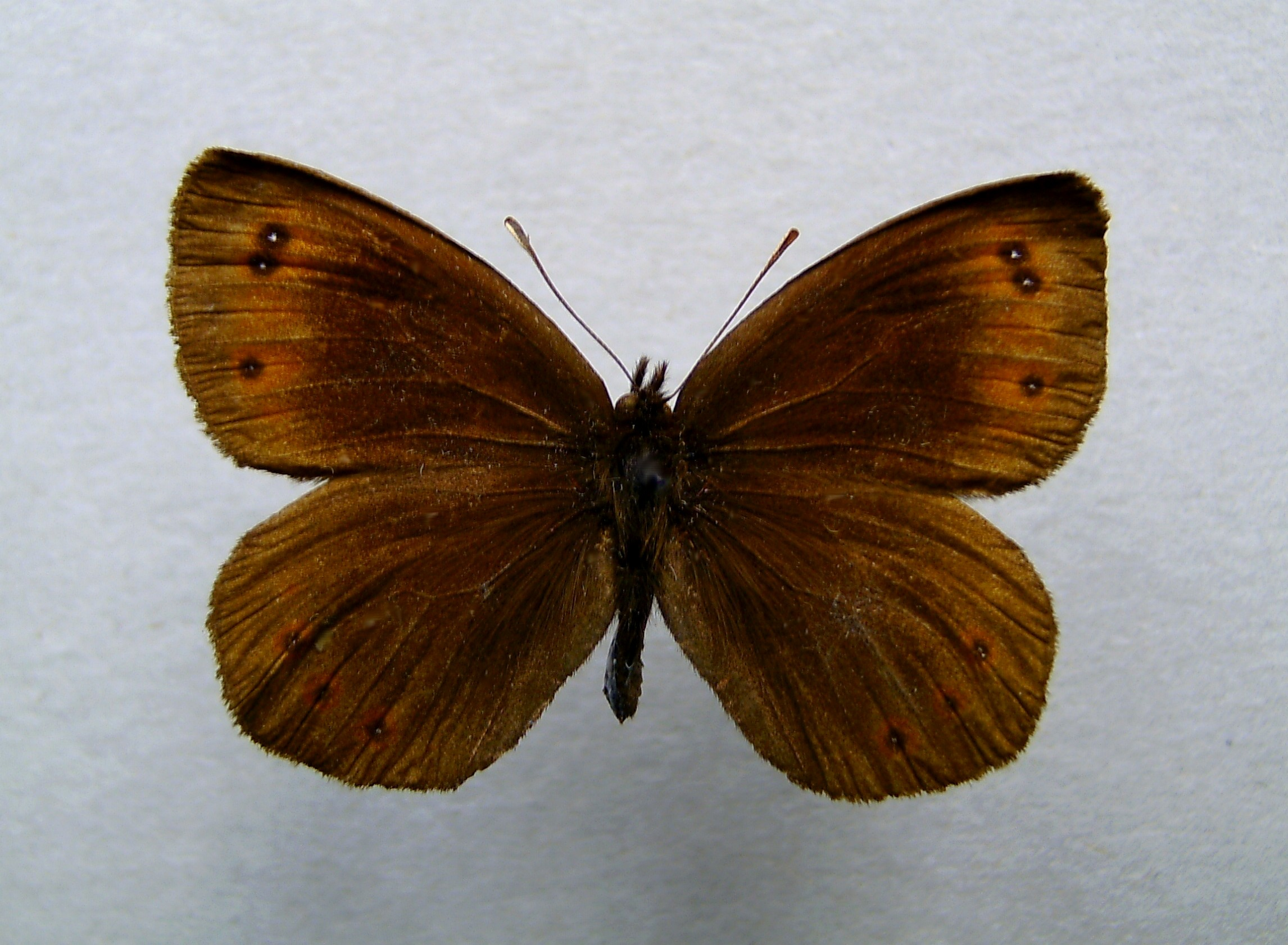
Erebia pronoe

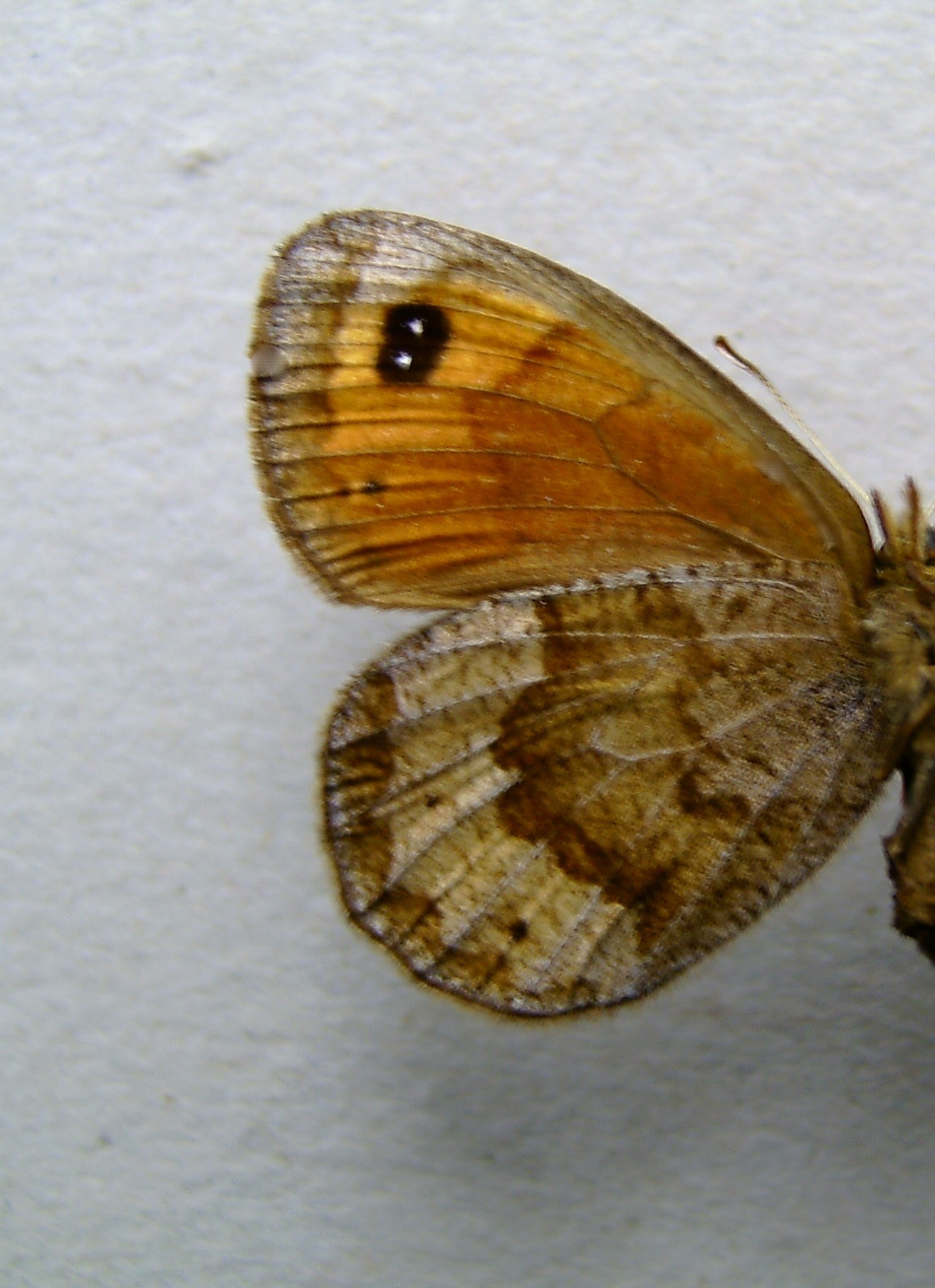
Erebia pronoe
underside ♀

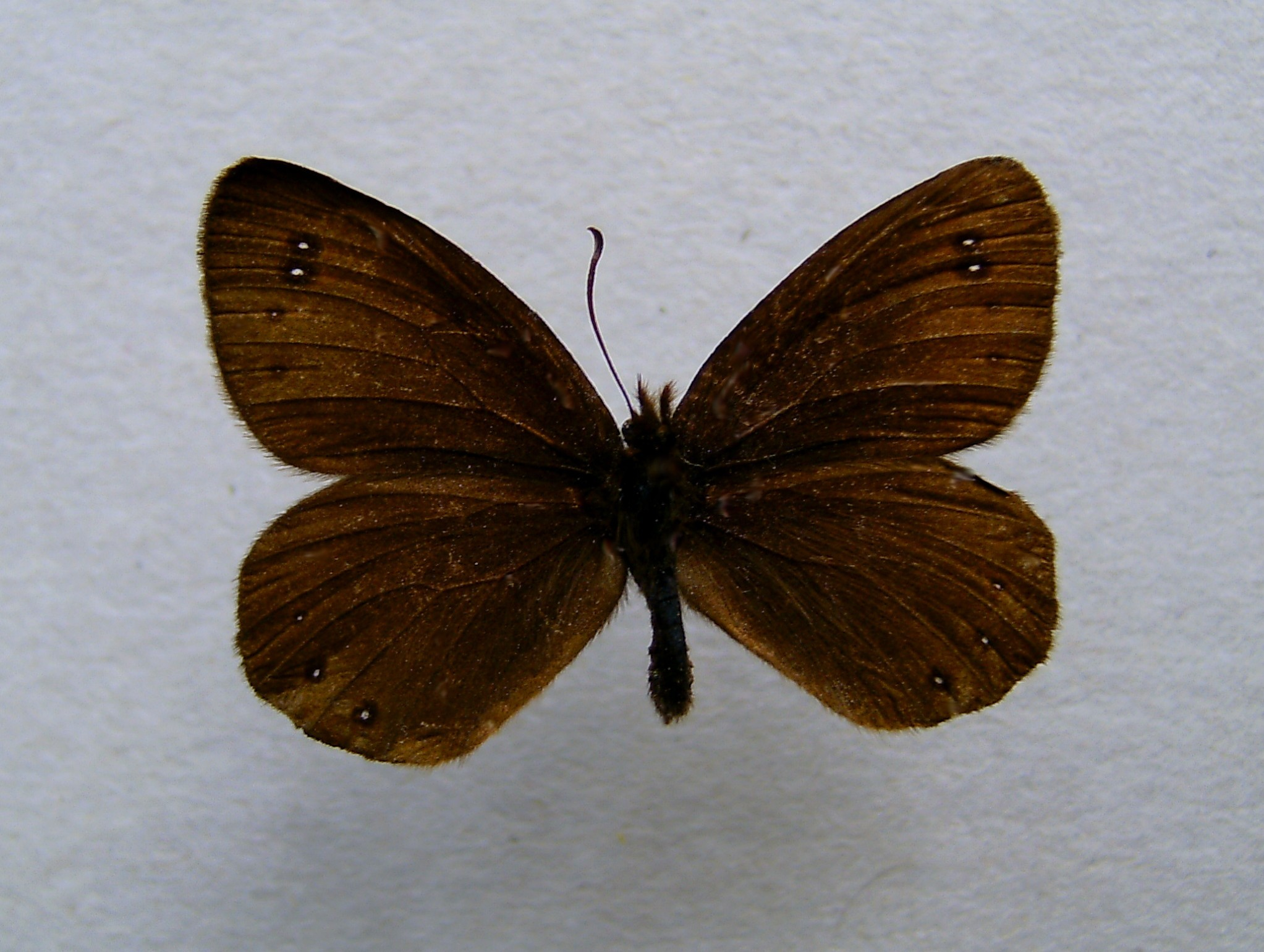
Erebia pluto

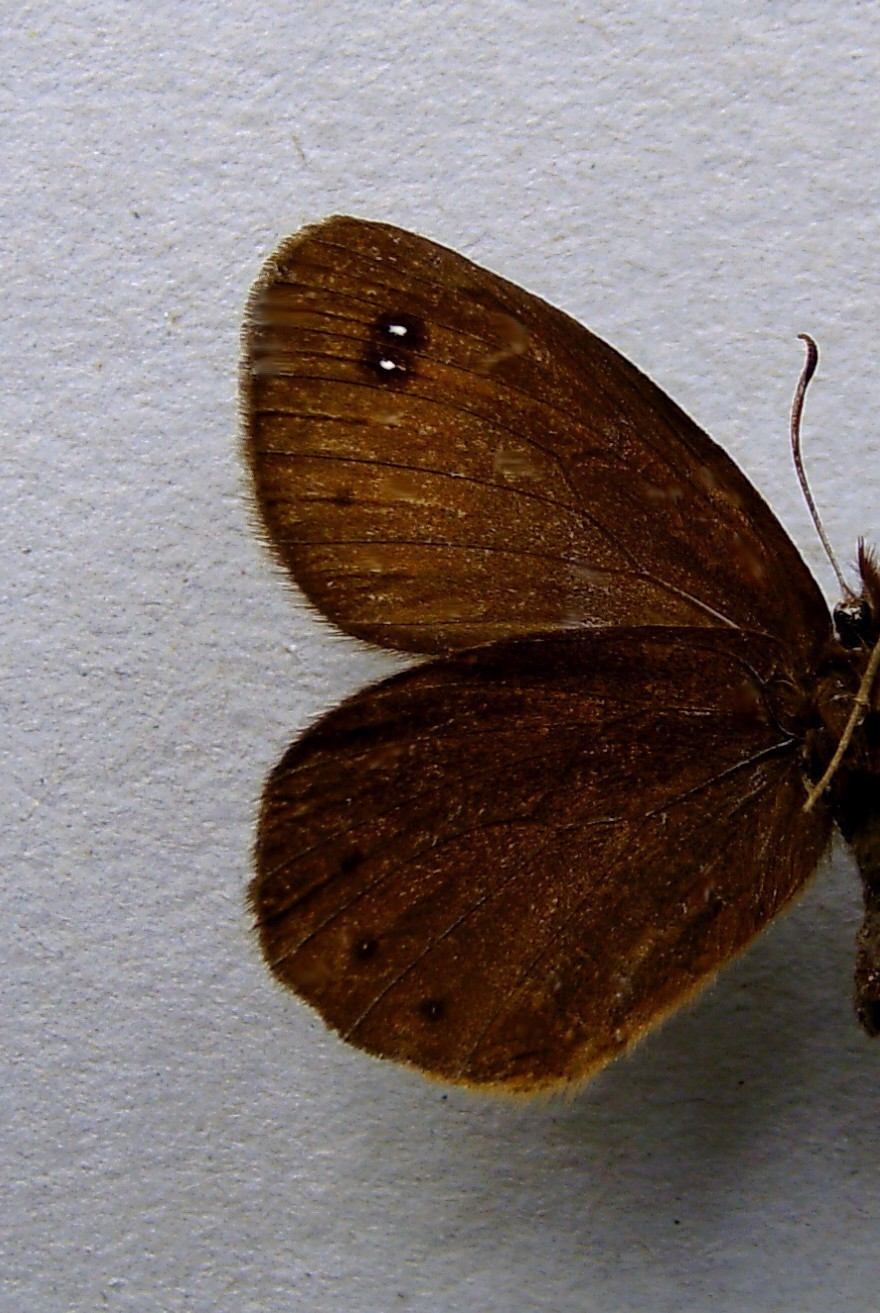
Erebia pluto
underside

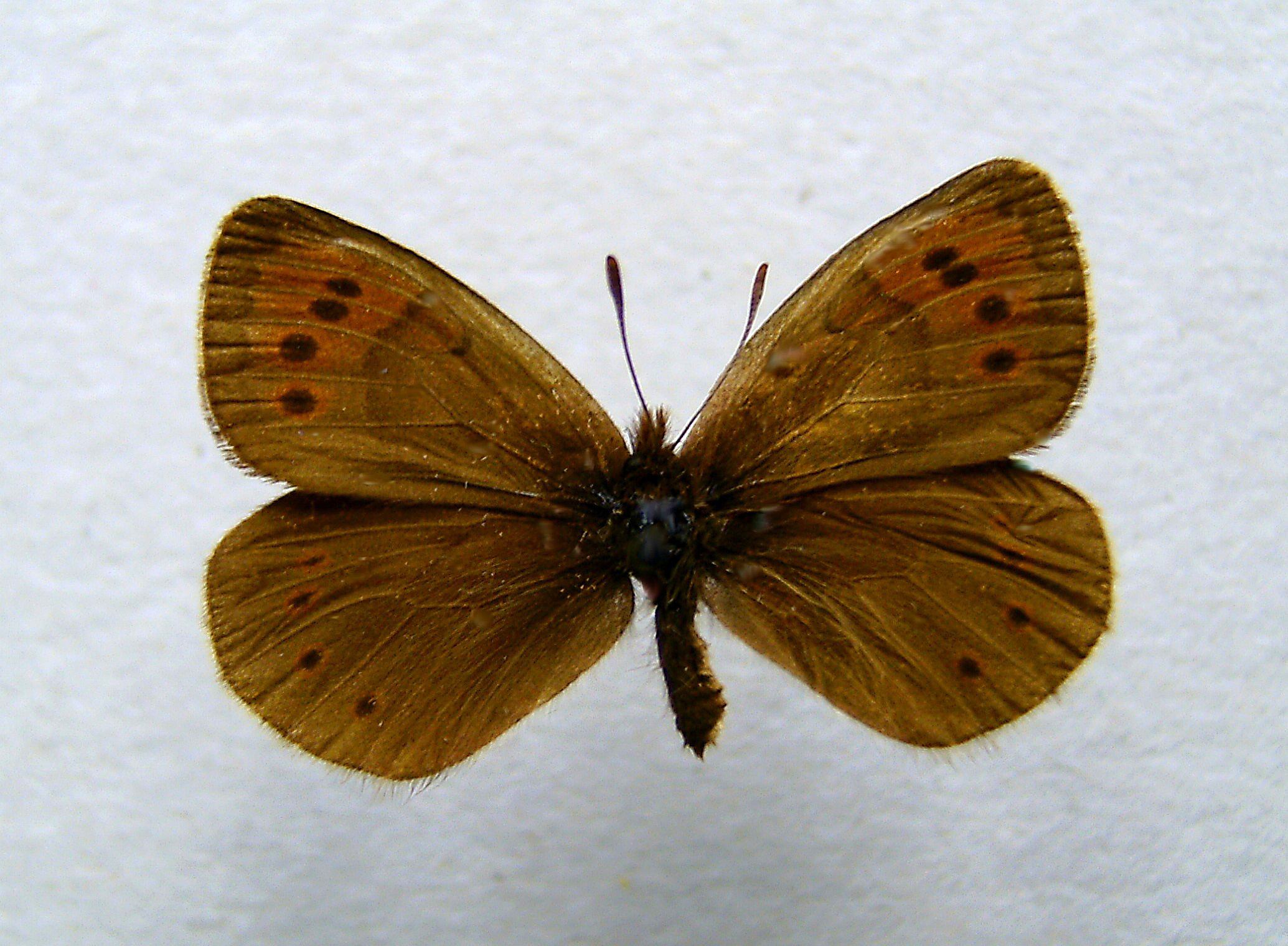
Erebia pandrose

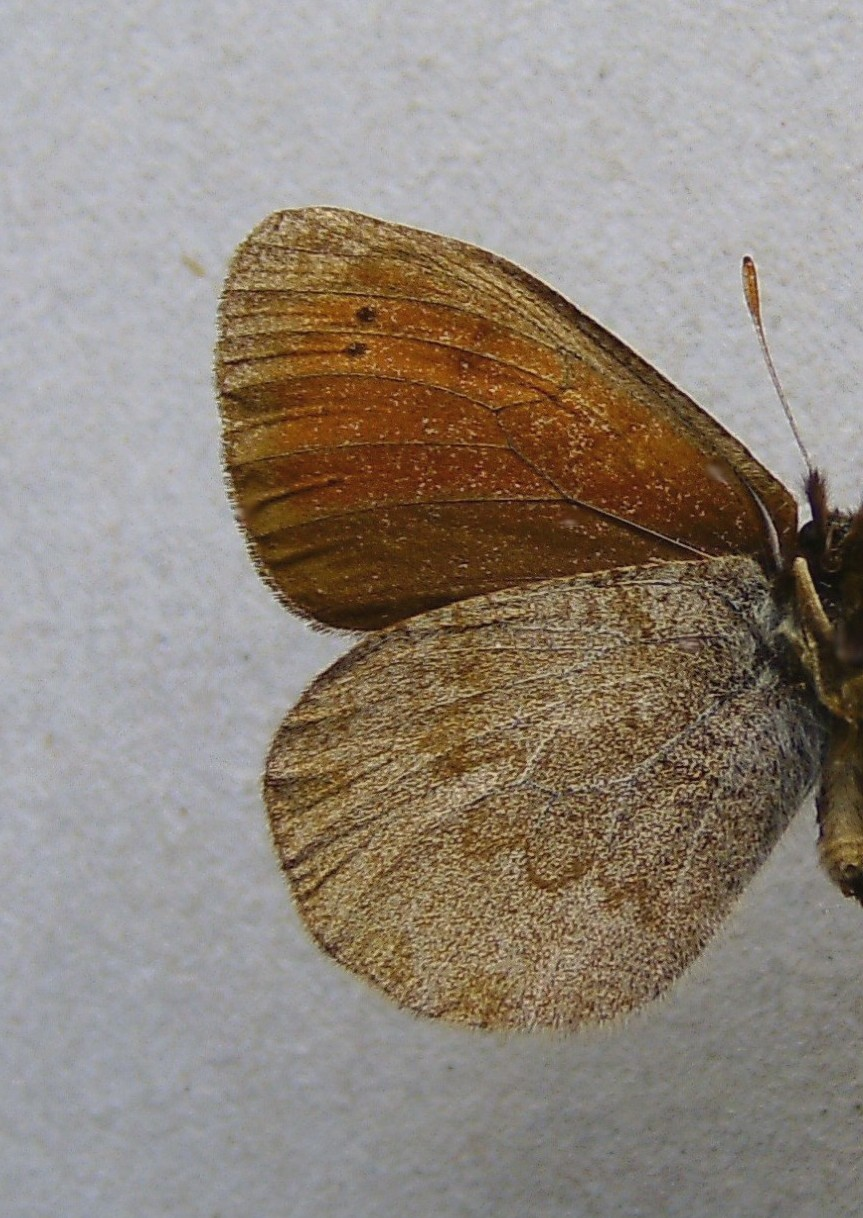
Erebia pandrose
underside

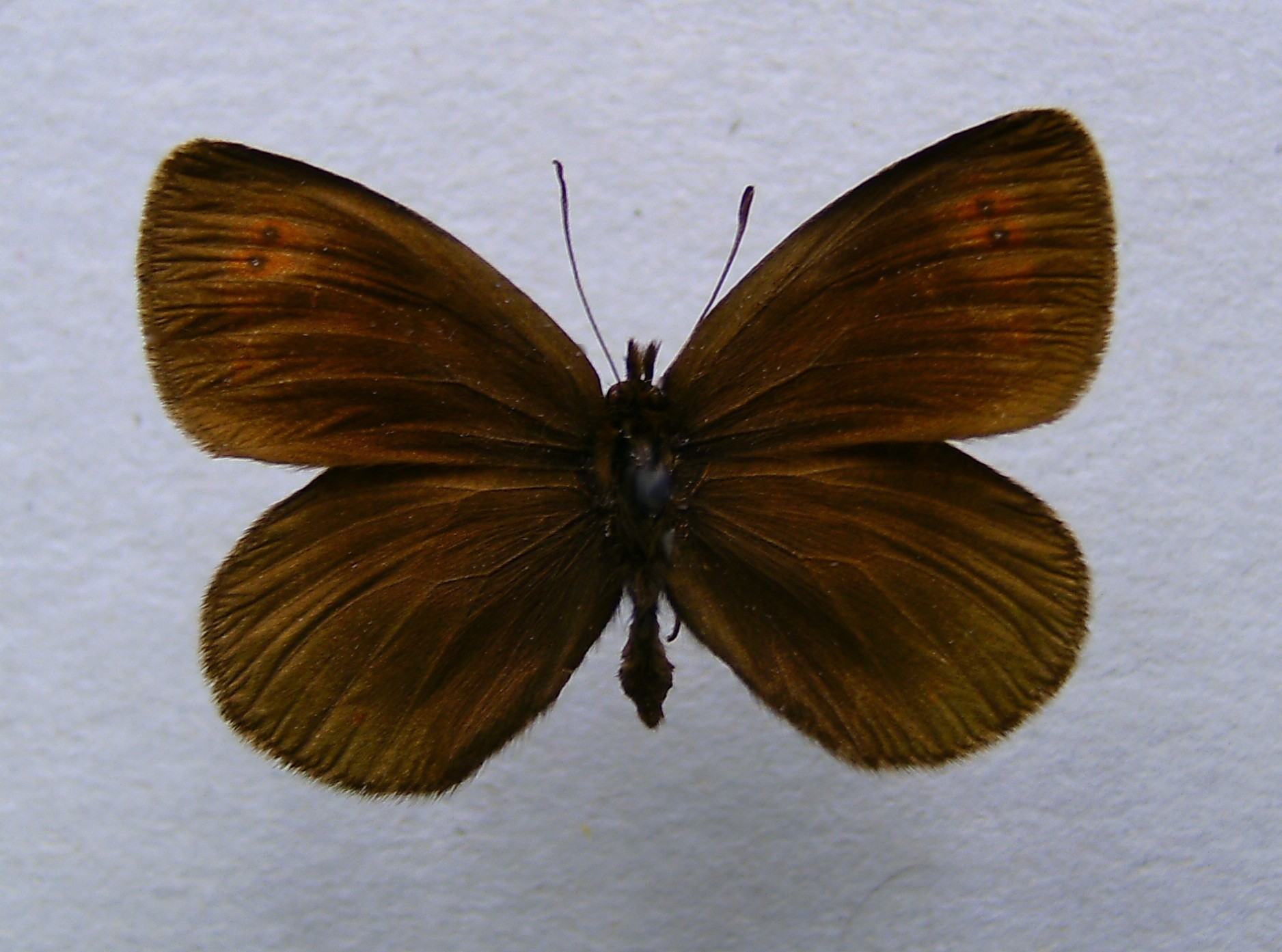
Erebia stirius

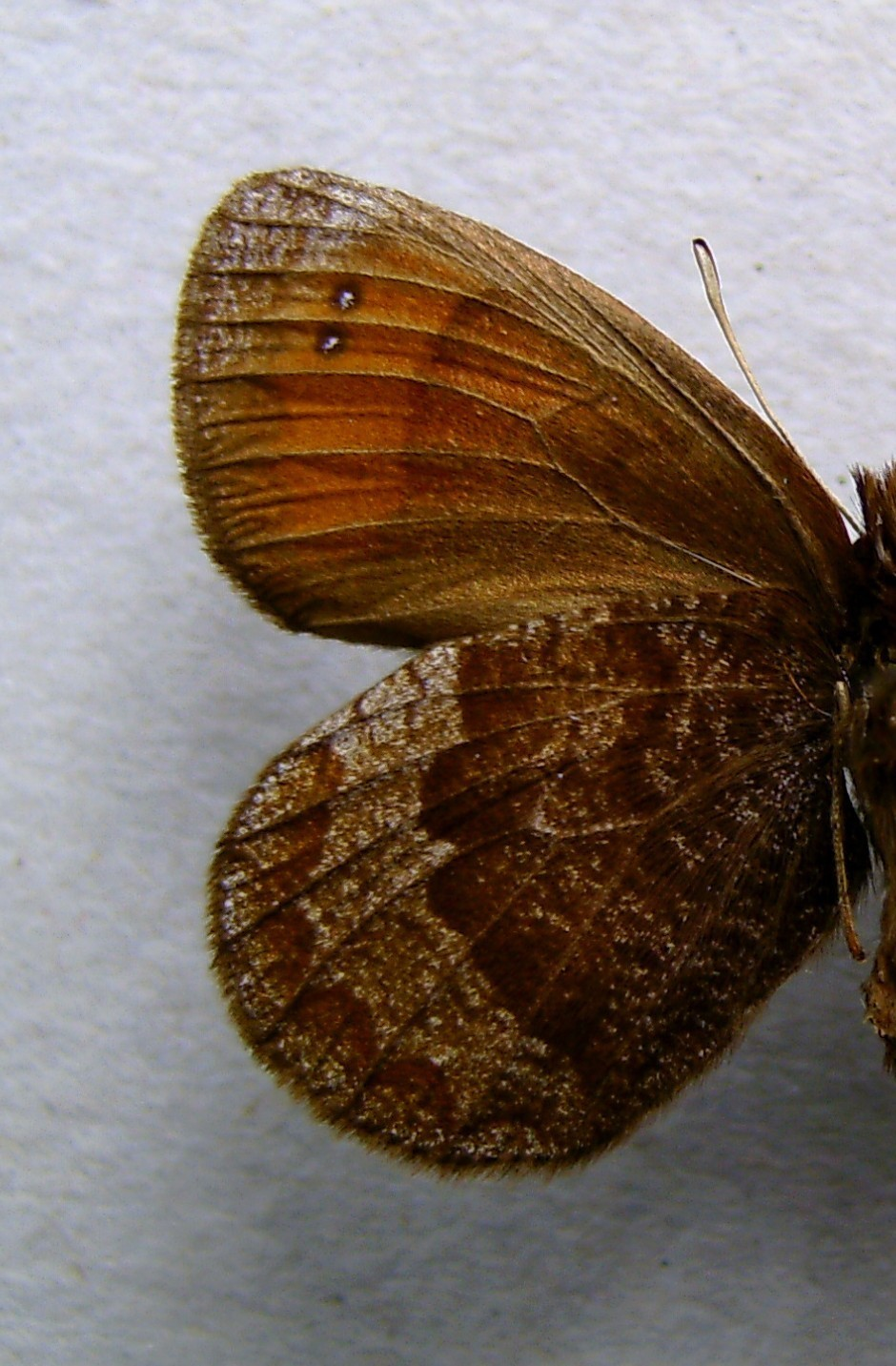
Erebia stirius
underside

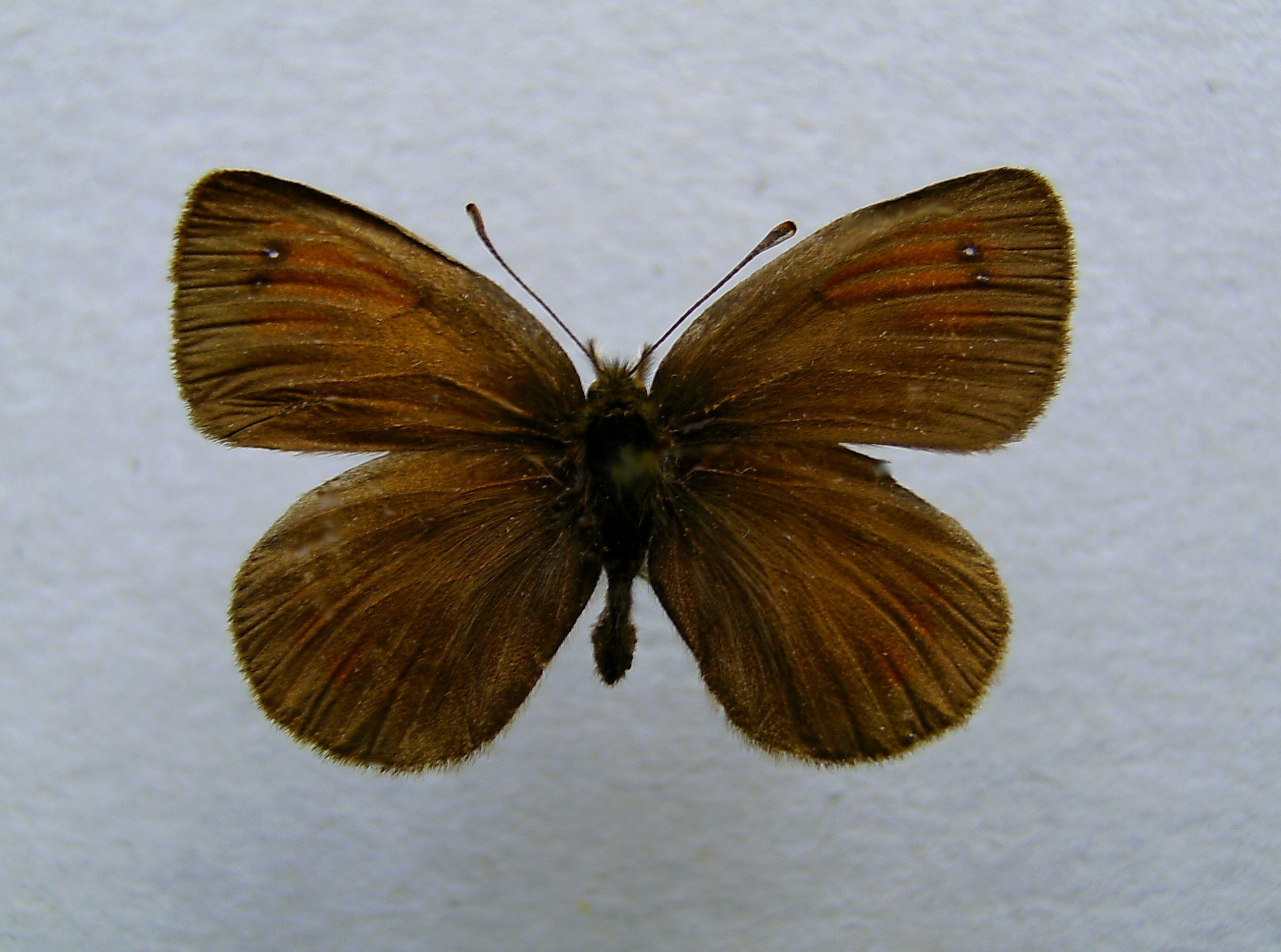
Erebia nivalis

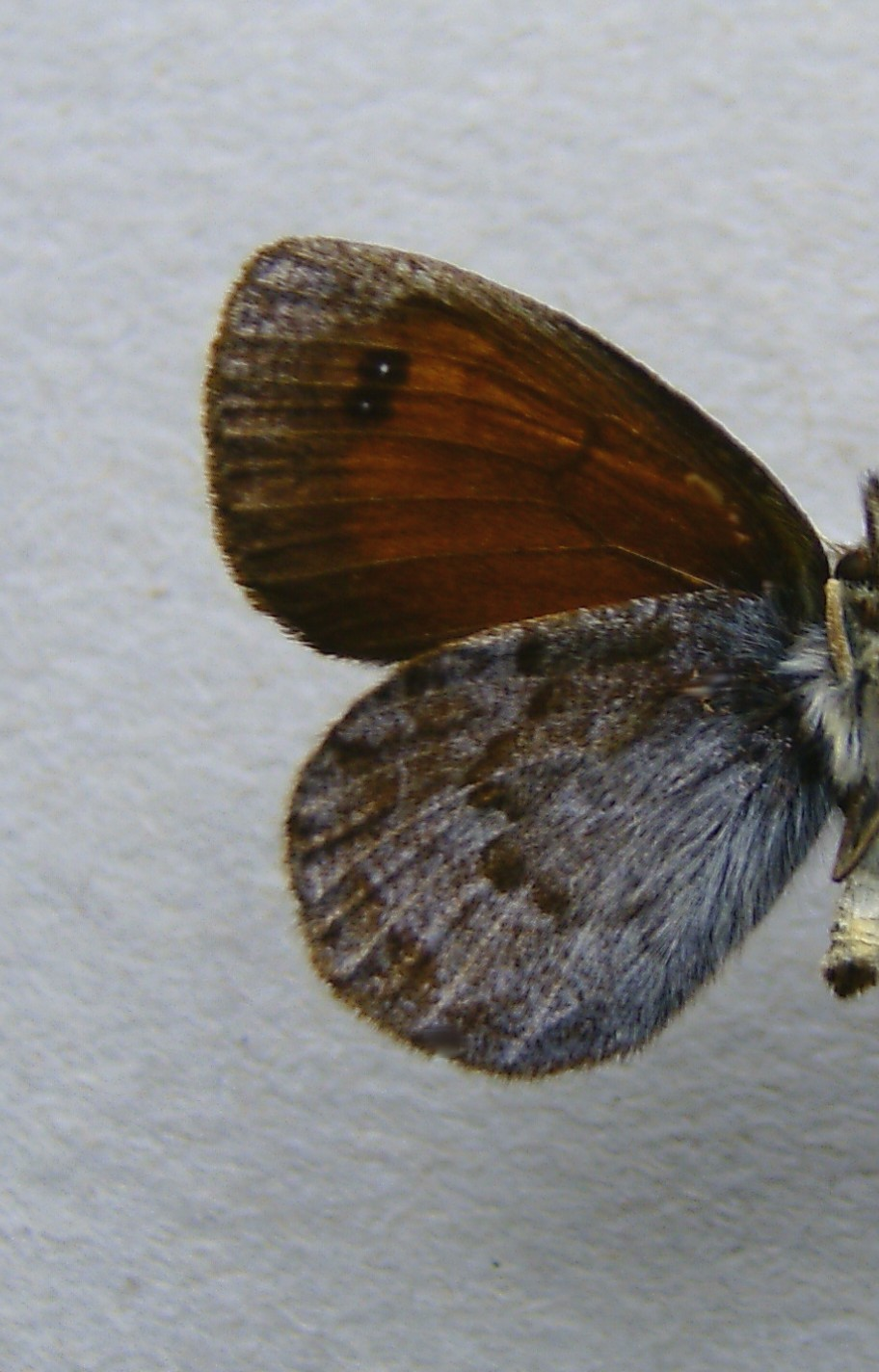
Erebia nivalis
underside

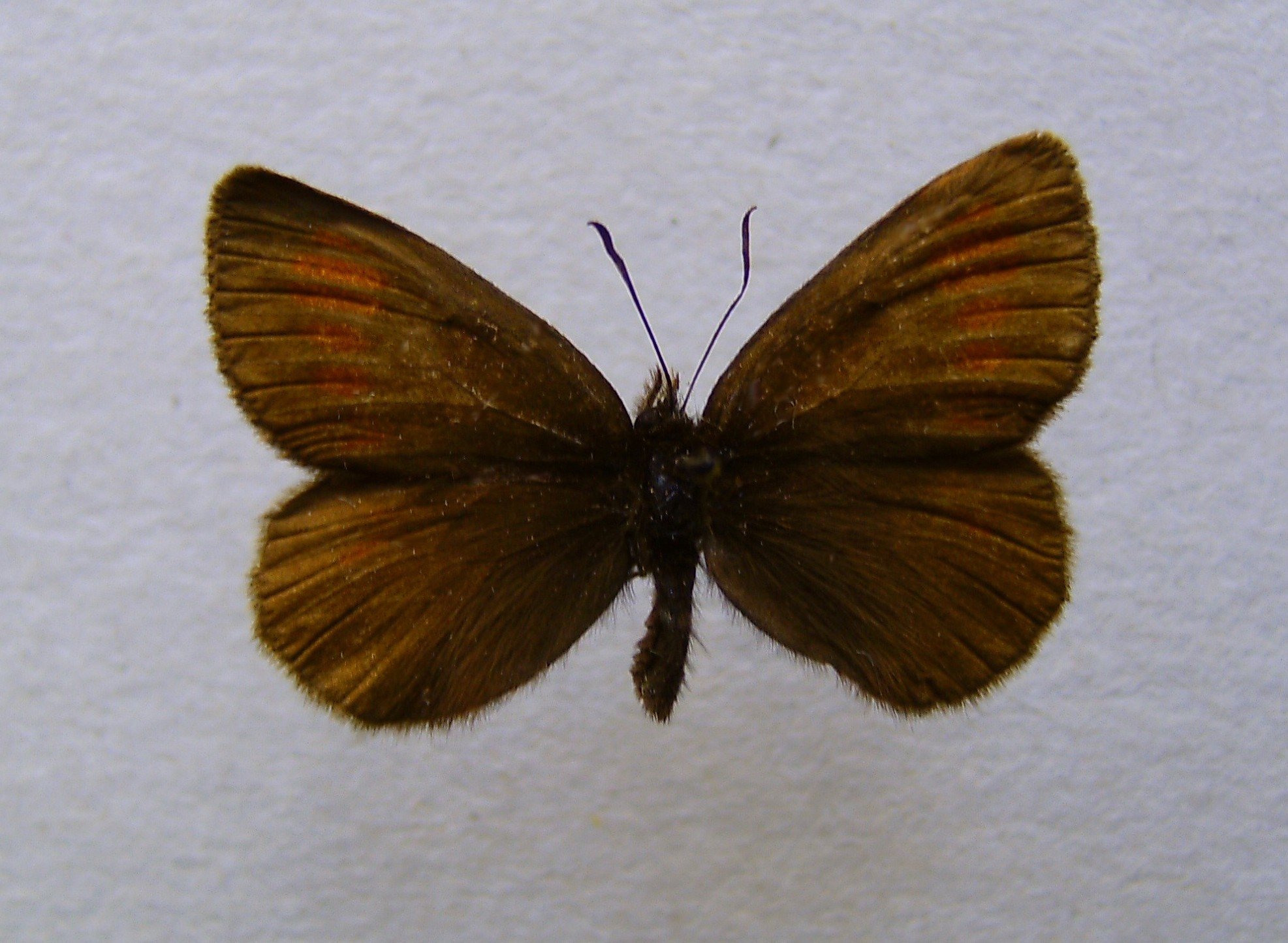
Erebia manto ♂

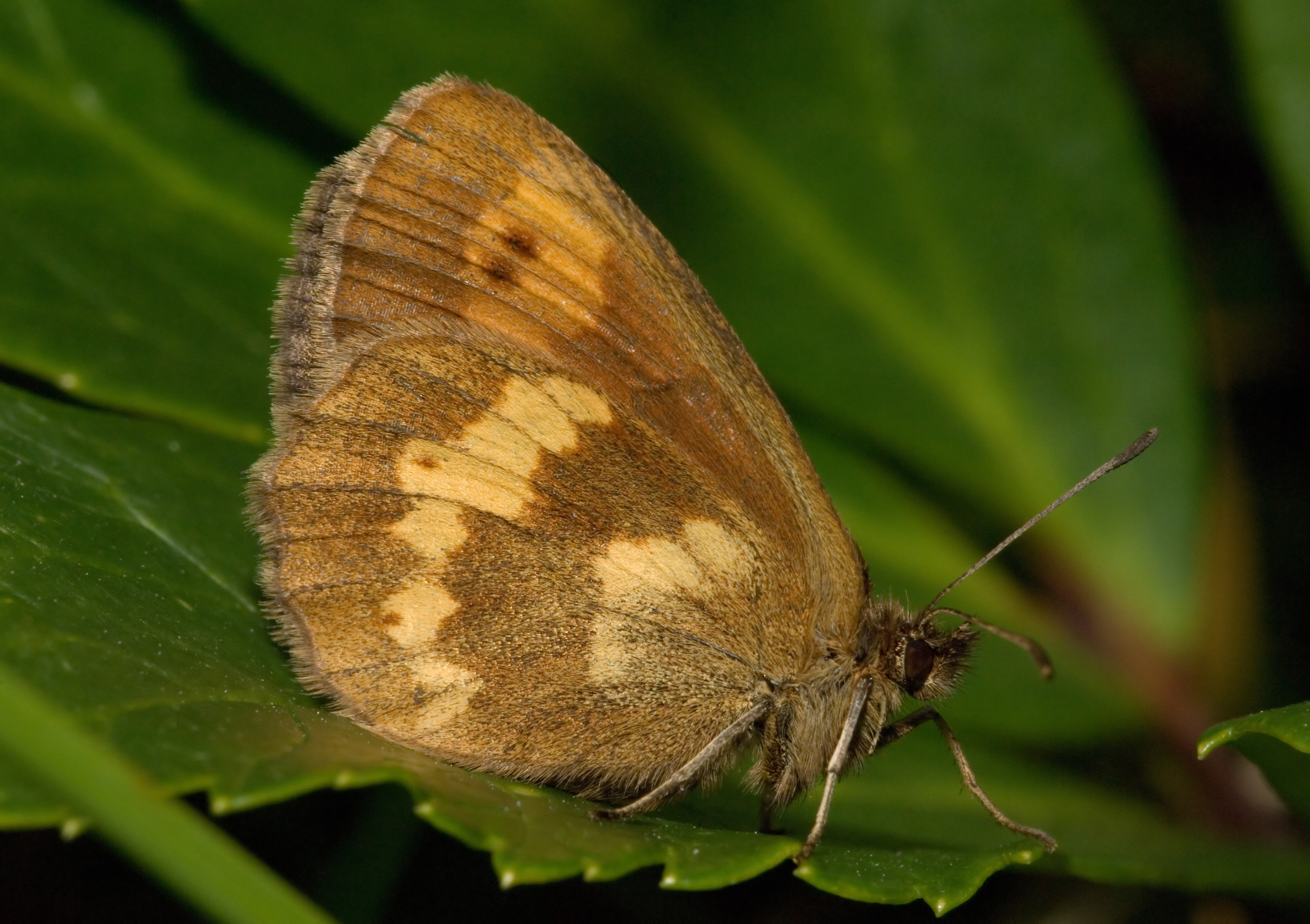
Erebia manto
underside ♀

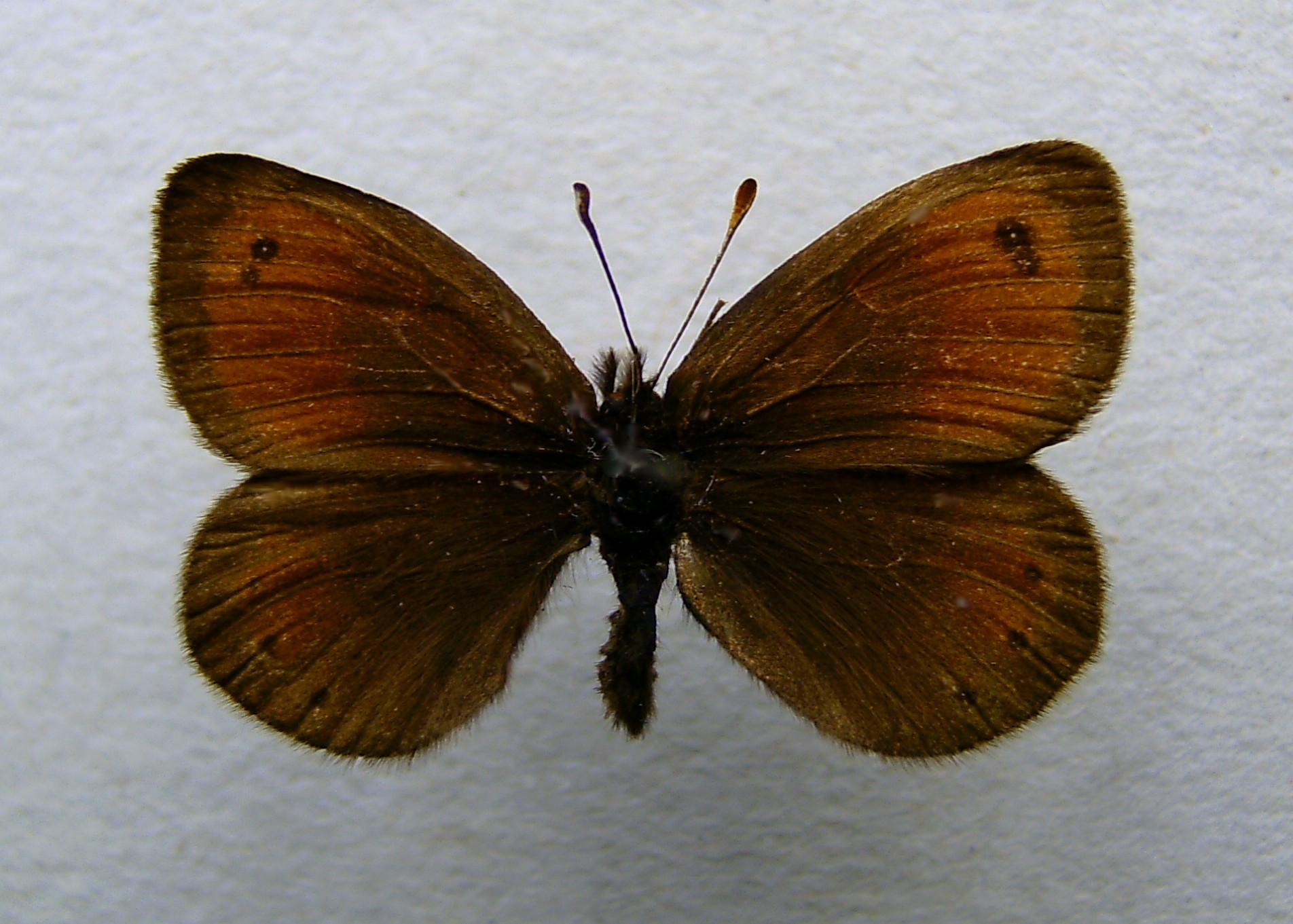
Erebia gorge

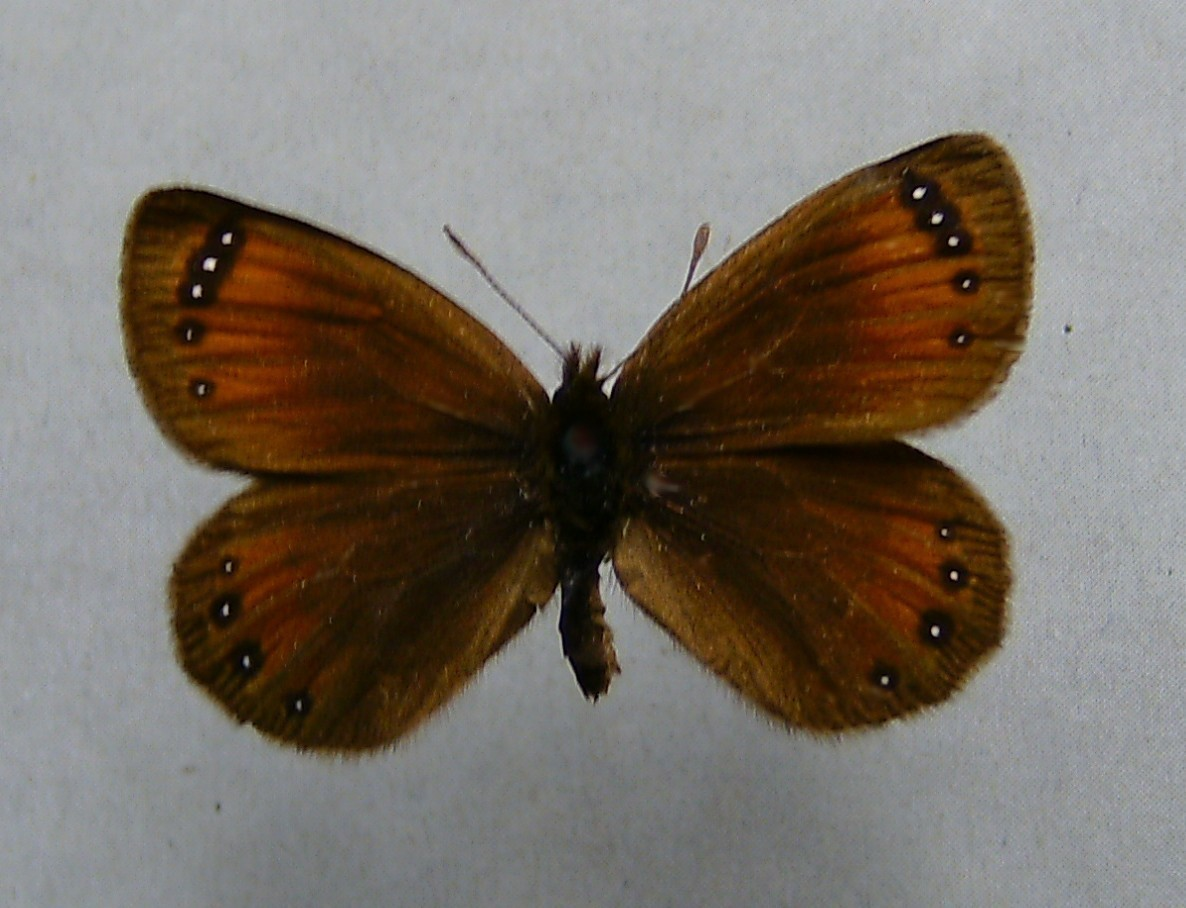
Erebia gorge f. triopes

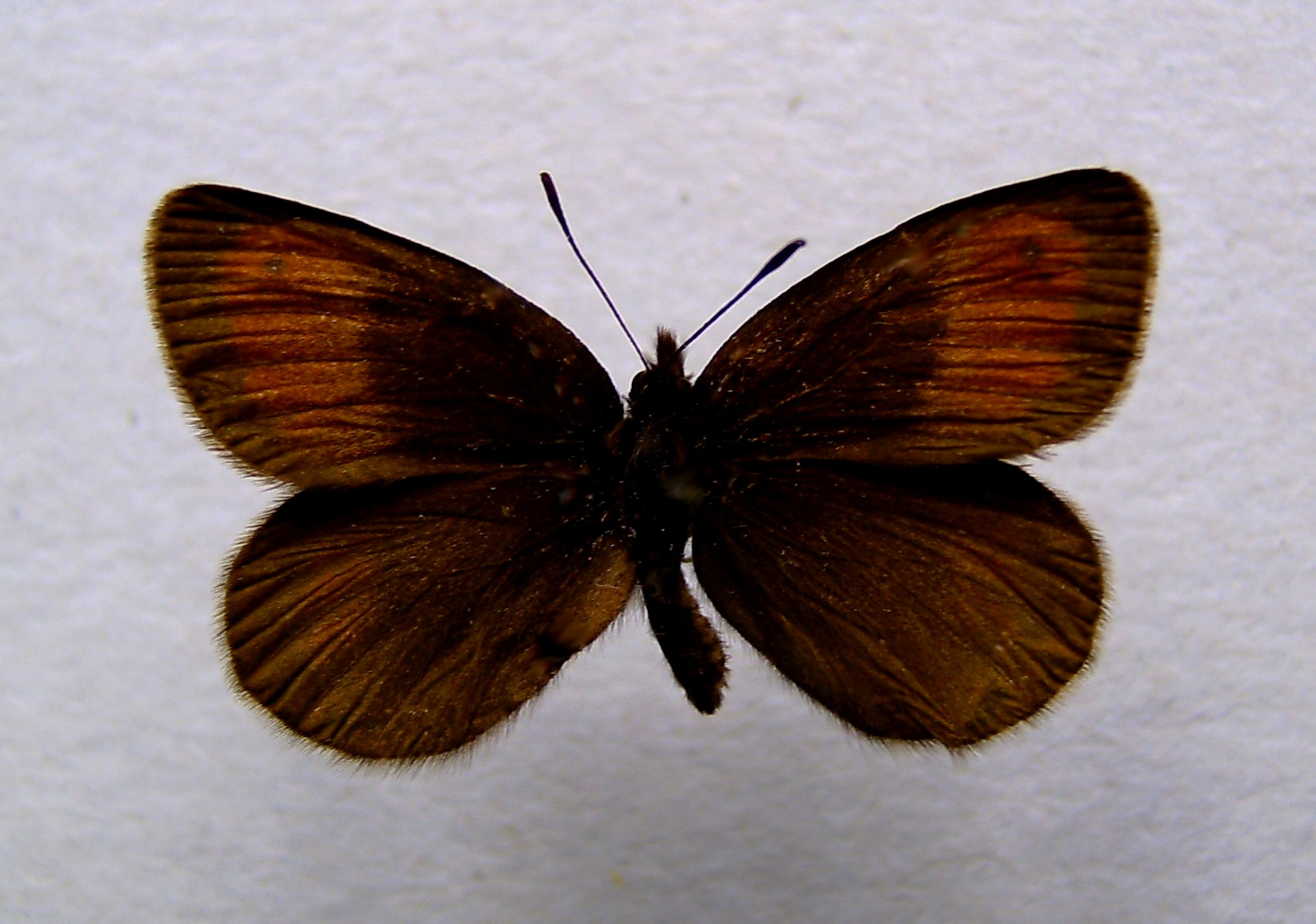
Erebia gorge f. erynis

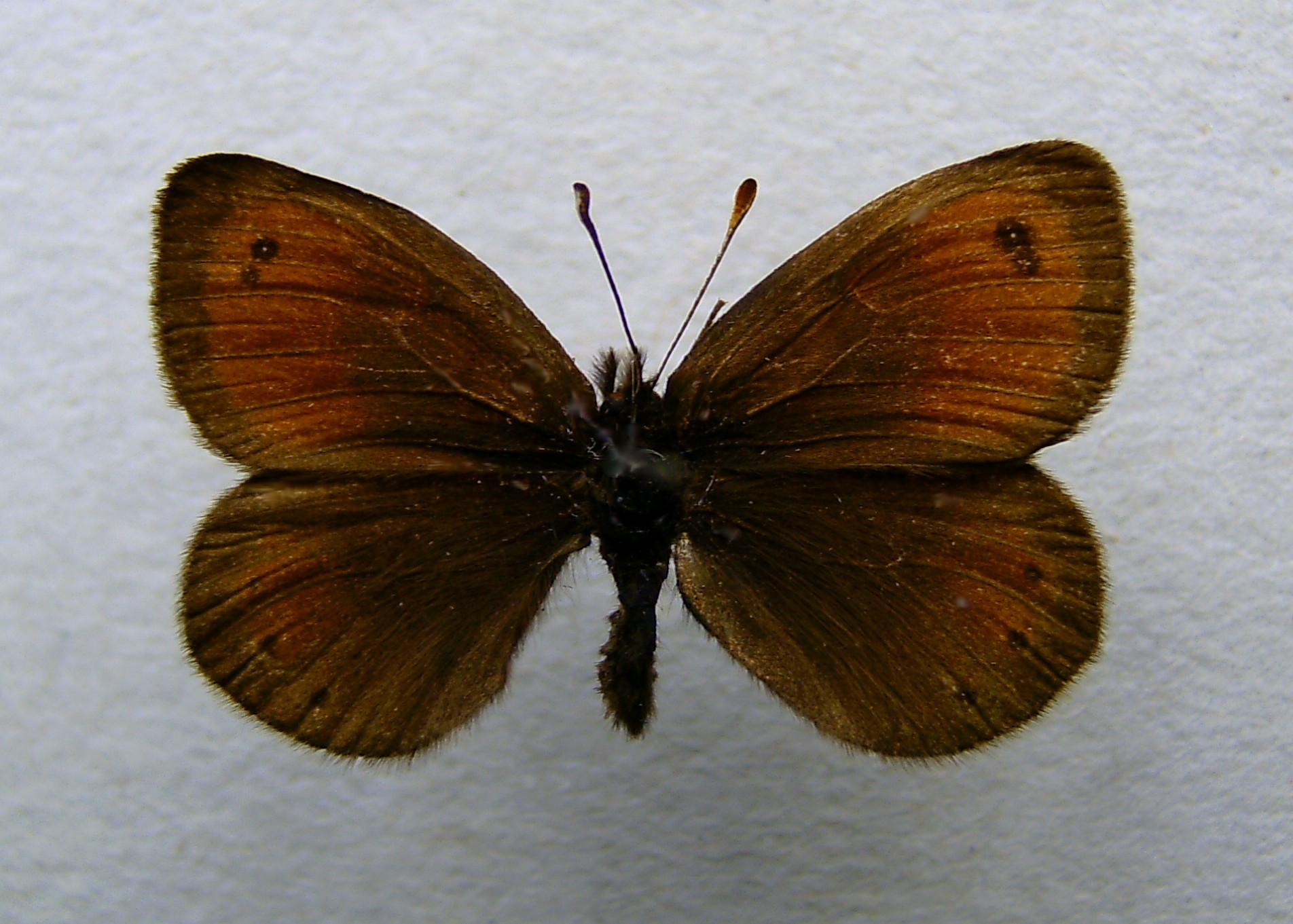
Erebia gorge
underside

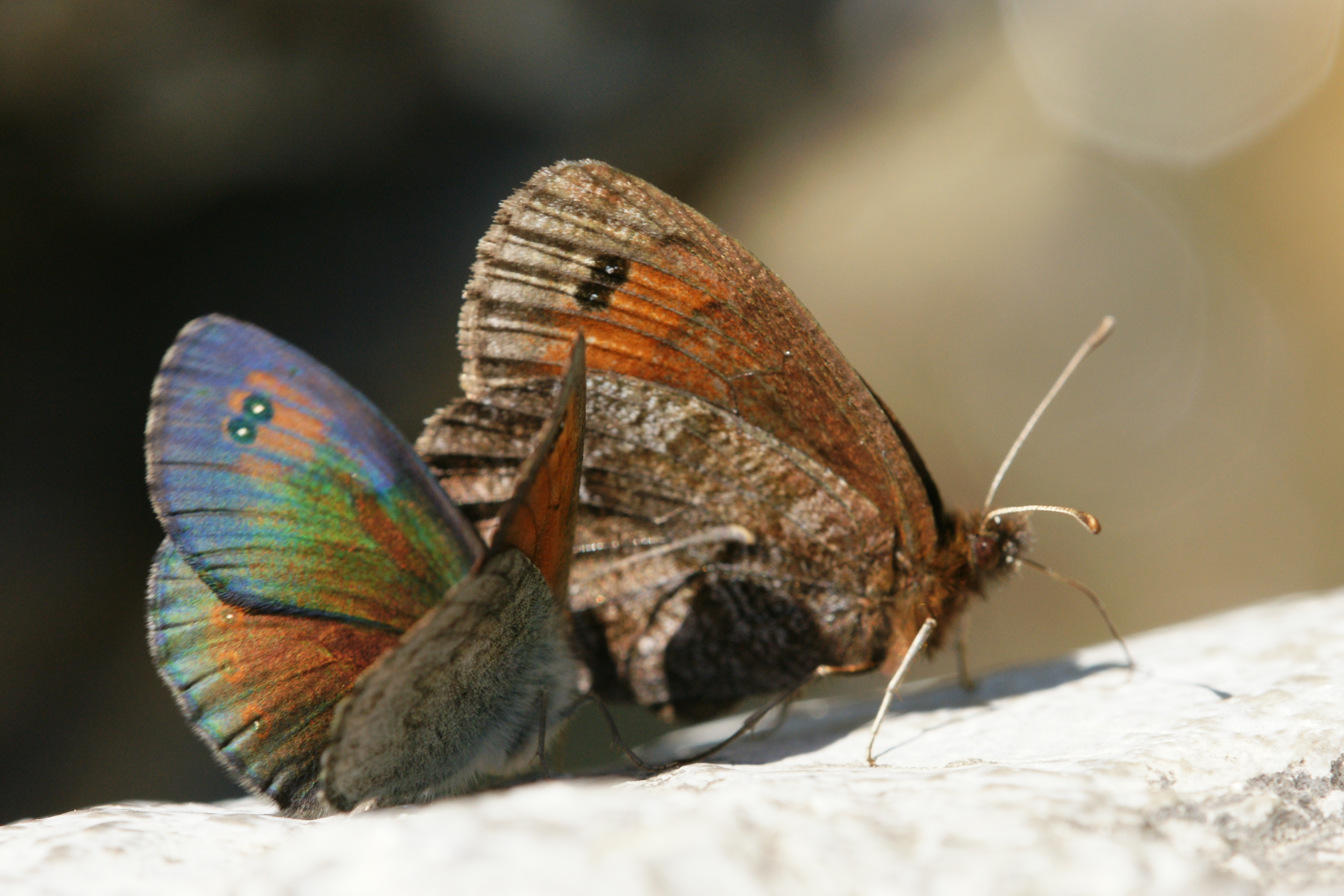
Erebia tyndarus

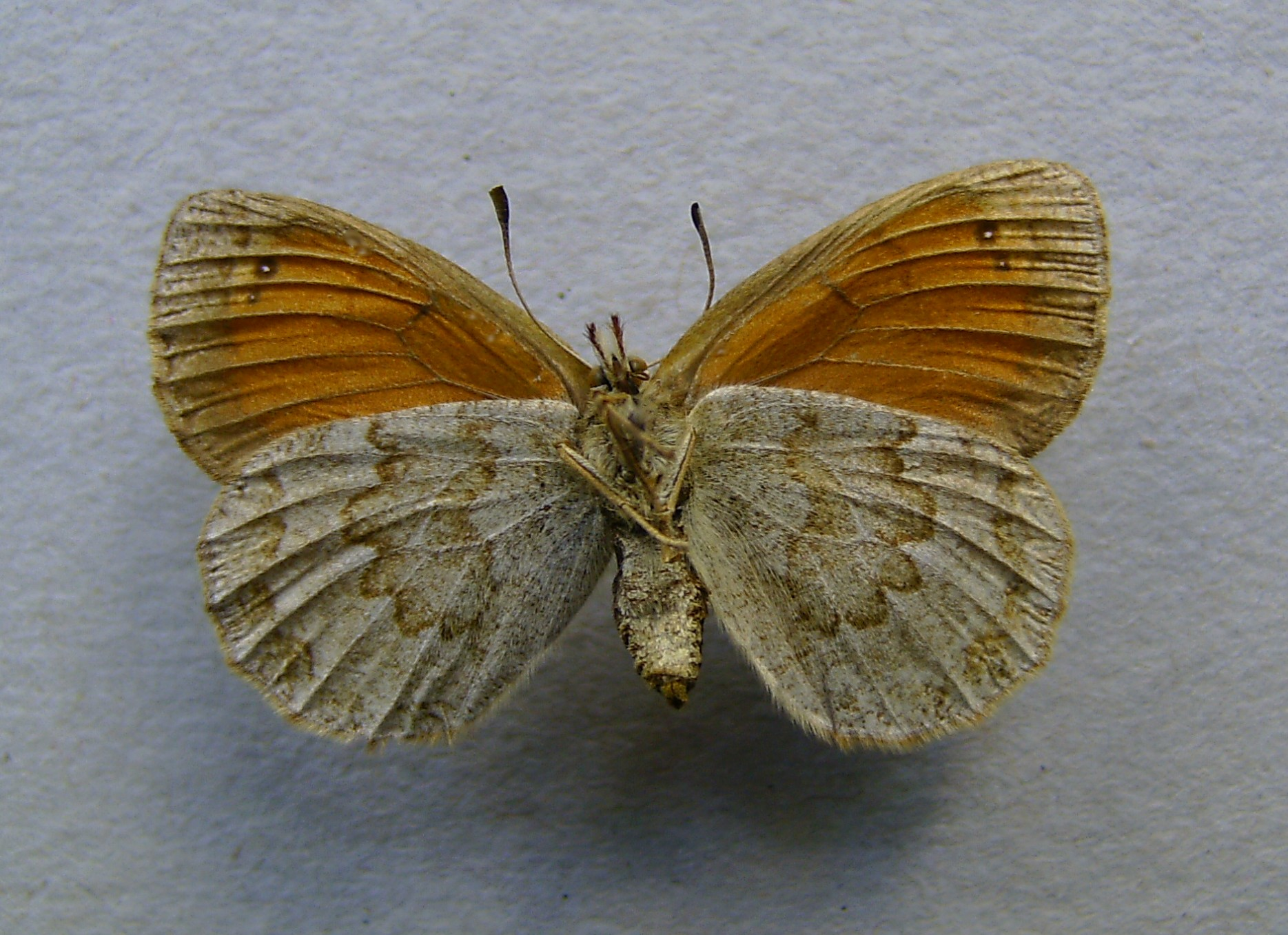
Erebia tyndarus
underside

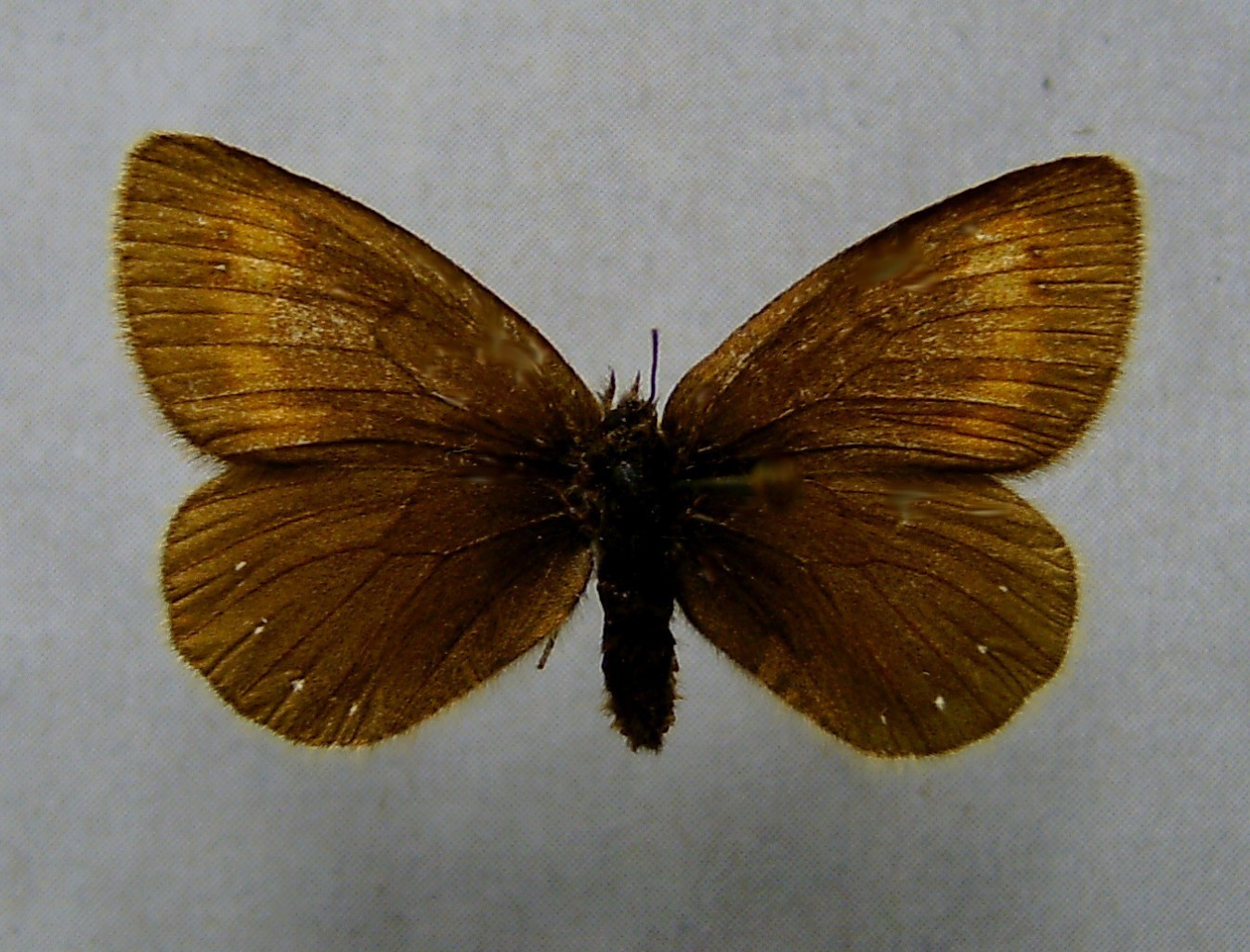
Erebia claudina

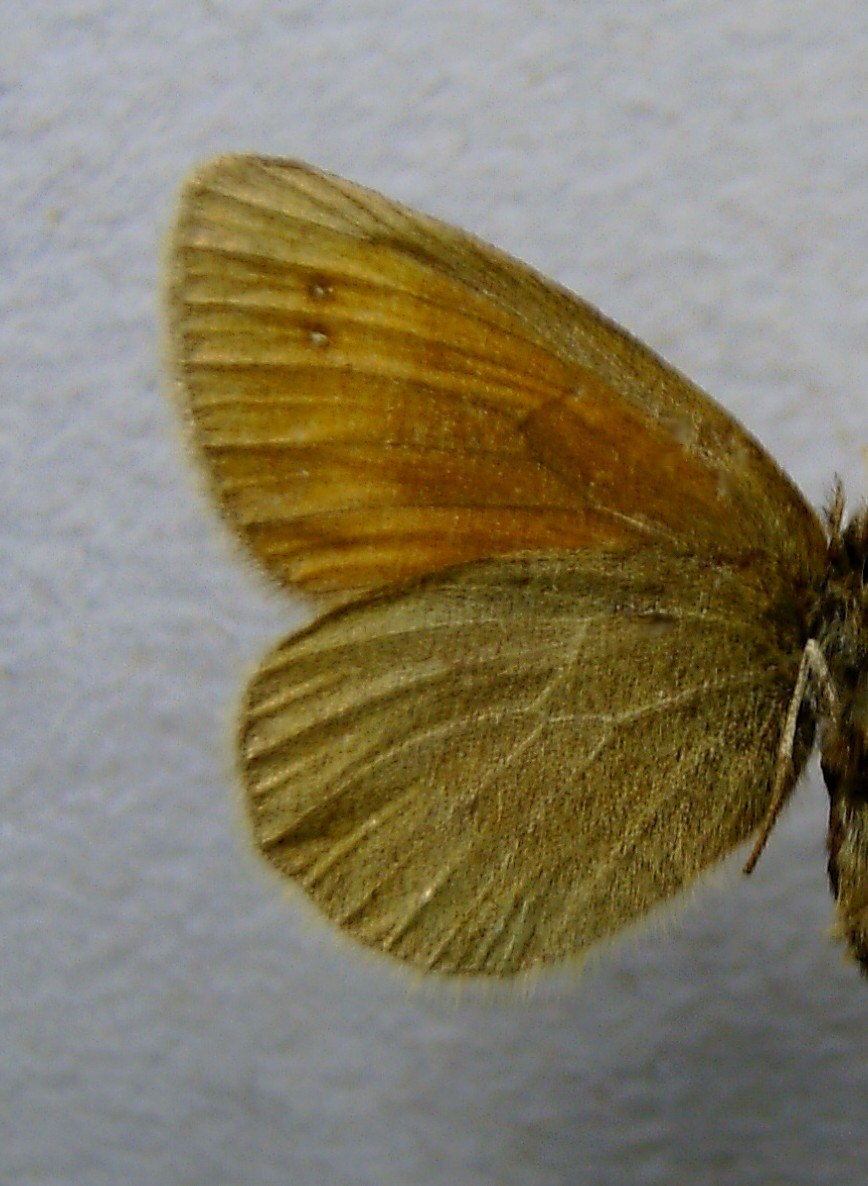
Erebia claudina
underside

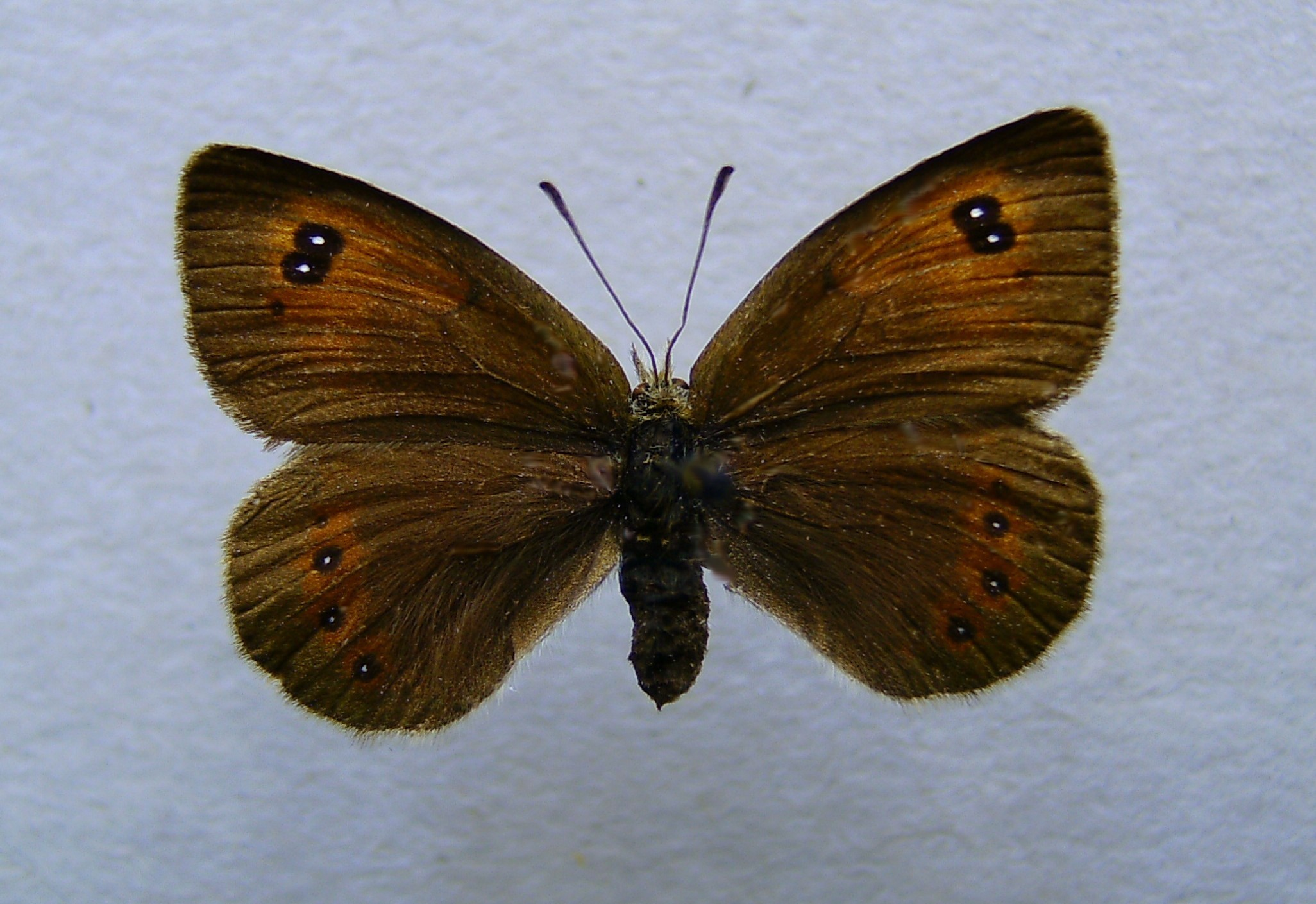
Erebia cassioides

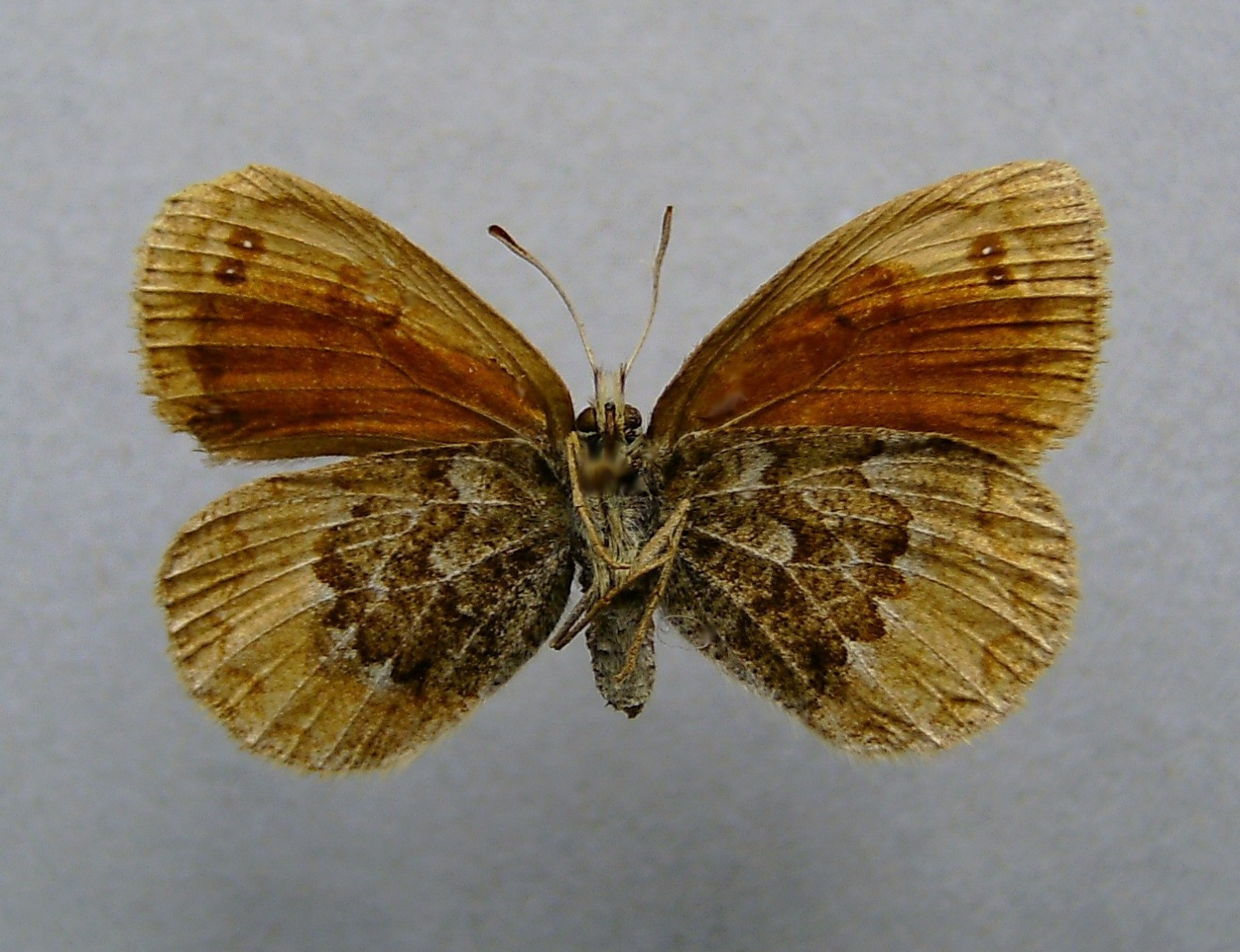
Erebia cassioides
underside ♀

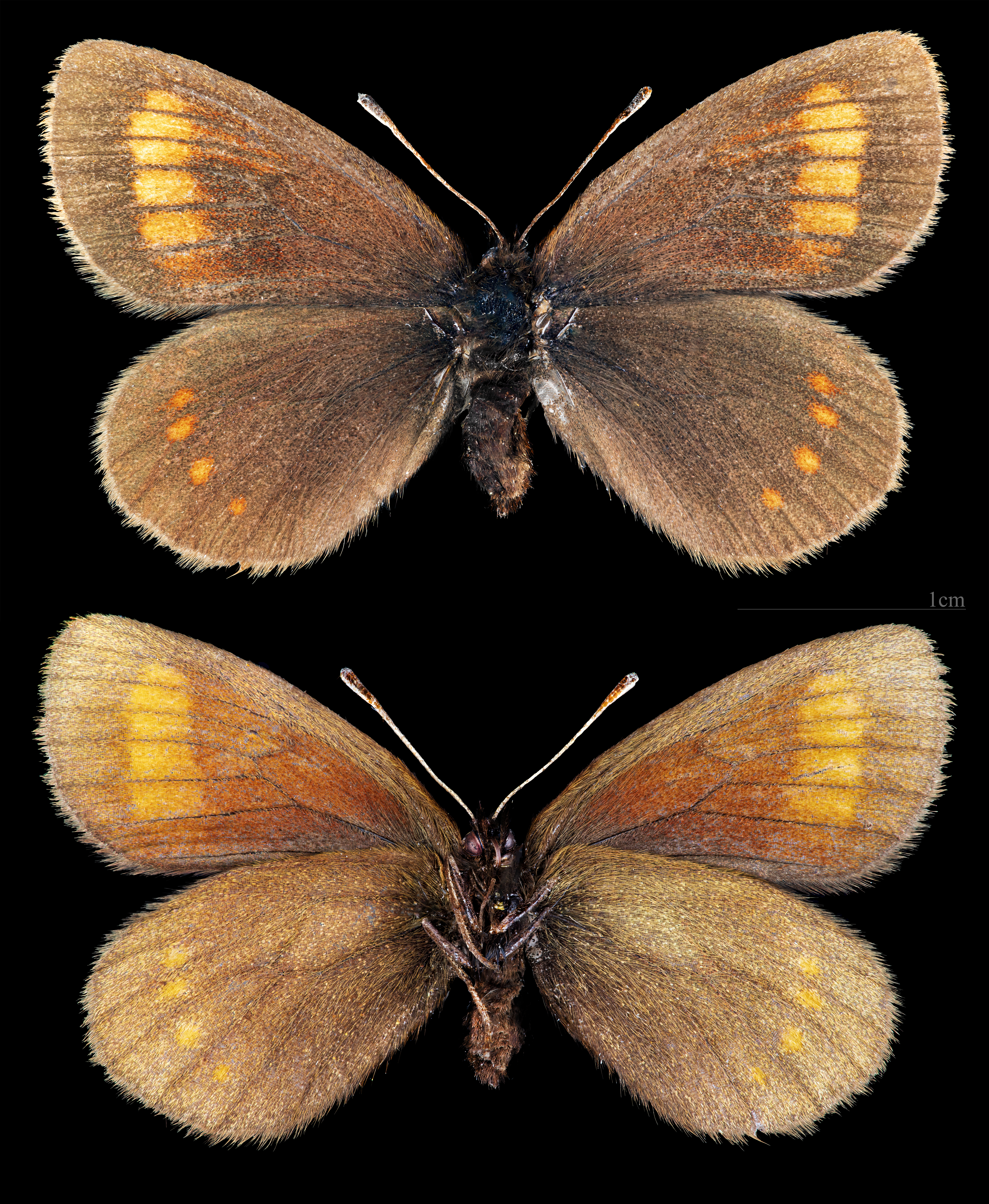
Erebia pharte♀

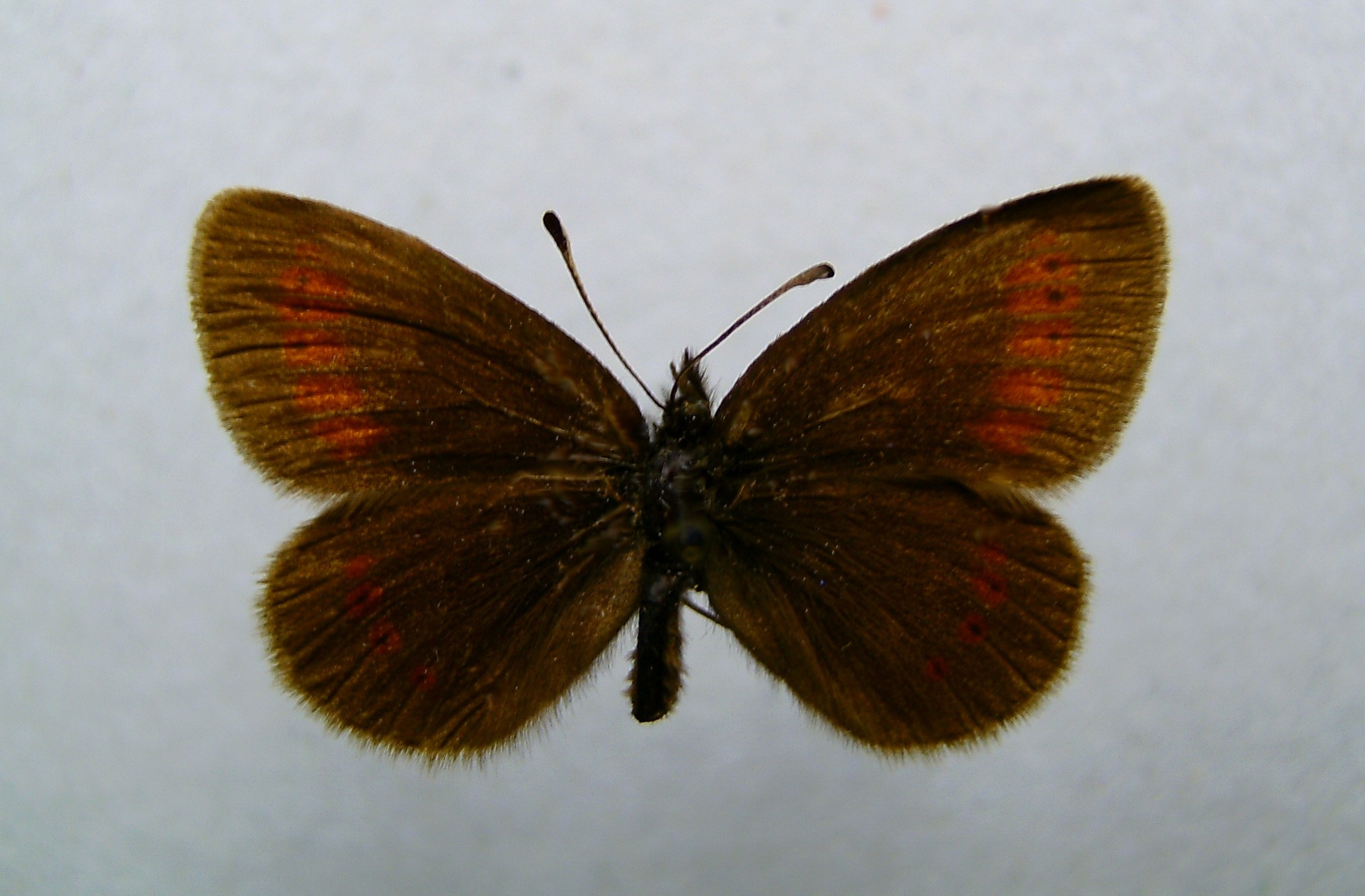
Erebia melampus

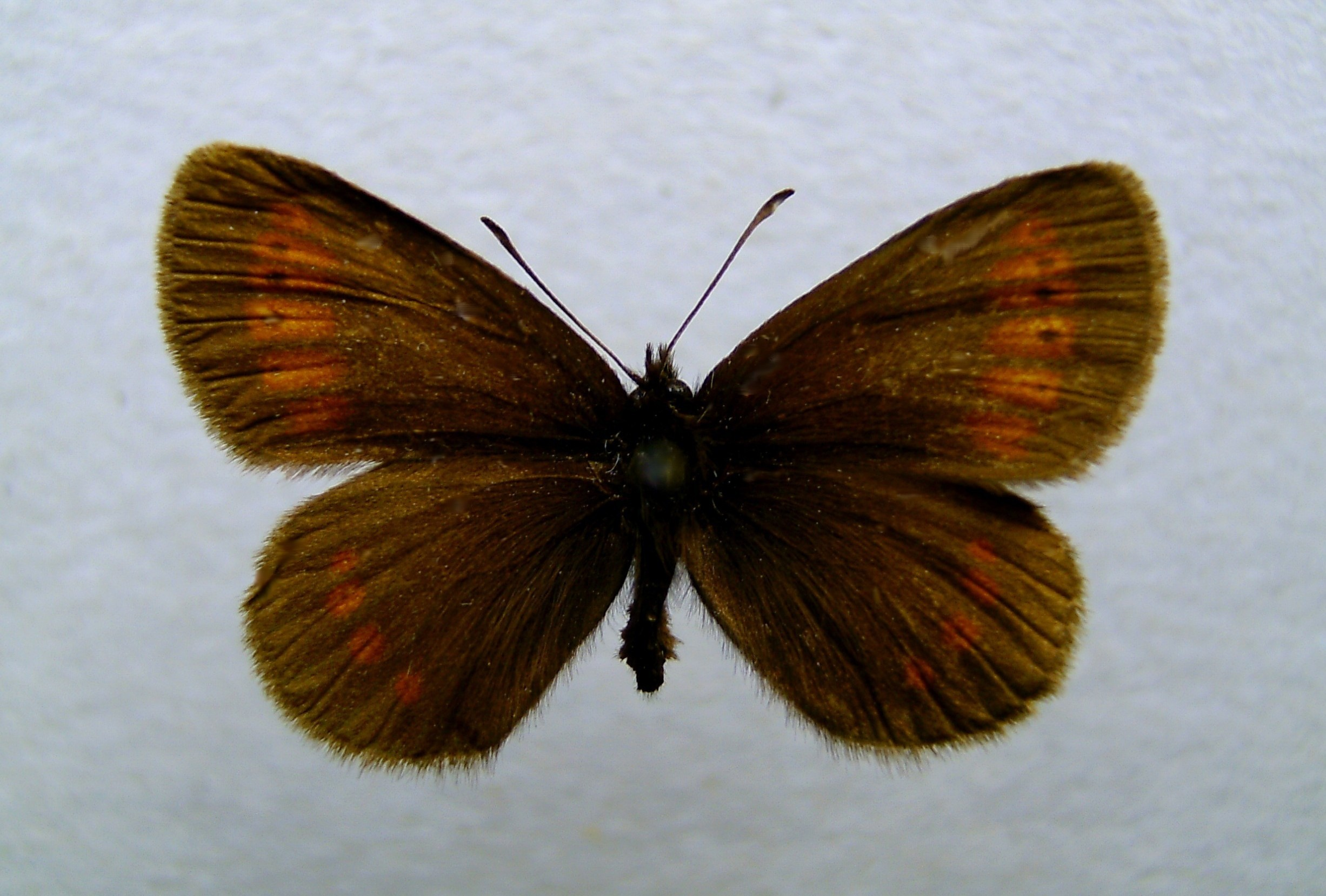
Erebia sudetica

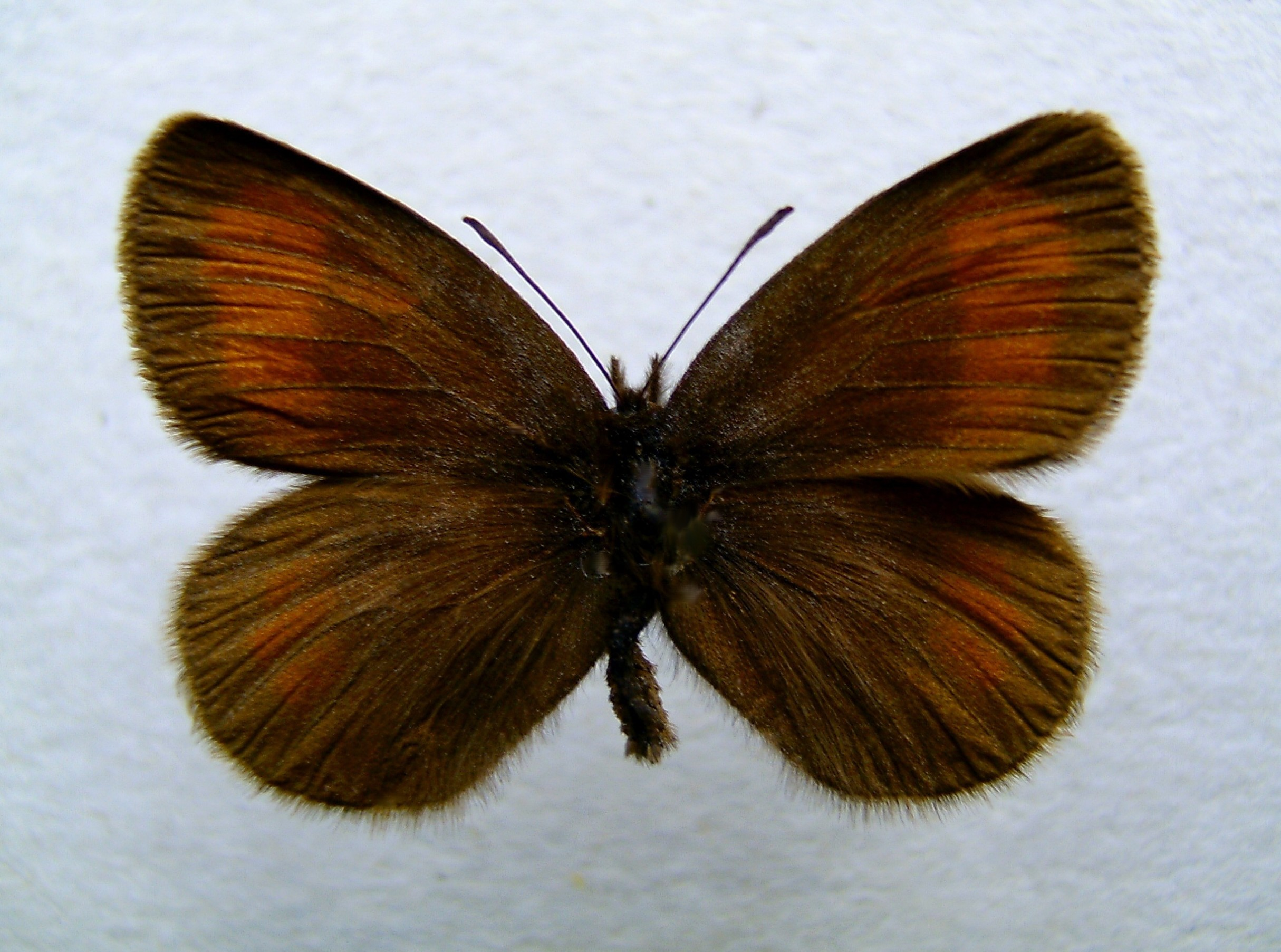
Erebia mnestra

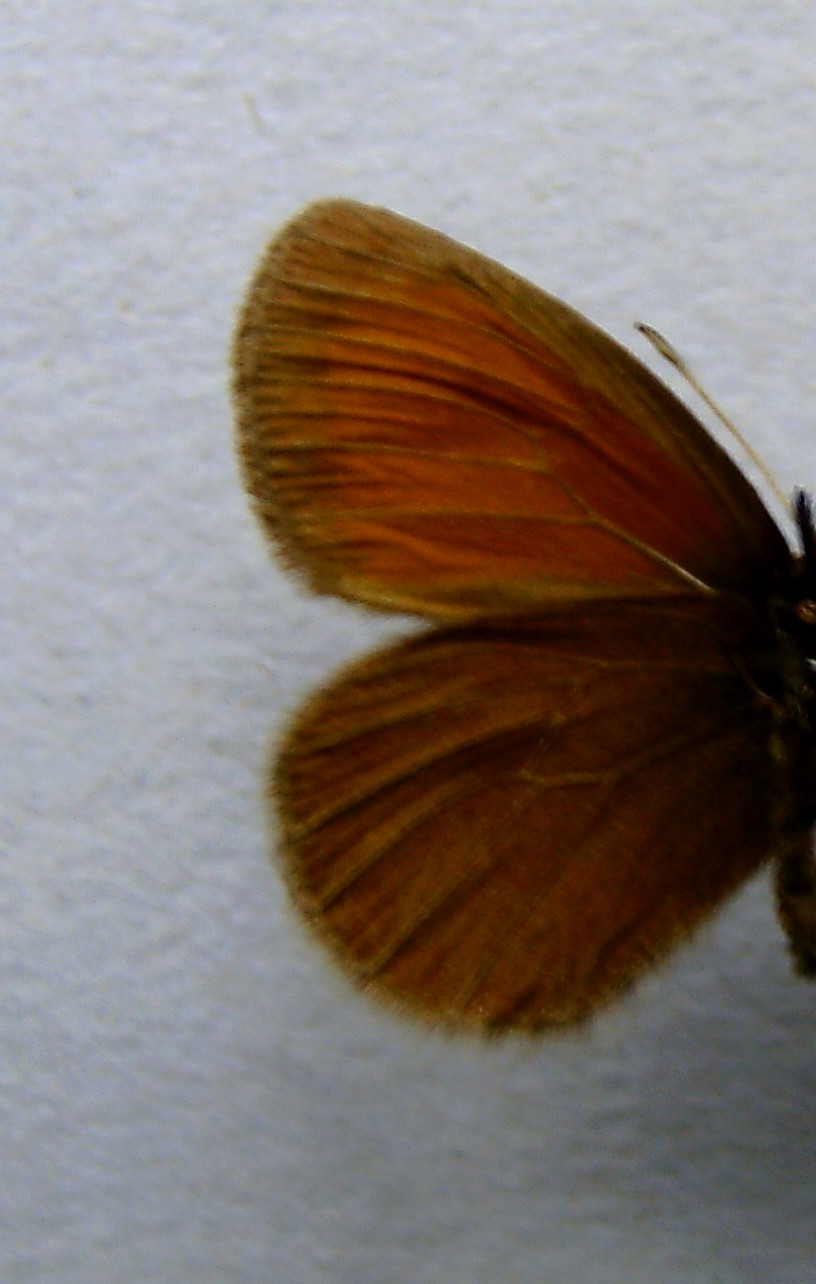
Erebia mnestra
underside

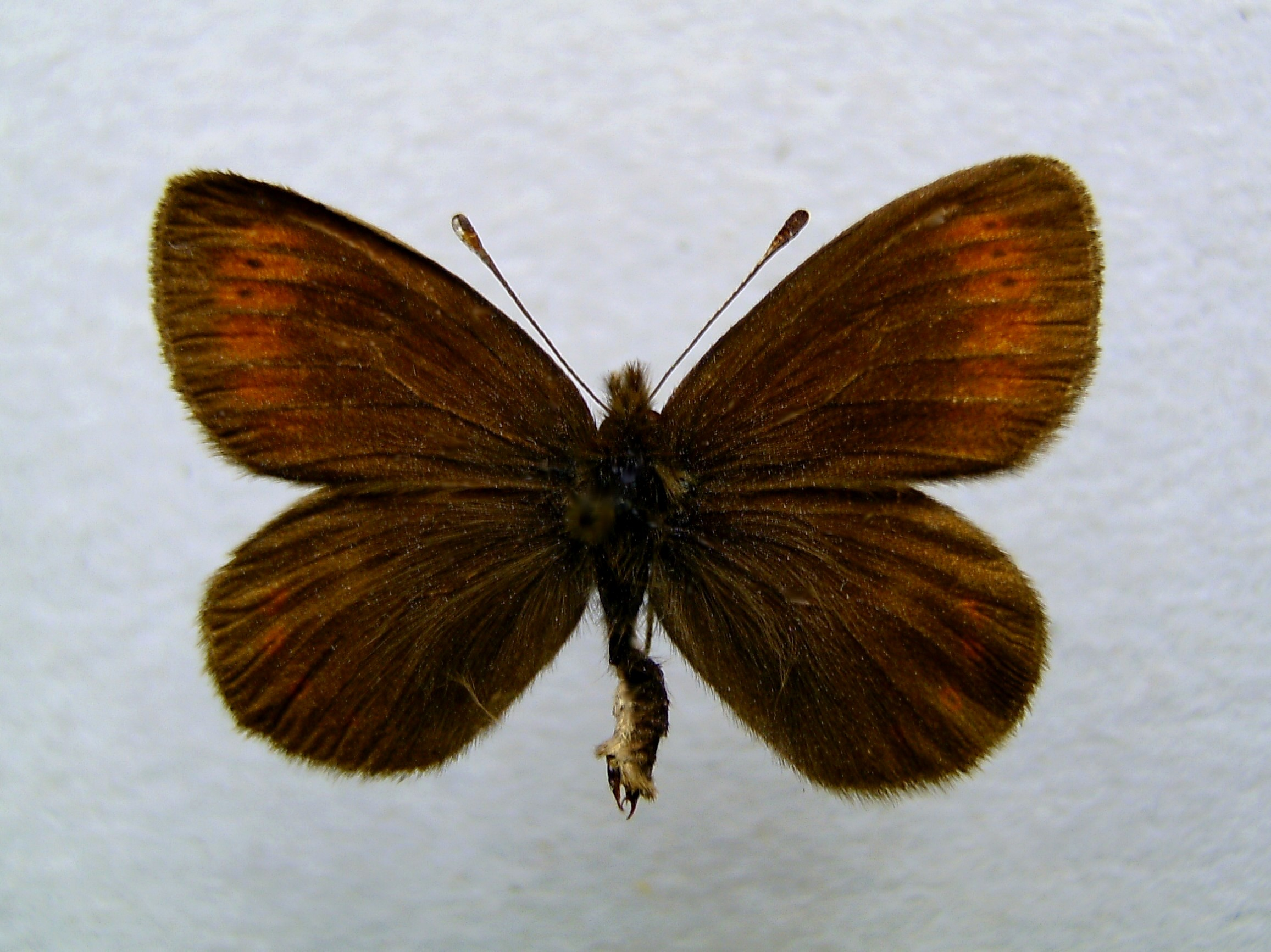
Erebia christi

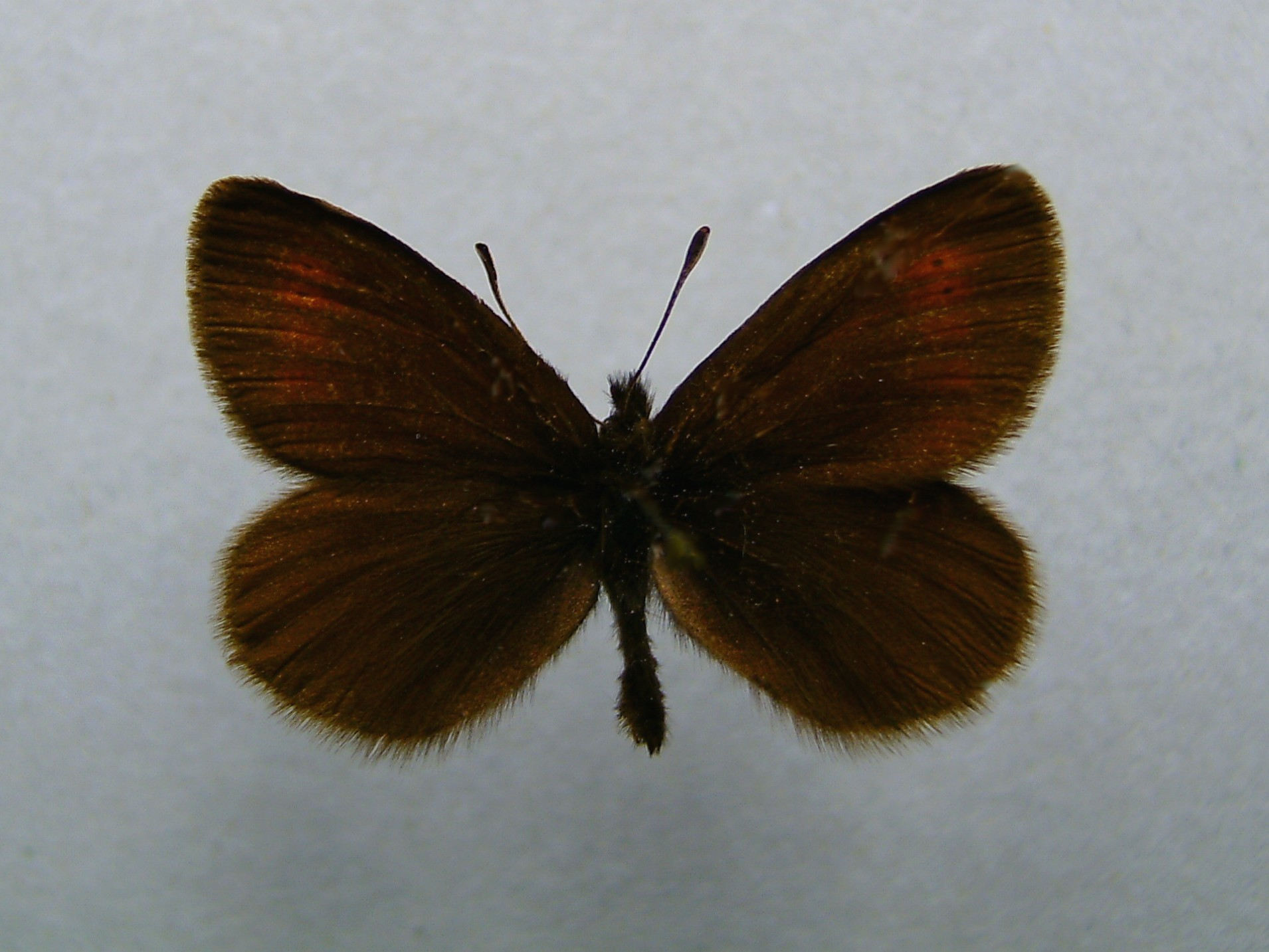
Erebia eryphile

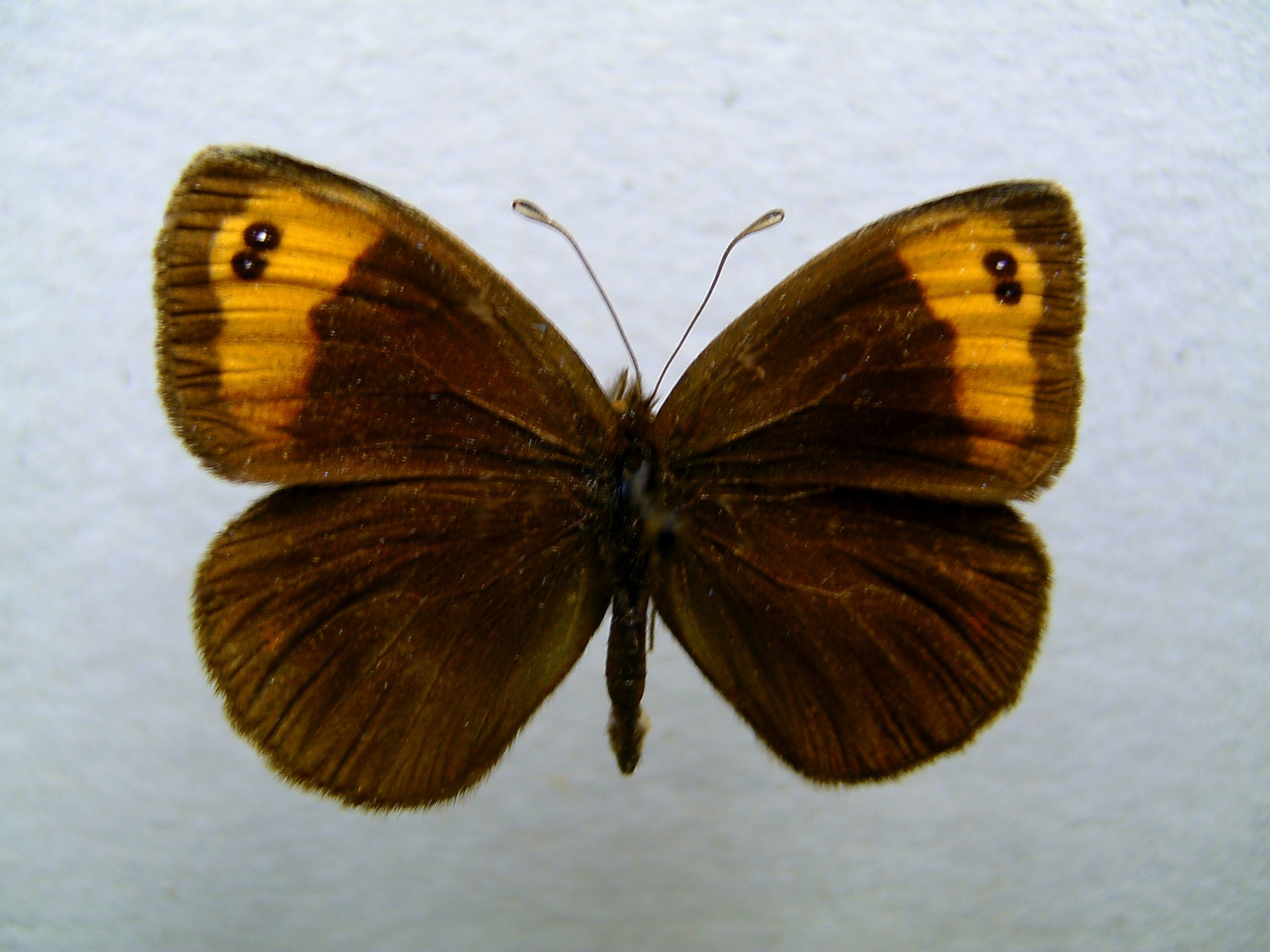
Erebia zapateri

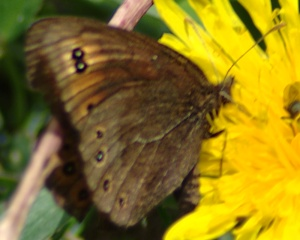
Erebia episodea

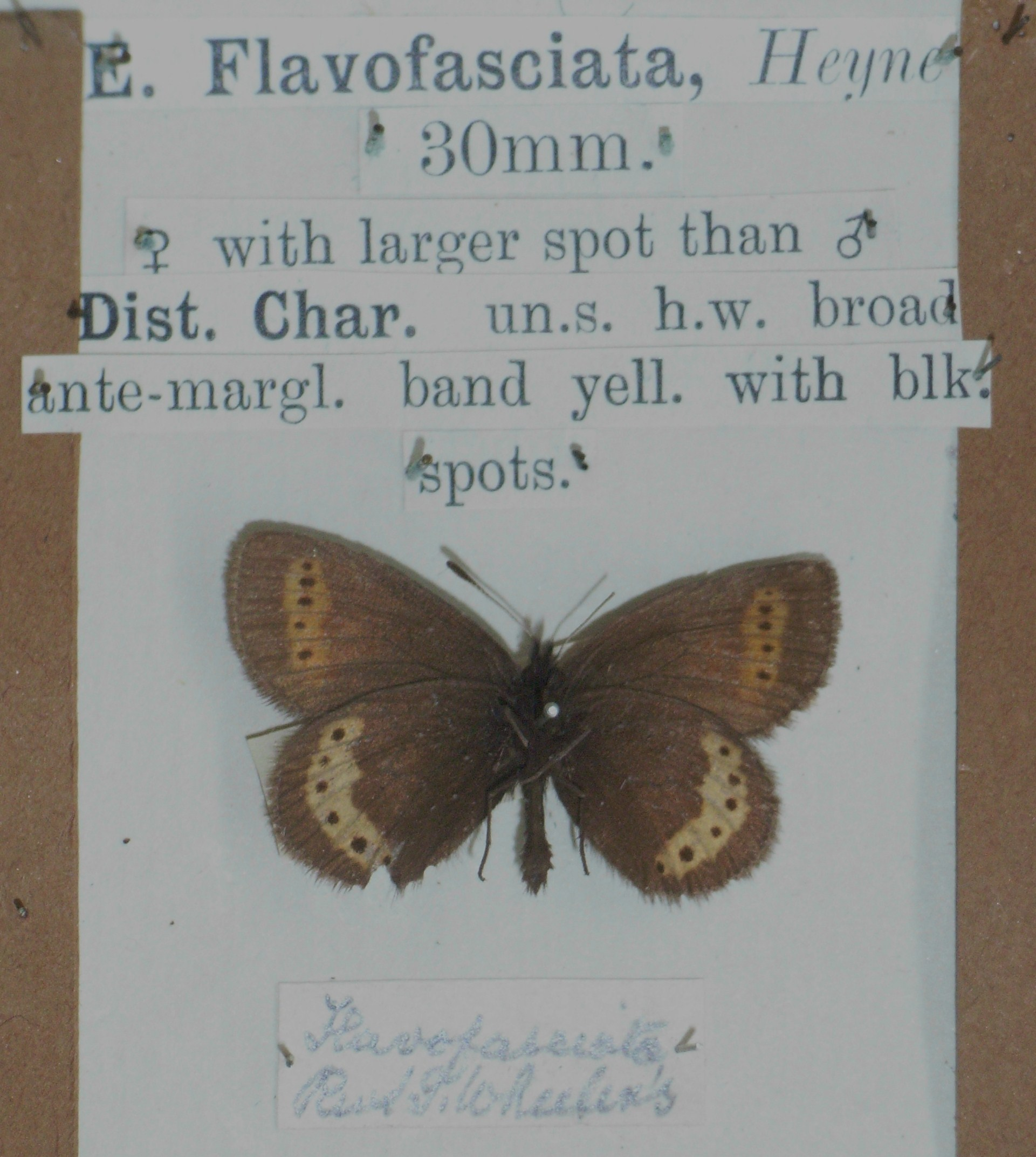
Erebia flavofasciata

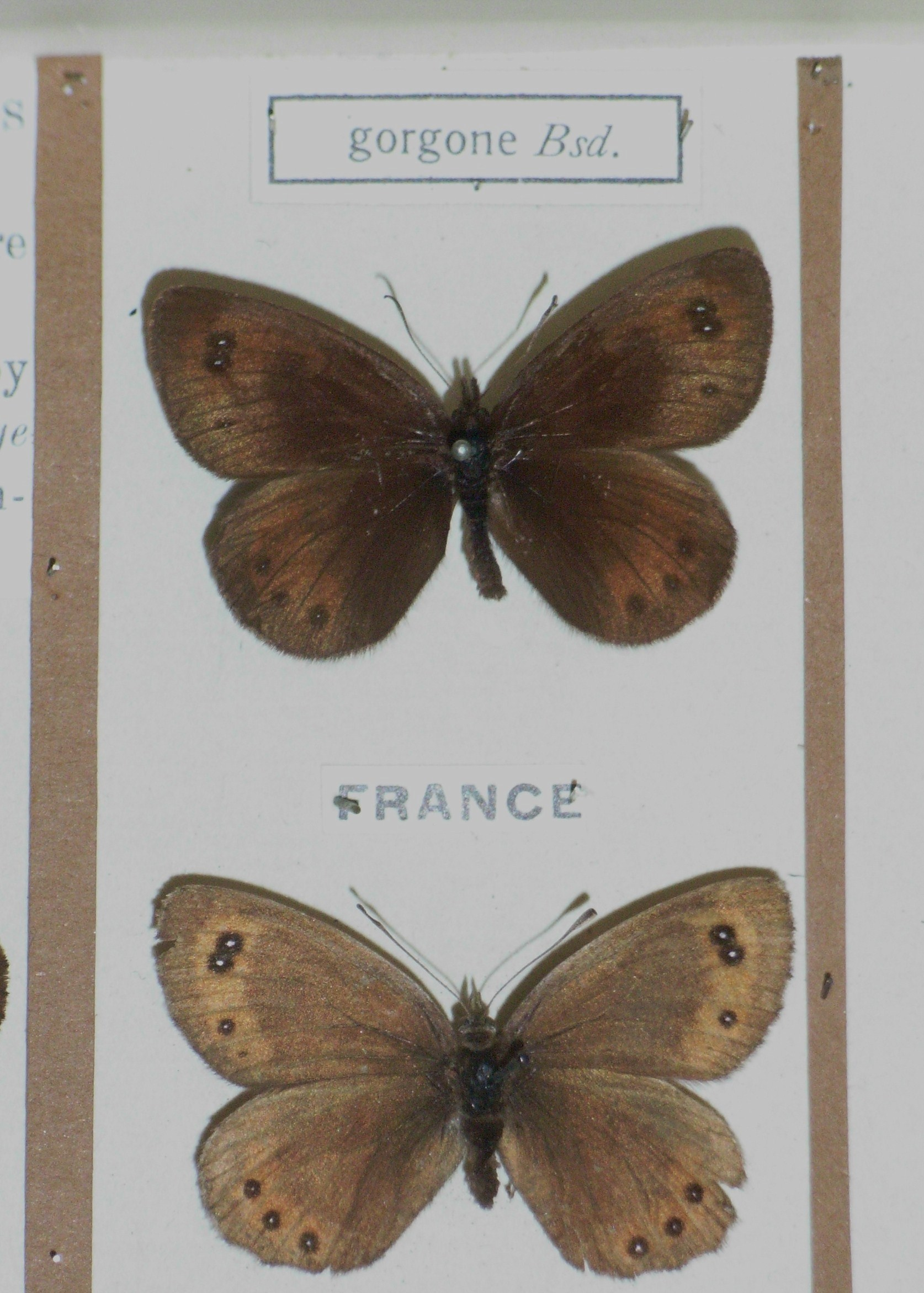
Erebia gorgone

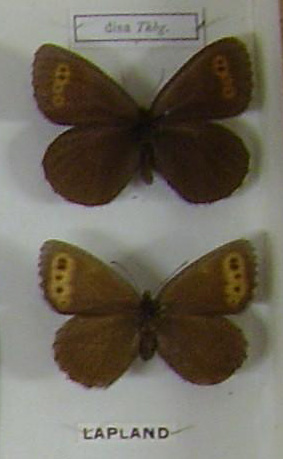
Erebia disa

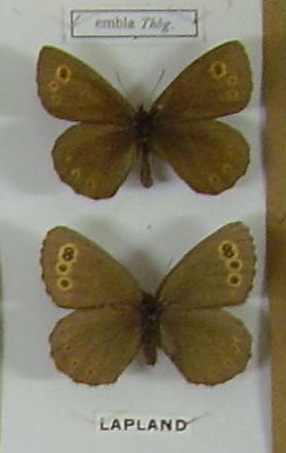
Erebia embla

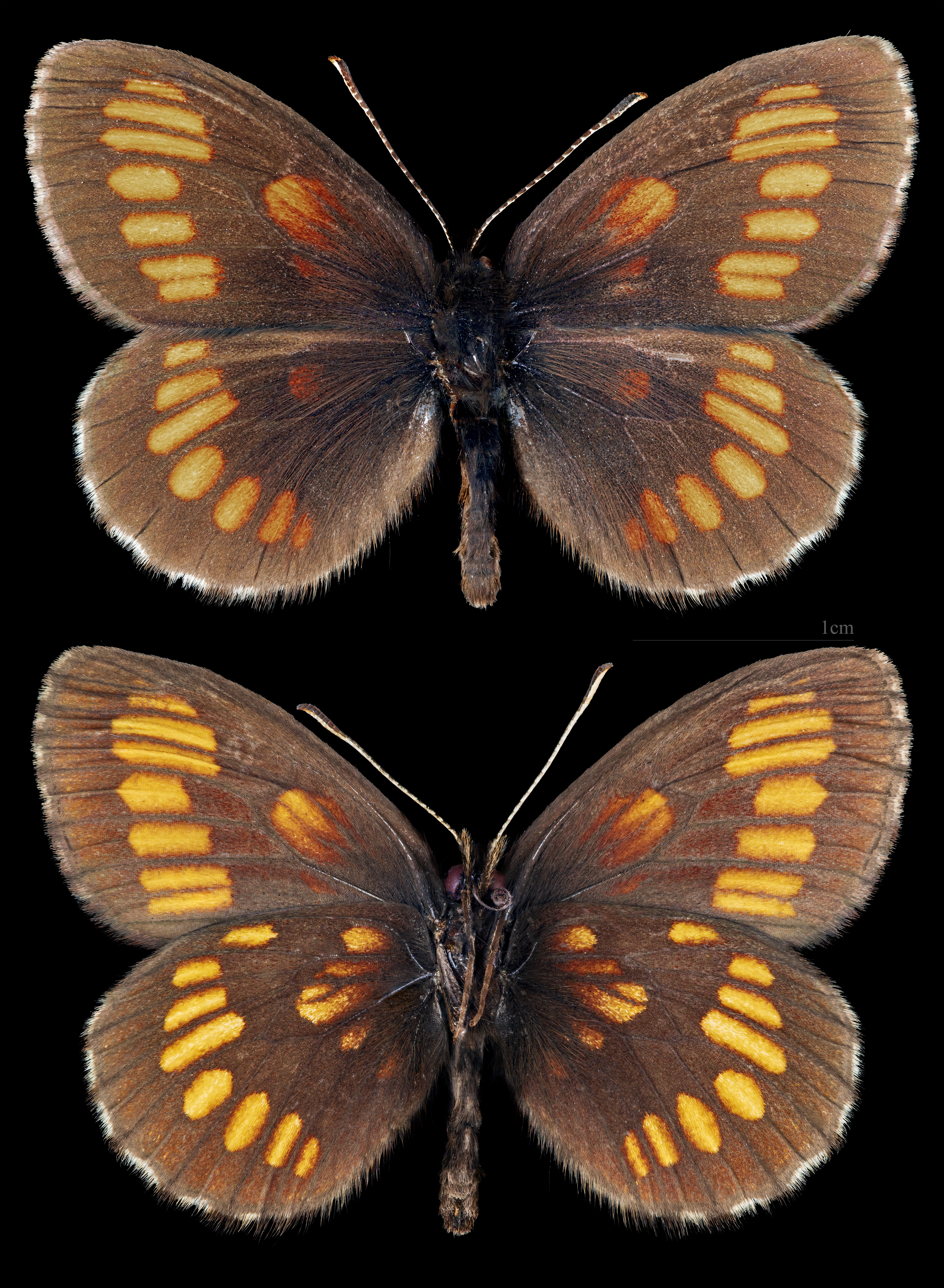
Erebia theano ♂

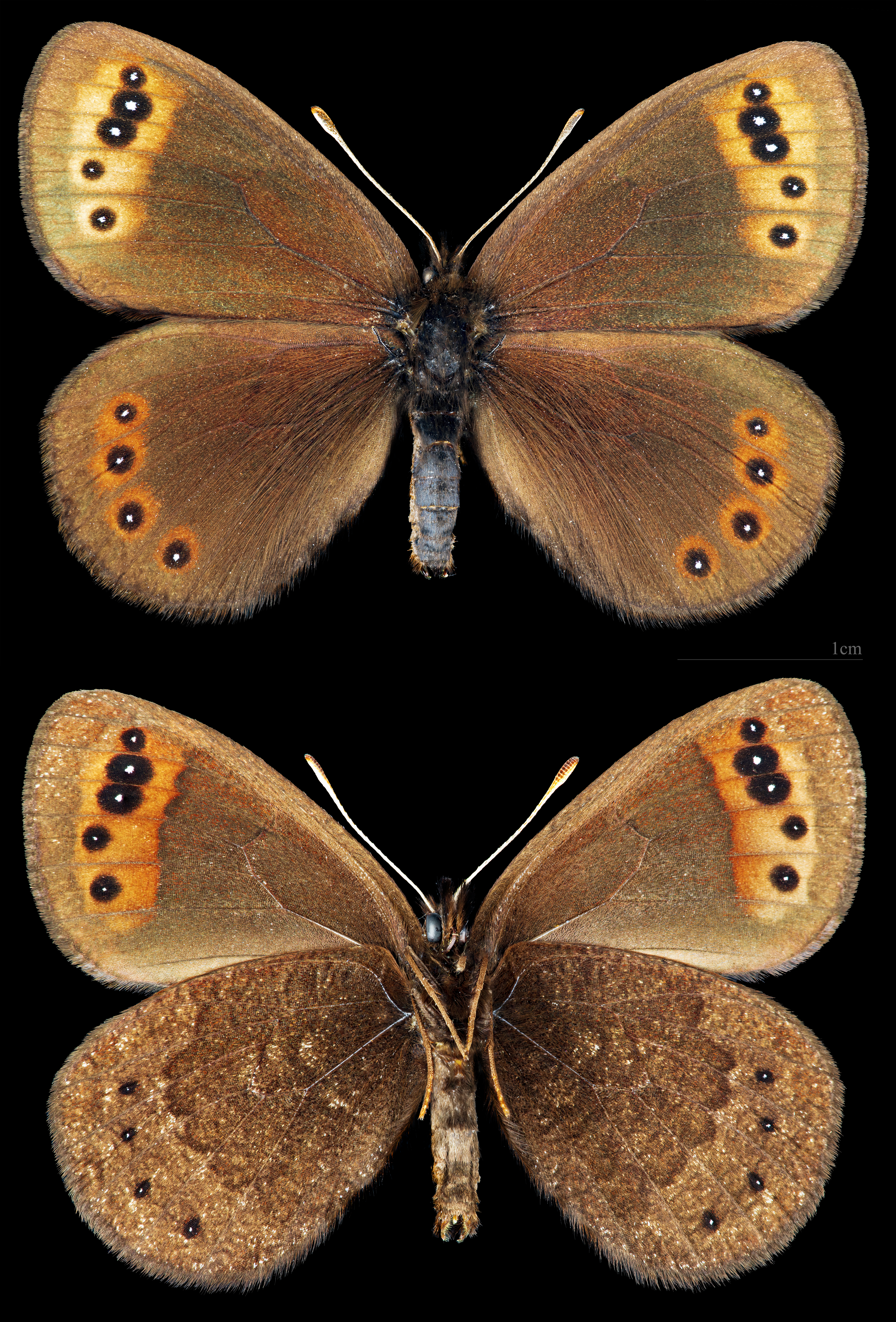
Erebia triarius ♂

== See also ==
- Other Lepidoptera genera with excessive named taxa:
  - Agrias
  - Parnassius
  - Prepona
  - Morpho
  - Euphaedra
- Species concept
