= List of butterflies of Metropolitan France =

This is a list of butterflies found in Metropolitan France (including Corsica).

== Hesperiidae ==
- Carcharodus alceae (Esper, 1780)
- Carcharodus baeticus (Rambur, 1839)
- Carcharodus floccifera (Zeller, 1847)
- Carcharodus lavatherae (Esper, 1783)
- Carterocephalus palaemon (Pallas, 1771)
- Erynnis tages (Linnaeus, 1758)
- Gegenes pumilio (Hoffmannsegg, 1804)
- Hesperia comma (Linnaeus, 1758)
- Heteropterus morpheus (Pallas, 1771)
- Muschampia proto (Ochsenheimer, 1808)
- Ochlodes sylvanus (Esper, 1777)
- Pyrgus alveus (Hübner, 1803)
- Pyrgus andromedae (Wallengren, 1853)
- Pyrgus armoricanus (Oberthur, 1910)
- Pyrgus bellieri (Oberthur, 1910)
- Pyrgus cacaliae (Rambur, 1839)
- Pyrgus carlinae (Rambur, 1839)
- Pyrgus carthami (Hübner, 1813)
- Pyrgus cirsii (Rambur, 1839)
- Pyrgus malvae (Linnaeus, 1758)
- Pyrgus malvoides (Elwes & Edwards, 1897)
- Pyrgus onopordi (Rambur, 1839)
- Pyrgus serratulae (Rambur, 1839)
- Pyrgus sidae (Esper, 1784)
- Pyrgus warrenensis (Verity, 1928)
- Spialia sertorius (Hoffmannsegg, 1804)
- Spialia therapne (Rambur, 1832)
- Thymelicus acteon (Rottemburg, 1775)
- Thymelicus lineola (Ochsenheimer, 1808)
- Thymelicus sylvestris (Poda, 1761)

== Lycaenidae ==
- Agriades glandon (de Prunner, 1798)
- Agriades optilete (Knoch, 1781)
- Agriades orbitulus (de Prunner, 1798)
- Agriades pyrenaicus (Boisduval, 1840)
- Aricia agestis (Denis & Schiffermuller, 1775)
- Aricia artaxerxes (Fabricius, 1793)
- Aricia morronensis (Ribbe, 1910)
- Aricia nicias (Meigen, 1830)
- Cacyreus marshalli Butler, 1898
- Callophrys avis Chapman, 1909
- Callophrys rubi (Linnaeus, 1758)
- Celastrina argiolus (Linnaeus, 1758)
- Cupido minimus (Fuessly, 1775)
- Cupido osiris (Meigen, 1829)
- Cupido alcetas (Hoffmannsegg, 1804)
- Cupido argiades (Pallas, 1771)
- Cyaniris semiargus (Rottemburg, 1775)
- Eumedonia eumedon (Esper, 1780)
- Favonius quercus (Linnaeus, 1758)
- Glaucopsyche alexis (Poda, 1761)
- Glaucopsyche melanops (Boisduval, 1828)
- Iolana iolas (Ochsenheimer, 1816)
- Laeosopis roboris (Esper, 1789)
- Lampides boeticus (Linnaeus, 1767)
- Leptotes pirithous (Linnaeus, 1767)
- Lycaena alciphron (Rottemburg, 1775)
- Lycaena dispar (Haworth, 1802)
- Lycaena helle (Denis & Schiffermuller, 1775)
- Lycaena hippothoe (Linnaeus, 1761)
- Lycaena phlaeas (Linnaeus, 1761)
- Lycaena tityrus (Poda, 1761)
- Lycaena virgaureae (Linnaeus, 1758)
- Lysandra bellargus (Rottemburg, 1775)
- Lysandra coridon (Poda, 1761)
- Lysandra hispana (Herrich-Schäffer, [1851])
- Phengaris alcon (Denis & Schiffermuller, 1775)
- Phengaris arion (Linnaeus, 1758)
- Phengaris nausithous (Bergstrasser, 1779)
- Phengaris rebeli (Hirschke, 1904)
- Phengaris teleius (Bergstrasser, 1779)
- Plebejus argus (Linnaeus, 1758)
- Plebejus argyrognomon (Bergstrasser, 1779)
- Plebejus bellieri (Oberthur, 1910)
- Plebejus idas (Linnaeus, 1761)
- Polyommatus damon (Denis & Schiffermuller, 1775)
- Polyommatus dolus (Hübner, 1823)
- Polyommatus ripartii (Freyer, 1830)
- Polyommatus daphnis (Denis & Schiffermuller, 1775)
- Polyommatus amandus (Schneider, 1792)
- Polyommatus dorylas (Denis & Schiffermuller, 1775)
- Polyommatus eros (Ochsenheimer, 1808)
- Polyommatus escheri (Hübner, 1823)
- Polyommatus icarus (Rottemburg, 1775)
- Polyommatus thersites (Cantener, 1835)
- Pseudophilotes baton (Bergstrasser, 1779)
- Satyrium acaciae (Fabricius, 1787)
- Satyrium esculi (Hübner, 1804)
- Satyrium ilicis (Esper, 1779)
- Satyrium pruni (Linnaeus, 1758)
- Satyrium spini (Denis & Schiffermuller, 1775)
- Satyrium w-album (Knoch, 1782)
- Scolitantides orion (Pallas, 1771)
- Thecla betulae (Linnaeus, 1758)
- Tomares ballus (Fabricius, 1787)

== Nymphalidae ==
- Aglais ichnusa (Bonelli, 1826)
- Aglais io (Linnaeus, 1758)
- Aglais urticae (Linnaeus, 1758)
- Apatura ilia (Denis & Schiffermuller, 1775)
- Apatura iris (Linnaeus, 1758)
- Aphantopus hyperantus (Linnaeus, 1758)
- Araschnia levana (Linnaeus, 1758)
- Arethusana arethusa (Denis & Schiffermuller, 1775)
- Argynnis paphia (Linnaeus, 1758)
- Argynnis pandora (Denis & Schiffermuller, 1775)
- Boloria aquilonaris (Stichel, 1908)
- Boloria graeca (Staudinger, 1870)
- Boloria napaea (Hoffmannsegg, 1804)
- Boloria pales (Denis & Schiffermuller, 1775)
- Boloria dia (Linnaeus, 1767)
- Boloria euphrosyne (Linnaeus, 1758)
- Boloria selene (Denis & Schiffermuller, 1775)
- Boloria titania (Esper, 1793)
- Boloria eunomia (Esper, 1799)
- Brenthis daphne (Bergstrasser, 1780)
- Brenthis hecate (Denis & Schiffermuller, 1775)
- Brenthis ino (Rottemburg, 1775)
- Brintesia circe (Fabricius, 1775)
- Charaxes jasius (Linnaeus, 1767)
- Chazara briseis (Linnaeus, 1764)
- Coenonympha arcania (Linnaeus, 1761)
- Coenonympha corinna (Hübner, 1804)
- Coenonympha dorus (Esper, 1782)
- Coenonympha gardetta (de Prunner, 1798)
- Coenonympha glycerion (Borkhausen, 1788)
- Coenonympha hero (Linnaeus, 1761)
- Coenonympha oedippus (Fabricius, 1787)
- Coenonympha pamphilus (Linnaeus, 1758)
- Coenonympha tullia (Muller, 1764)
- Danaus chrysippus (Linnaeus, 1758)
- Danaus plexippus (Linnaeus, 1758)
- Erebia aethiopellus (Hoffmannsegg, 1806)
- Erebia aethiops (Esper, 1777)
- Erebia alberganus (de Prunner, 1798)
- Erebia cassioides (Reiner & Hochenwarth, 1792)
- Erebia epiphron (Knoch, 1783)
- Erebia epistygne (Hübner, 1819)
- Erebia euryale (Esper, 1805)
- Erebia gorge (Hübner, 1804)
- Erebia gorgone Boisduval, 1833
- Erebia lefebvrei (Boisduval, 1828)
- Erebia ligea (Linnaeus, 1758)
- Erebia manto (Denis & Schiffermuller, 1775)
- Erebia medusa (Denis & Schiffermuller, 1775)
- Erebia melampus (Fuessly, 1775)
- Erebia meolans (Prunner, 1798)
- Erebia mnestra (Hübner, 1804)
- Erebia montanus (de Prunner, 1798)
- Erebia neoridas (Boisduval, 1828)
- Erebia oeme (Hübner, 1804)
- Erebia ottomana Herrich-Schäffer, 1847
- Erebia pandrose (Borkhausen, 1788)
- Erebia pharte (Hübner, 1804)
- Erebia pluto (de Prunner, 1798)
- Erebia pronoe (Esper, 1780)
- Erebia rondoui Oberthur, 1908
- Erebia scipio Boisduval, 1832
- Erebia sthennyo Graslin, 1850
- Erebia sudetica Staudinger, 1861
- Erebia triarius (de Prunner, 1798)
- Euphydryas aurinia (Rottemburg, 1775)
- Euphydryas cynthia (Denis & Schiffermuller, 1775)
- Euphydryas desfontainii (Godart, 1819)
- Euphydryas intermedia (Menetries, 1859)
- Euphydryas maturna (Linnaeus, 1758)
- Fabriciana adippe (Denis & Schiffermuller, 1775)
- Fabriciana elisa (Godart, [1824])
- Fabriciana niobe (Linnaeus, 1758)
- Hipparchia fagi (Scopoli, 1763)
- Hipparchia genava (Fruhstorfer, 1908)
- Hipparchia hermione (Linnaeus, 1764)
- Hipparchia neomiris (Godart, 1822)
- Hipparchia statilinus (Hufnagel, 1766)
- Hipparchia aristaeus (Bonelli, 1826)
- Hipparchia semele (Linnaeus, 1758)
- Hipparchia fidia (Linnaeus, 1767)
- Hyponephele lupinus (O. Costa, 1836)
- Hyponephele lycaon (Rottemburg, 1775)
- Issoria lathonia (Linnaeus, 1758)
- Lasiommata maera (Linnaeus, 1758)
- Lasiommata megera (Linnaeus, 1767)
- Lasiommata paramegaera (Hübner, 1824)
- Lasiommata petropolitana (Fabricius, 1787)
- Libythea celtis (Laicharting, 1782)
- Limenitis camilla (Linnaeus, 1764)
- Limenitis populi (Linnaeus, 1758)
- Limenitis reducta Staudinger, 1901
- Lopinga achine (Scopoli, 1763)
- Maniola jurtina (Linnaeus, 1758)
- Melanargia galathea (Linnaeus, 1758)
- Melanargia lachesis (Hübner, 1790)
- Melanargia occitanica (Esper, 1793)
- Melanargia russiae (Esper, 1783)
- Melitaea athalia (Rottemburg, 1775)
- Melitaea aurelia Nickerl, 1850
- Melitaea cinxia (Linnaeus, 1758)
- Melitaea deione (Geyer, 1832)
- Melitaea diamina (Lang, 1789)
- Melitaea didyma (Esper, 1778)
- Melitaea ignasiti Sagarra, 1926
- Melitaea parthenoides Keferstein, 1851
- Melitaea phoebe (Denis & Schiffermuller, 1775)
- Melitaea varia Meyer-Dur, 1851
- Minois dryas (Scopoli, 1763)
- Nymphalis antiopa (Linnaeus, 1758)
- Nymphalis polychloros (Linnaeus, 1758)
- Nymphalis xanthomelas (Esper, 1781)
- Oeneis glacialis (Moll, 1783)
- Pararge aegeria (Linnaeus, 1758)
- Polygonia c-album (Linnaeus, 1758)
- Polygonia egea (Cramer, 1775)
- Pyronia bathseba (Fabricius, 1793)
- Pyronia cecilia (Vallantin, 1894)
- Pyronia tithonus (Linnaeus, 1767)
- Satyrus actaea (Esper, 1781)
- Satyrus ferula (Fabricius, 1793)
- Speyeria aglaja (Linnaeus, 1758)
- Vanessa atalanta (Linnaeus, 1758)
- Vanessa cardui (Linnaeus, 1758)
- Vanessa virginiensis (Drury, 1773)

== Papilionidae ==
- Iphiclides feisthamelii (Duponchel, 1832)
- Iphiclides podalirius (Linnaeus, 1758)
- Papilio alexanor Esper, 1800
- Papilio hospiton Guenee, 1839
- Papilio machaon Linnaeus, 1758
- Parnassius apollo (Linnaeus, 1758)
- Parnassius mnemosyne (Linnaeus, 1758)
- Parnassius phoebus (Fabricius, 1793)
- Zerynthia polyxena (Denis & Schiffermuller, 1775)
- Zerynthia rumina (Linnaeus, 1758)

== Pieridae ==
- Anthocharis cardamines (Linnaeus, 1758)
- Anthocharis euphenoides Staudinger, 1869
- Aporia crataegi (Linnaeus, 1758)
- Colias alfacariensis Ribbe, 1905
- Colias croceus (Fourcroy, 1785)
- Colias hyale (Linnaeus, 1758)
- Colias palaeno (Linnaeus, 1761)
- Colias phicomone (Esper, 1780)
- Euchloe crameri Butler, 1869
- Euchloe insularis (Staudinger, 1861)
- Euchloe simplonia (Freyer, 1829)
- Euchloe tagis (Hübner, 1804)
- Gonepteryx cleopatra (Linnaeus, 1767)
- Gonepteryx rhamni (Linnaeus, 1758)
- Leptidea duponcheli (Staudinger, 1871)
- Leptidea juvernica Williams, 1946
- Leptidea reali Reissinger, 1990
- Leptidea sinapis (Linnaeus, 1758)
- Pieris brassicae (Linnaeus, 1758)
- Pieris bryoniae (Hübner, 1806)
- Pieris ergane (Geyer, 1828)
- Pieris mannii (Mayer, 1851)
- Pieris napi (Linnaeus, 1758)
- Pieris rapae (Linnaeus, 1758)
- Pontia callidice (Hübner, 1800)
- Pontia daplidice (Linnaeus, 1758)

== Riodinidae ==
- Hamearis lucina (Linnaeus, 1758)

== See also ==
- List of moths of Metropolitan France (A–C)
- List of moths of Metropolitan France (D–H)
- List of moths of Metropolitan France (I–O)
- List of moths of Metropolitan France (P–Z)
- Fauna of Metropolitan France
