= List of butterflies of the Iberian Peninsula =

This is a list of butterfly species recorded in Iberian Peninsula (Portugal and Spain) with the Spanish common name.

== Hesperiidae ==
Hesperiidae
Subfamily	Species	Spanish common name	Distribution	Picture
Heteropterinae	Carterocephalus palaemon	Fronteriza		
Heteropterinae	Heteropterus morpheus	Espejitos		
Hesperiinae	Borbo borbonica	Veloz fenestrada		
Hesperiinae	Gegenes nostrodamus	Veloz de las rieras		
Hesperiinae	Gegenes pumilio	Veloz menor		
Hesperiinae	Hesperia comma	Dorada manchas blancas		
Hesperiinae	Ochlodes sylvanus	Dorada orla ancha (=O. venatus)		
Hesperiinae	Thymelicus acteon	Dorada oscura		
Hesperiinae	Thymelicus lineola	Dorada línea corta		
Hesperiinae	Thymelicus sylvestris	Dorada línea larga		
Pyrginae	Carcharodus alceae	Piquitos castaña		
Pyrginae	Carcharodus baeticus	Piquitos		
Pyrginae	Carcharodus flocciferus	Piquitos serrana		
Pyrginae	Carcharodus lavatherae	Piquitos clara		
Pyrginae	Carcharodus tripolinus	Piquitos		
Pyrginae	Erynnis tages	Cervantes		
Pyrginae	Muschampia proto	Polvillo dorado		
Pyrginae	Pyrgus alveus	Ajedrezada serrana		
Pyrginae	Pyrgus andromedae	Ajedrezada admirada		
Pyrginae	Pyrgus armoricanus	Ajedrezada yunque		
Pyrginae	Pyrgus bellieri (=P. foulquieri)			
Pyrginae	Pyrgus cacaliae			
Pyrginae	Pyrgus carthami	Ajedrezada		
Pyrginae	Pyrgus cinarae	Ajedrezada Rusa		
Pyrginae	Pyrgus cirsii			
Pyrginae	Pyrgus malvoides	Ajedrezada menor		
Pyrginae	Pyrgus onopordi	Ajedrezada bigornia		
Pyrginae	Pyrgus serratulae	Ajedrezada verdosa		
Pyrginae	Pyrgus sidae	Ajedrezada de bandas amarillas		
Pyrginae	Spialia rosae			
Pyrginae	Spialia sertorius	Sertorio		

== Lycaenidae ==
Lycaenidae
Subfamily	Species	Spanish common name	Distribution	Picture
Polyommatinae
Polyommatinae	Agriades glandon	Poco brillo		
Polyommatinae	Agriades pyrenaicus	Niña gris		
Polyommatinae	Agriades zullichi			
Polyommatinae	Agrodiaetus damon	Azul cintada		
Polyommatinae	Agrodiaetus fabressei	Velludita parda española		
Polyommatinae	Agrodiaetus fulgens	Velludita fimbria clara menor		
Polyommatinae	Agrodiaetus ripartii	Velludita fimbria oscura		
Polyommatinae	Agrodiaetus violetae			
Polyommatinae	Aricia agestis	Morena serrana		
Polyommatinae	Aricia artaxerxes montensis			
Polyommatinae	Aricia cramera	Morena serrana		
Polyommatinae	Aricia morronensis	Morena española		
Polyommatinae	Aricia nicias	Borde amplio		
Polyommatinae	Azanus jesous			
Polyommatinae	Cacyreus marshalli	Taladro de los geranios		
Polyommatinae	Celastrina argiolus	Náyade		
Polyommatinae	Cupido carswelli	Duende marciano		
Polyommatinae	Cupido lorquinii	Duende azul		
Polyommatinae	Cupido minimus	Duende oscuro		
Polyommatinae	Cupido osiris	Duende mayor		
Polyommatinae	Cupido alcetas	Rabicorta		
Polyommatinae	Cupido argiades	Naranjitas rabicorta		
Polyommatinae	Cyaniris semiargus	Falsa limbada		
Polyommatinae	Eumedonia eumedon	Raya corta		
Polyommatinae	Glaucopsyche alexis	Manchas verdes		
Polyommatinae	Glaucopsyche melanops	Escamas azules		
Polyommatinae	Iolana iolas	Espantalobos		
Polyommatinae	Kretania hesperica	Niña del astrágalo		
Polyommatinae	Lampides boeticus	Canela estriada		
Polyommatinae	Leptotes pirithous	Gris estriada		
Polyommatinae	Lysandra albicans	Niña andaluza		
Polyommatinae	Lysandra bellargus	Niña celeste		
Polyommatinae	Lysandra caelestissima	Niña celeste		
Polyommatinae	Lysandra coridon	Niña corindón		
Polyommatinae	Lysandra hispana	Niña catalana		
Polyommatinae	Phengaris alcon	Hormiguera		
Polyommatinae	Phengaris arion	Hormiguera de lunares		
Polyommatinae	Phengaris nausithous	Hormiguera oscura		
Polyommatinae	Plebejus argus	Niña		
Polyommatinae	Plebejus idas	Niña esmaltada		
Polyommatinae	Polyommatus amanda	Niña estriada		
Polyommatinae	Polyommatus celina			
Polyommatinae	Polyommatus daphnis	Azul bipuntada		
Polyommatinae	Polyommatus dorylas	Niña Turquesa		
Polyommatinae	Polyommatus eros	Eros		
Polyommatinae	Polyommatus escheri	Fabiola		
Polyommatinae	Polyommatus golgus	Niña de Sierra Nevada		
Polyommatinae	Polyommatus icarus	Dos puntos		
Polyommatinae	Polyommatus nivescens	Niña de nácar		
Polyommatinae	Polyommatus sagratrox	Niña de la Sagra		
Polyommatinae	Polyommatus thersites	Celda limpia		
Polyommatinae	Pseudophilotes abencerragus	Abencerraje		
Polyommatinae	Pseudophilotes baton	Falso abencerraje		
Polyommatinae	Pseudophilotes panoptes			
Polyommatinae	Scolitantides orion	Banda anaranjada		
Polyommatinae	Tarucus theophrastus	Laberinto		
Polyommatinae	Zizeeria knysna	Violetilla		
Lycaeninae
Lycaeninae	Lycaena alciphron	Manto de púrpura		
Lycaeninae	Lycaena helle			
Lycaeninae	Lycaena hippothoe	Manto de cobre		
Lycaeninae	Lycaena phlaeas	Manto bicolor		
Lycaeninae	Lycaena tityrus	Manto oscuro		
Lycaeninae	Lycaena virgaureae	Manto de oro		
Lycaeninae	Callophrys avis	Cejirrubia		
Lycaeninae	Callophrys rubi	Cejialba		
Lycaeninae	Laeosopsis roboris	Moradilla del fresno		
Lycaeninae	Neozephirus quercus	Nazarena		
Lycaeninae	Satyrium acaciae	Sin perfume		
Lycaeninae	Satyrium esculi	Qüerquera		
Lycaeninae	Satyrium ilicis	Qüerquera serrana		
Lycaeninae	Satyrium pruni	Qüerquera serrana		
Lycaeninae	Satyrium spini	Mancha azul		
Lycaeninae	Satyrium w-album	W-blanca		
Lycaeninae	Thecla betulae	Topacio		
Lycaeninae	Tomares ballus	Cardenillo		

== Nymphalidae ==
Nymphalidae
Subfamily	Species	Spanish common name	Distribution	Picture
Apaturinae	Apatura ilia	Tornasolada chica		
Apaturinae	Apatura iris	Tornasolada		
Charaxinae	Charaxes jasius	Cuatro colas / bajá		
Danainae	Danaus chrysippus	Mariposa tigre		
Danainae	Danaus plexippus	Monarca		
Heliconiinae	Argynnis pandora	Pandora		
Heliconiinae	Argynnis paphia	Nacarada		
Heliconiinae	Boloria dia	Perlada violeta		
Heliconiinae	Boloria eunomia	Perlada de los pantanos		
Heliconiinae	Boloria euphrosyne	Perlada rojiza		
Heliconiinae	Boloria napaea	Perlada de montaña		
Heliconiinae	Boloria pales	Perlada alpina		
Heliconiinae	Boloria selene	Perlada castaña		
Heliconiinae	Brenthis daphne	Laurel		
Heliconiinae	Brenthis hecate	Hechicera		
Heliconiinae	Brenthis ino	Laurel menor		
Heliconiinae	Fabriciana adippe	Adipe		
Heliconiinae	Fabriciana niobe	Niobe		
Heliconiinae	Issoria lathonia	Sofía		
Heliconiinae	Speyeria aglaja	Lunares de plata		
Libytheinae	Libythea celtis	Repicoteada		
Limenitidinae	Limenitis camilla	Ninfa de bosque		
Limenitidinae	Limenitis reducta	Ninfa de los arroyos		
Nymphalinae	Aglais io	Pavo real		
Nymphalinae	Aglais urticae	Ortiguera		
Nymphalinae	Araschnia levana	Protea		
Nymphalinae	Euphydryas aurinia	Ondas rojas		
Nymphalinae	Euphydryas desfontainii	Dientes gualdos		
Nymphalinae	Melitaea celadussa =M. athalia celadussa	Atalia		
Nymphalinae	Melitaea deione	Deione		
Nymphalinae	Melitaea parthenoides	Minerva		
Nymphalinae	Melitaea aetherie	Doncella gaditana		
Nymphalinae	Melitaea cinxia	Doncella punteada		
Nymphalinae	Melitaea diamina	Doncella oscura		
Nymphalinae	Melitaea didyma	Doncella tímida		
Nymphalinae	Melitaea phoebe	Doncella mayor		
Nymphalinae	Melitaea trivia	Doncella modesta		
Nymphalinae	Nymphalis antiopa	Antíopa		
Nymphalinae	Nymphalis polychloros	Antíopa		
Nymphalinae	Polygonia c-album	C-blanca		
Nymphalinae	Vanessa atalanta	Numerada		
Nymphalinae	Vanessa cardui	Cardera		
Nymphalinae	Vanessa virginiensis	Cardera		
Satyrinae	Aphantopus hyperantus	Sortijitas		
Satyrinae	Arethusana arethusa	Pintas ocres		
Satyrinae	Chazara briseis	Banda oblicua		
Satyrinae	Chazara prieuri	Bereber		
Satyrinae	Coenonympha dorus	Velada de negro		
Satyrinae	Coenonympha glycerion	Castaño morena		
Satyrinae	Coenonympha pamphilus	Níspola		
Satyrinae	Erebia cassioides			
Satyrinae	Erebia epiphron			
Satyrinae	Erebia epistygne			
Satyrinae	Erebia euryale			
Satyrinae	Erebia gorge			
Satyrinae	Erebia gorgone			
Satyrinae	Erebia hispania			
Satyrinae	Erebia lefebvrei			
Satyrinae	Erebia manto			
Satyrinae	Erebia meolans			
Satyrinae	Erebia neoridas			
Satyrinae	Erebia oeme			
Satyrinae	Erebia palarica			
Satyrinae	Erebia pandrose			
Satyrinae	Erebia pronoe			
Satyrinae	Erebia rondoui			
Satyrinae	Erebia sthennyo	Erebia de Graslin		
Satyrinae	Erebia triaria			
Satyrinae	Erebia zapateri			
Satyrinae	Hipparchia hermione ( = Hipparchia alcyone)	Banda acodada		
Satyrinae	Hipparchia fagi	Banda curva		
Satyrinae	Hipparchia fidia	Festón blanco		
Satyrinae	Hipparchia semele	Pardo-rubia		
Satyrinae	Hipparchia statilinus	Sátiro moreno		
Satyrinae	Hyponephele lupina	Lobito anillado		
Satyrinae	Hyponephele lycaon	Lobito		
Satyrinae	Brintesia circe	Rey moro		
Satyrinae	Lasiommata maera	Pedregosa		
Satyrinae	Lasiommata megera	Saltacercas		
Satyrinae	Lasiommata petropolitana	Pedregosa menor		
Satyrinae	Lopinga achine	Bacante		
Satyrinae	Maniola jurtina	La loba		
Satyrinae	Melanargia galathea	Medioluto norteña		
Satyrinae	Melanargia ines	Medioluto Inés		
Satyrinae	Melanargia lachesis	Medioluto ibérica		
Satyrinae	Melanargia occitanica	Medioluto herrumbrosa		
Satyrinae	Melanargia russiae	Medioluto montañera		
Satyrinae	Minois dryas	Ocelos azules		
Satyrinae	Pararge aegeria	Maculada		
Satyrinae	Pseudochazara williamsi	Cuatro ocelos de Sierra Nevada		
Satyrinae	Pyronia bathseba	Lobito listado		
Satyrinae	Pyronia cecilia	Lobito jaspeado		
Satyrinae	Pyronia tithonus	Lobito agreste		
Satyrinae	Satyrus actaea	Negra		
Satyrinae	Satyrus ferula	Negra mayor		

== Papilionidae ==
Papilionidae
Subfamily	Species	Spanish common name	Distribution	Picture
Papilioninae	Iphiclides feisthamelii	Podalirio ibérica		
Papilioninae	Papilio machaon	Macaón		
Parnassiinae	Zerynthia rumina	Arlequín		
Parnassiinae	Parnassius apollo	Apolo		
Parnassiinae	Parnassius mnemosyne	Blanca de Asso		

== Pieridae ==
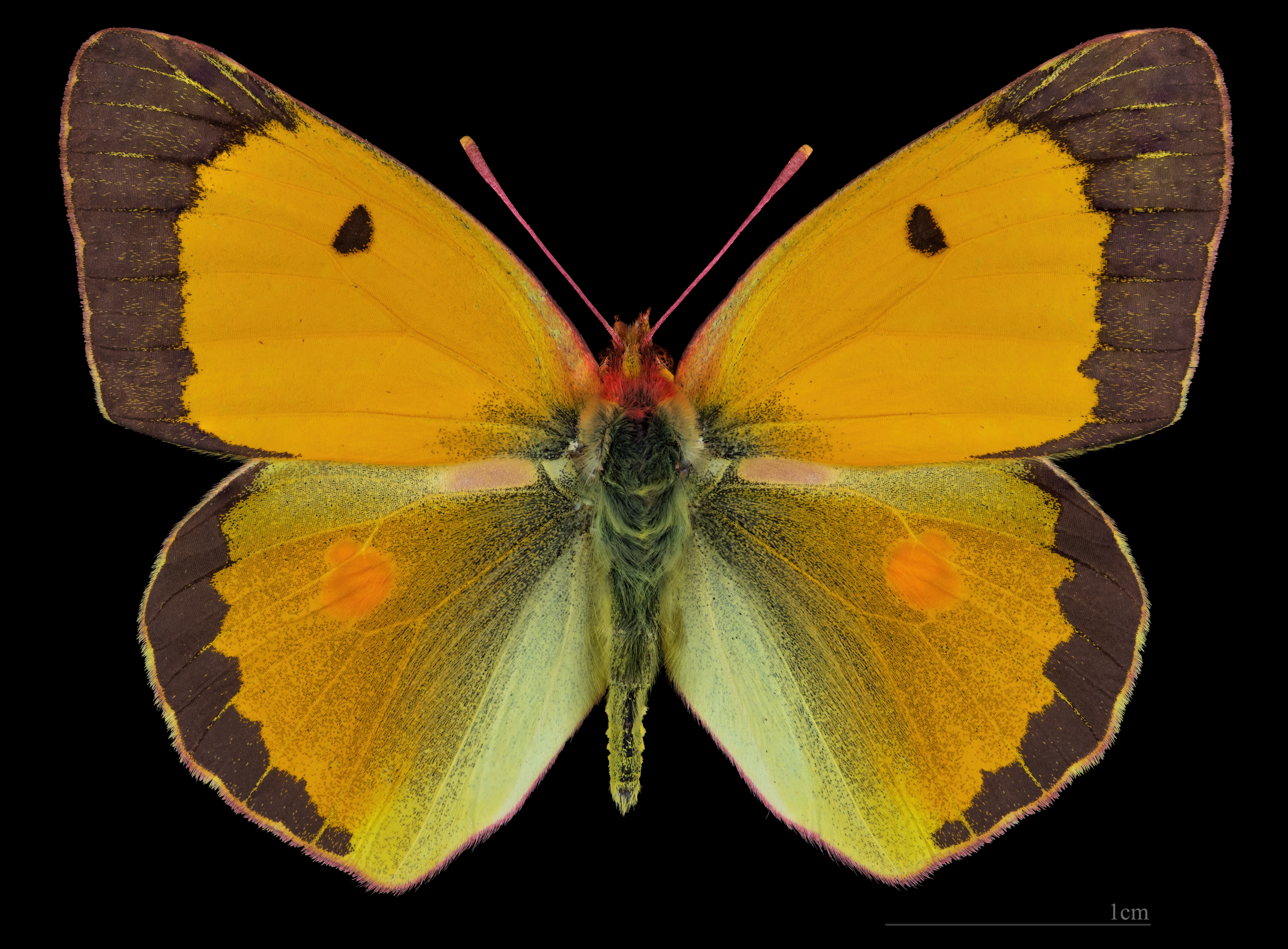
Colias crocea

Subfamily Coliadinae

- Colias alfacariensis – colias de Berger
- Colias crocea – amarilla
- Colias phicomone – verdosa
- Gonepteryx cleopatra – Cleopatra
- Gonepteryx rhamni – limonera

Subfamily Dismorphiinae

- Leptidea sinapis – blanca esbelta
- Leptidea reali – blanca esbelta

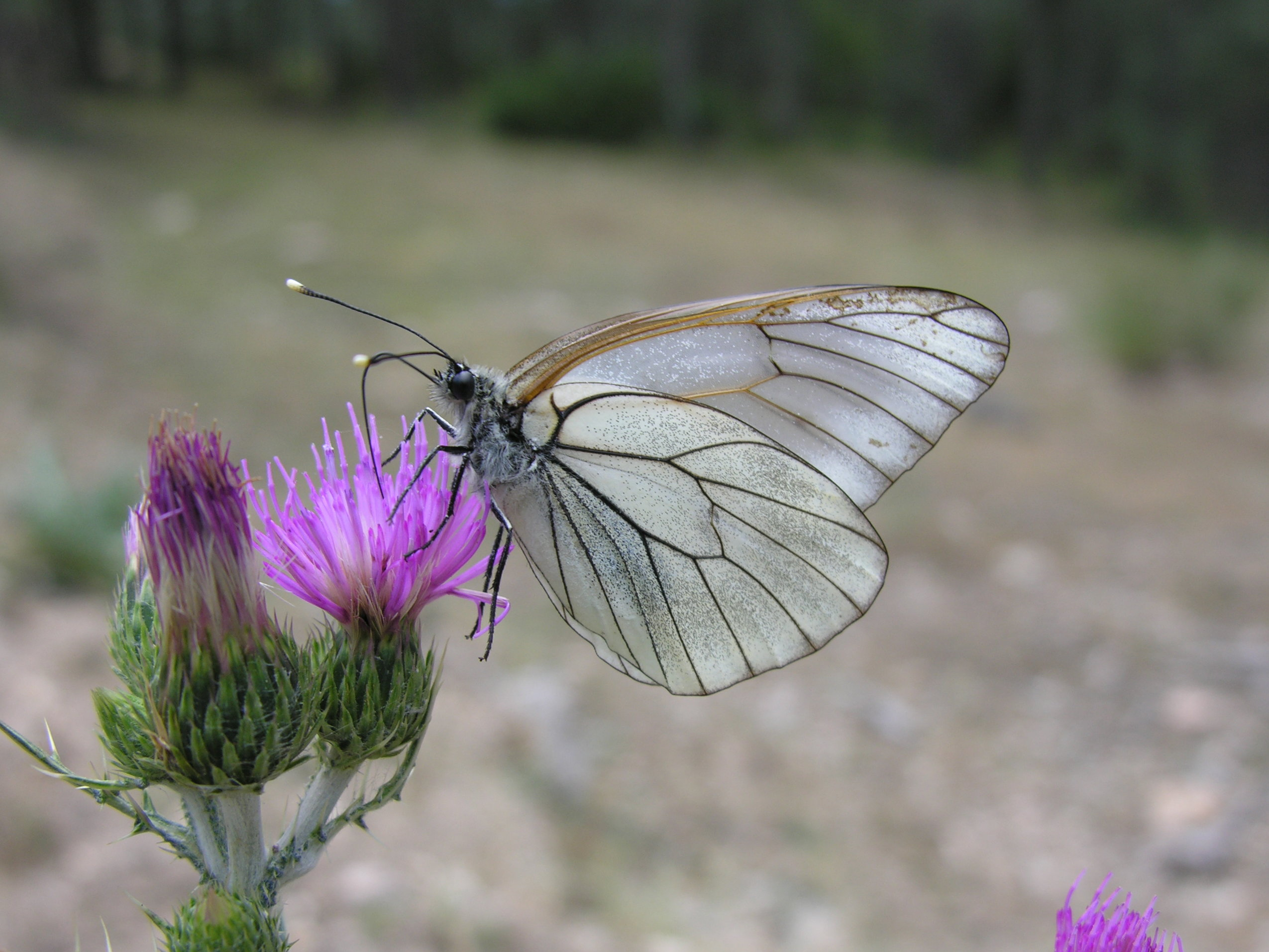
Blanca del majuelo

Subfamily Pierinae

- Anthocharis belia – bandera española
- Anthocharis cardamines – musgosa
- Aporia crataegi – blanca del majuelo
- Artogeia ergane – blanca escasa
- Colotis evagore – colotis del desierto
- Euchloe bazae – puntaparda verdosa
- Euchloe belemia – blanca verdirrayada
- Euchloe crameri – blanquiverdosa moteada
- Euchloe simplonia
- Euchloe tagis – blanquiverdosa curva
- Pieris brassicae – mariposa de la col
- Pieris mannii – blanca catalana
- Pieris napi – blanca verdinerviada

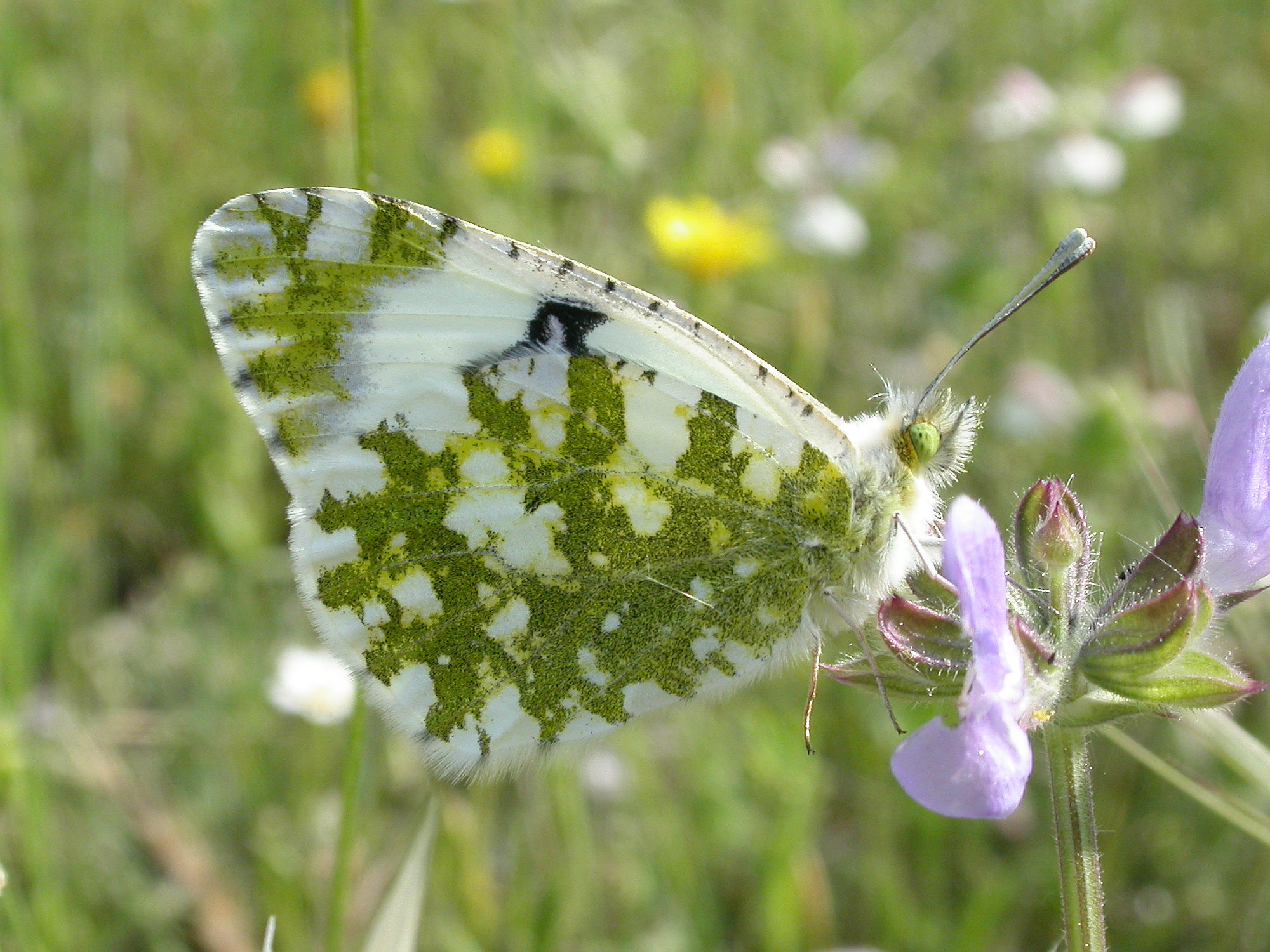
Blanquiverdosa moteada

- Pieris rapae – Blanquita de la col
- Pontia daplidice – blanquiverdosa
- Pontia callidice – blanquiverdosa alpina
- Zegris eupheme – el zegrí

== Riodinidae ==
Riodinidae
Subfamily	Species	Spanish common name	Distribution	Picture
	Hamearis lucina	Perico		Perico
