= List of moths of the Iberian Peninsula =

Iberian Peninsula

Iberian moths represent about 4,454 species. The moths (mostly nocturnal) and butterflies (mostly diurnal) together make up the taxonomic order Lepidoptera.

This is a list of moth species which have been recorded in Portugal, Spain Andorra, Gibraltar and parts of southern France (together forming the Iberian Peninsula). This list also includes species found on the Balearic Islands.

== See also ==
- List of butterflies of the Iberian Peninsula
