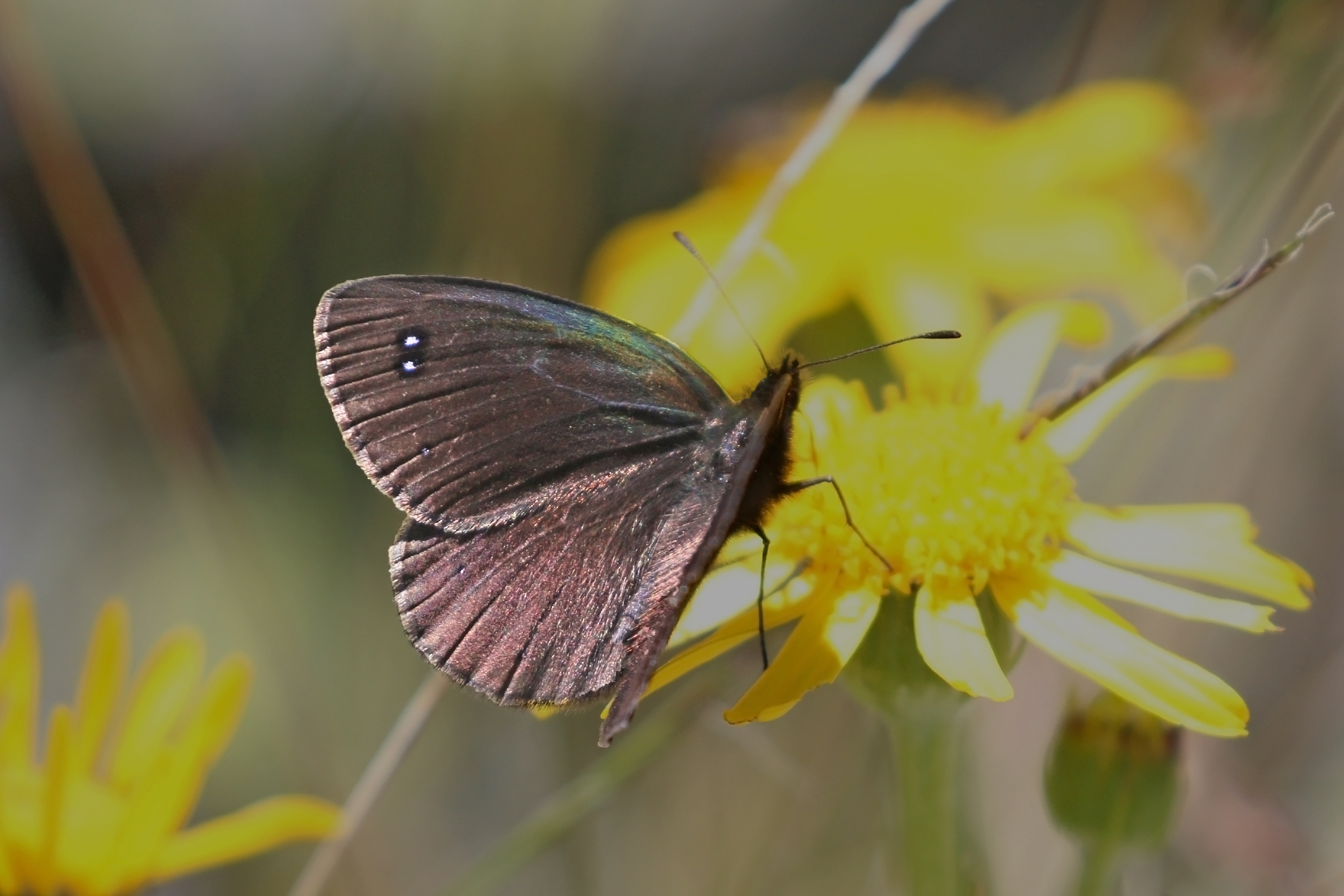
- male in Bulgaria

Scientific classification
- Kingdom: Animalia
- Phylum: Arthropoda
- Class: Insecta
- Order: Lepidoptera
- Family: Nymphalidae
- Genus: Erebia
- Species: E. melas

Binomial name
- Erebia melas (Herbst, 1796)

= Black ringlet =

Species of butterfly

The black ringlet (Erebia melas) is a member of the subfamily Satyrinae of the family Nymphalidae. It is a high-altitude butterfly found in Albania, former Yugoslavia, Bulgaria, Greece, and Romania.

== Description in Seitz ==
E. melas Hbst. (=maurus Esp.) (37 a). In shape and size like stygne, bearing a close resemblance to the alpine form of the same; the ground-colour however is much darker, being nearly black. On the forewing there are towards the apex two white-centred black ocelli, which contrast with the ground-colour and are sometimes confluent; a third smaller ocellus is situated towards the hindmargin. The hindwing has distally 3—4 white-centred ocelli, which are sometimes as large as those on the forewing. The russet band is indicated by a pale sheen only in the female. The underside of the male agrees fairly well with the upper, the hindwing being somewhat darker than the forewing and bearing sometimes traces of a distally slightly dentate middle band. In the female the underside is variable, the brown band of the forewing is sometimes distinctly developed or is indicated by a lighter tint, being sometimes altogether absent. The hindwing is brown-grey with blackish atoms; there being before the distal margin a lighter band which is exteriorly undulate and bears 3—4 small white-centred ocelli. In Carinthia, Istria, the Balkan countries, South Russia and Greece. — In the form astur Oberth. (37 a) [may be subspecies of lefebvrei] the upperside is quite black, sometimes without ocelli, but mostly with 2 small, white, usually deep black-bordered ocelli. The female silvery grey beneath, with darker forewing. Before the distal margin there is a band which is dark red-brown on the forewing and pale grey on the hindwing, thus contrasting with the ground. From the higher parts of the Pyrenees. — lefebvrei Dub. (37a) [full species in Funet] has the forewing more elongate than the name-typical melas; the ocelli of both wings are larger and more brightly white-centred, the two on the forewing being mostly united. On the underside the forewing is but little paler than above, the russet-red band being distinct. The hindwing is uniformly black-brown without band, the submarginal ocelli being very small or quite absent. Antenna black above and beneath, being white beneath in melas. Pyrenees. — pyrenaea Oberth. [may be subspecies of lefebvrei] has in the male often a red-brown band on the forewing beneath; the female has the forewing dark red-brown, the underside with bright red distal band, the hindwing beneath being brown-red with pale yellowish distal band. On the rocky slopes of the Canigou, from 2400 m to the summit. — An intermediate form, intermedia, was described by Oberthur from the mountains of Cambres d'Ase, south of the Mt. Louis (Pyrenees). — Egg light ochreous, with 30-32 longitudinal ribs and irregular impressions. Larva yellow or reddish grey, with yellow sides, dotted with brown on the back, there being a broad dark dorsal line. Pupa first green, the abdomen marked with red, later the wing-cases milky white. The butterflies are on the wing in July, hurrying in a fast flight over the precipices and the boulders, flying at but a little distance above the ground (Oberthur), plentiful.

Adults are on wing from July to September.

The larvae feed on Festuca ovina and possibly other grasses. It overwinters in the larval stage.
