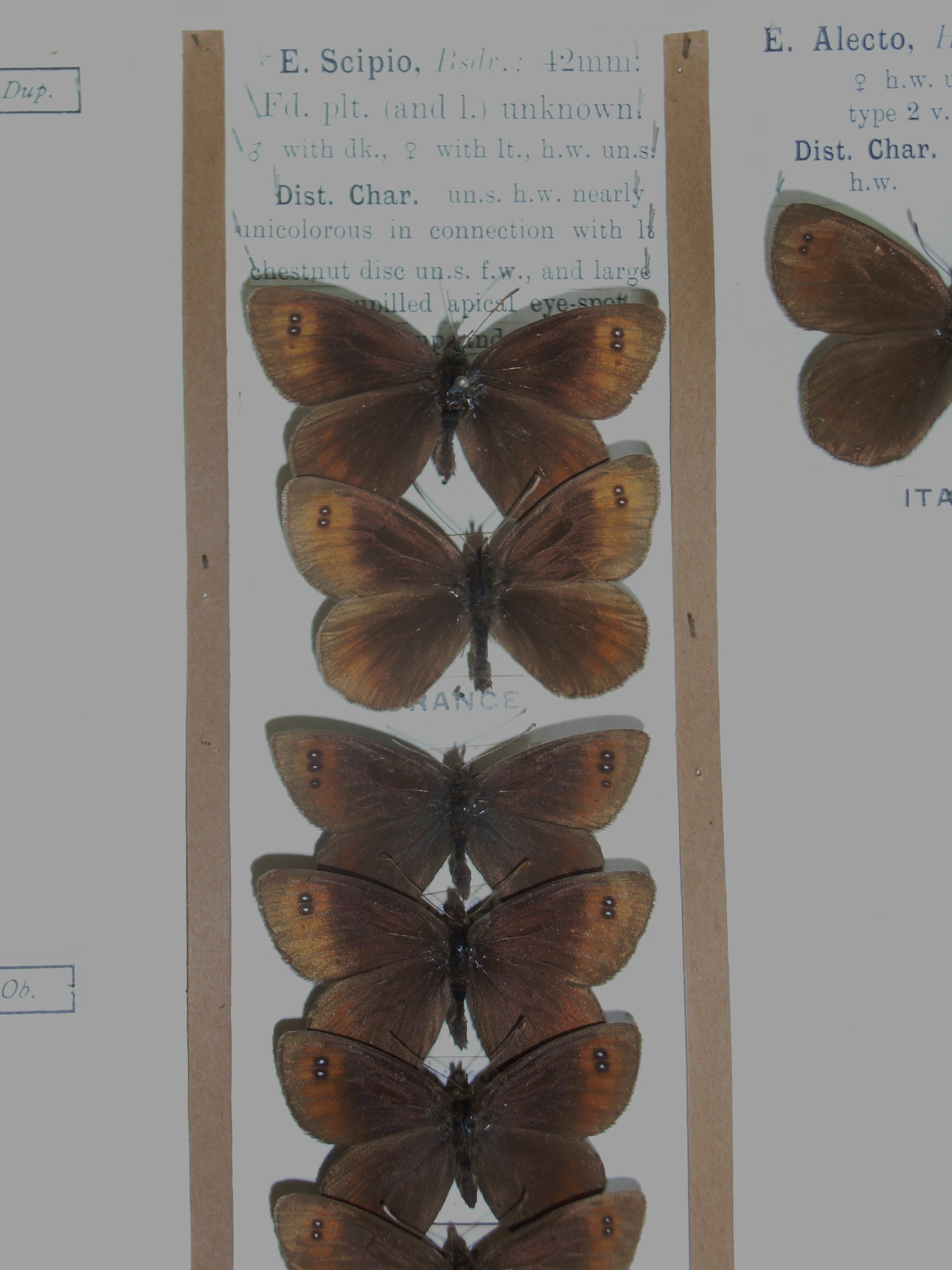
- Langham and Wheeler collection - Ulster Museum

Scientific classification
- Kingdom: Animalia
- Phylum: Arthropoda
- Class: Insecta
- Order: Lepidoptera
- Family: Nymphalidae
- Genus: Erebia
- Species: E. scipio

Binomial name
- Erebia scipio (Boisduval, 1832)

= Larche ringlet =

Species of butterfly

The Larche ringlet (Erebia scipio) is a member of the subfamily Satyrinae of the family Nymphalidae. It is a high-mountain butterfly found in the Alps of France and Italy.

== Description in Seitz ==
E. scipio Bsd. (37b). Rather large, the wings narrow and elongate, the distal margin but little curved. The russet-red band of the forewing is interrupted by the veins, being costally rather broad and narrowing posteriorly. There are anteriorly 2 equal-sized white-centred ocelli standing close together and being followed by 2 additional small black ocelli which have likewise white pupils. On the underside these last two are frequently absent or are represented by simple black dots. The band of the hindwing consists of 3 -4 elongate russet-red spots, which have but rarely small ocelli. On the underside the forewing is russet-red in the male, and russet -yellow in the female, the costal and distal margins being grey- brown in the male and white-grey in the female. The ocelli as above. The hindwing beneath is dark brown in the male, sometimes somewhat paler towards the outer margin, being uniformly white-grey without any markings in the female. In the Basses Alpes, for instance at Digne in South France.
