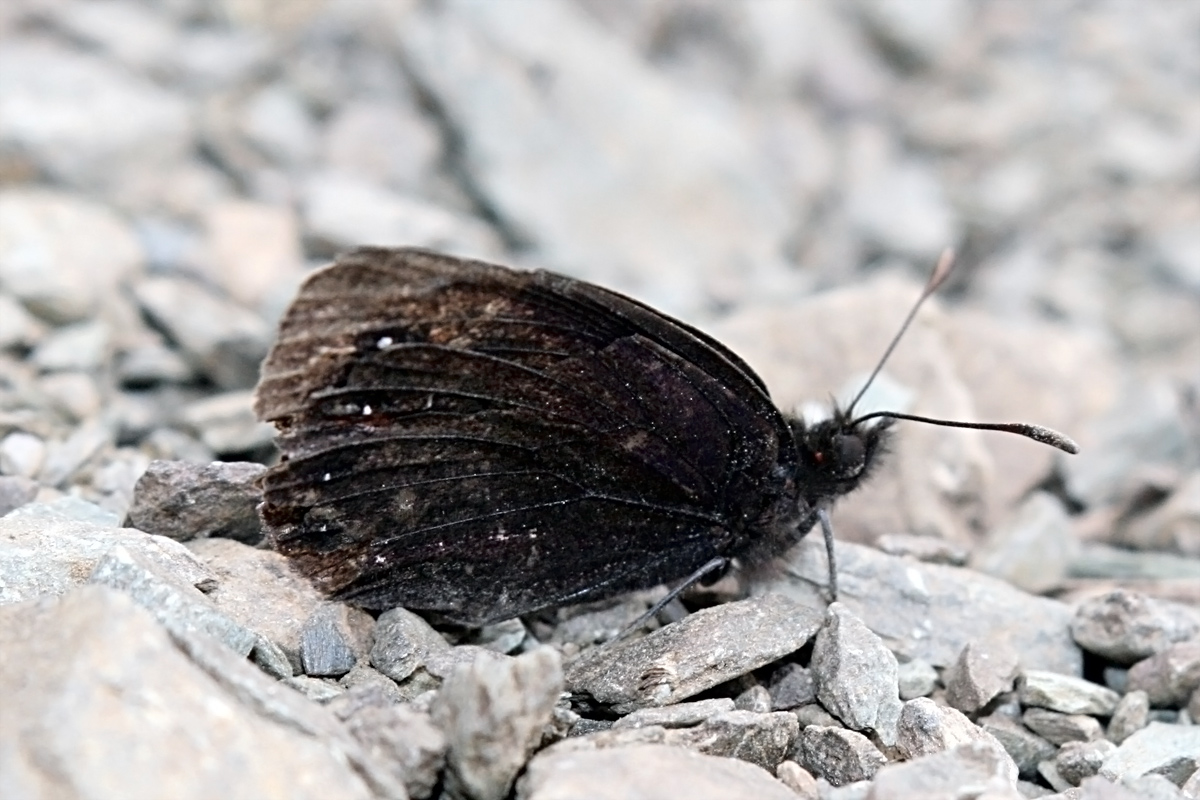

Scientific classification
- Domain: Eukaryota
- Kingdom: Animalia
- Phylum: Arthropoda
- Class: Insecta
- Order: Lepidoptera
- Family: Nymphalidae
- Genus: Erebia
- Species: E. lefebvrei

Binomial name
- Erebia lefebvrei (Boisduval, 1828)

= Erebia lefebvrei =

Lefèbvre's ringlet

Species of butterfly

Erebia lefebvrei, or Lefèbvre's ringlet, is a member of the subfamily Satyridae of the family Nymphalidae. This brown is found in France. It has been considered a subspecies of Erebia melas.

== Description ==
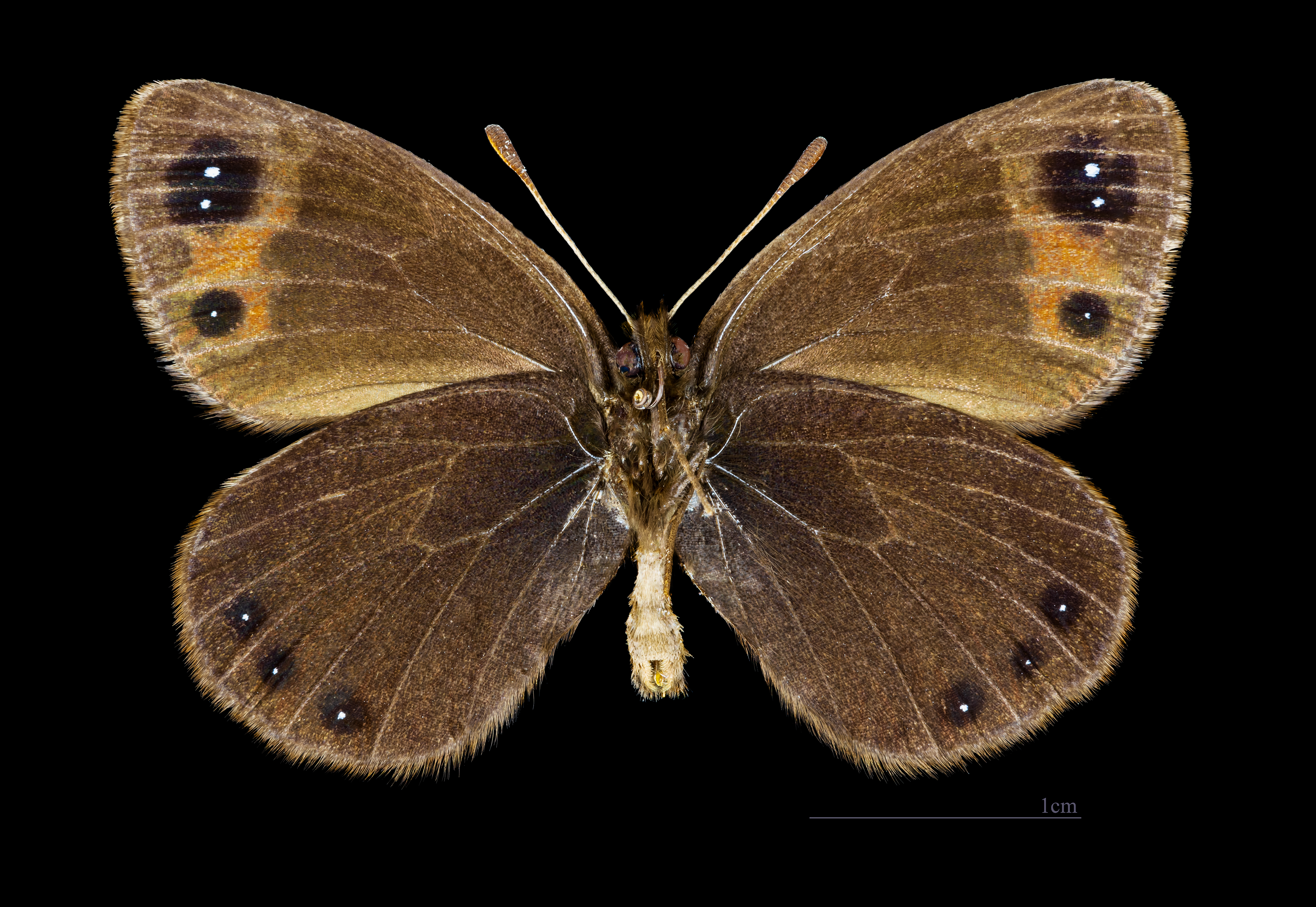
Erebia lefebvrei

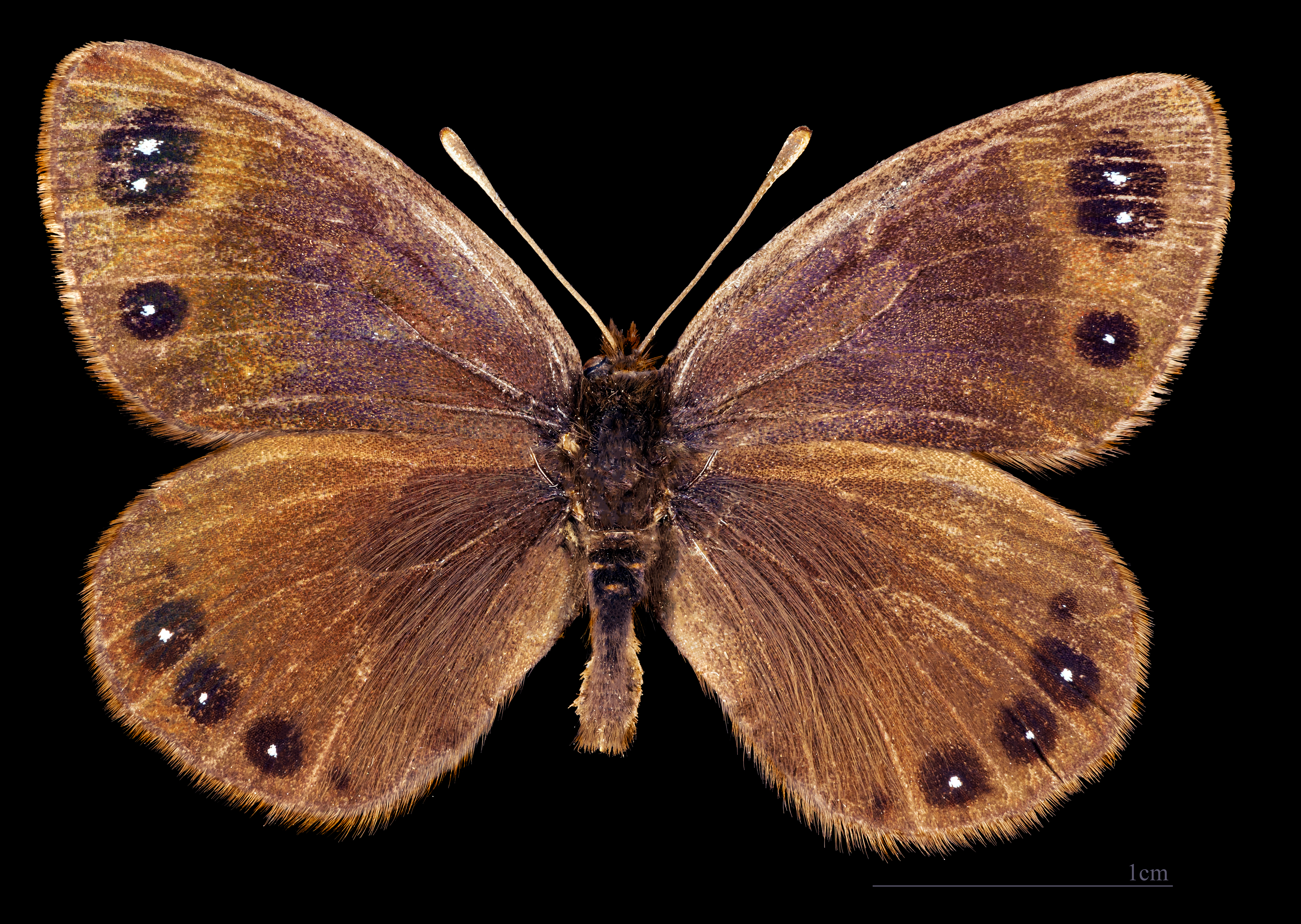
Erebia lefebvrei △
