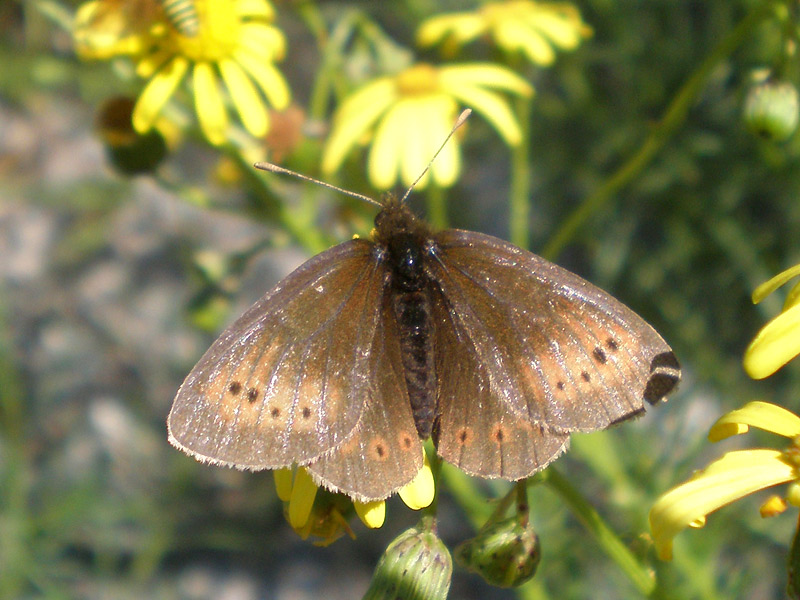
- Canillo, Andorra

Conservation status
- Least Concern (IUCN 3.1)

Scientific classification
- Kingdom: Animalia
- Phylum: Arthropoda
- Class: Insecta
- Order: Lepidoptera
- Family: Nymphalidae
- Genus: Erebia
- Species: E. epiphron

Binomial name
- Erebia epiphron (Knoch, 1783)

= Small mountain ringlet =

Species of butterfly

The small mountain ringlet or mountain ringlet (Erebia epiphron) is a butterfly of the family Nymphalidae. It is found in mountainous regions of southern and central Europe.

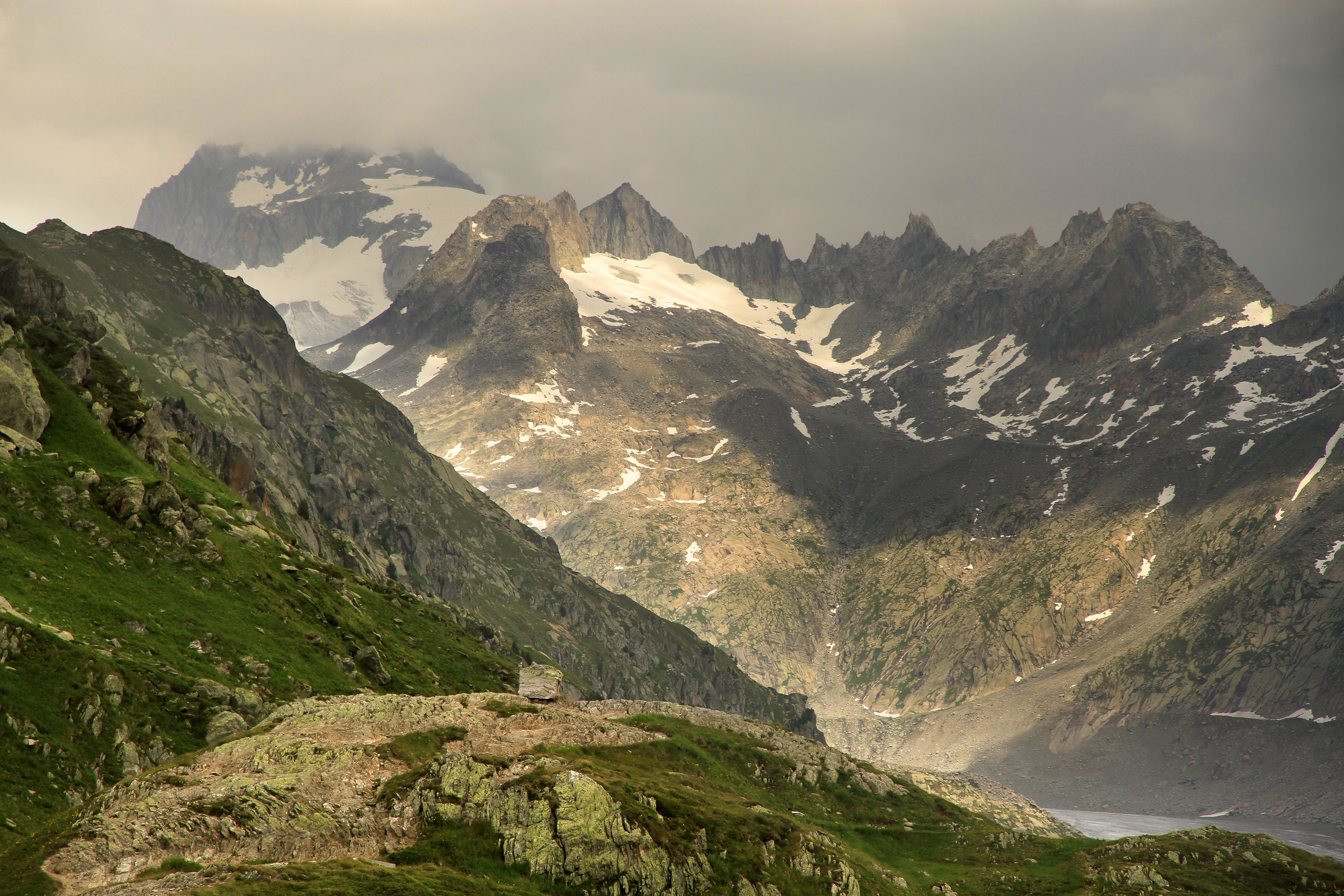
Habitat in the Uri Alps

== Distribution ==
Mountain areas of Albania, Andorra, Austria, Great Britain, Czech Republic, France, Germany, Greece, Italy, Liechtenstein, North Macedonia, Poland, Romania, Slovakia, Spain, Switzerland, Yugoslavia (Serbia, Kosovo, Voivodina, Montenegro, Bosnia and Herzegovina, Croatia).

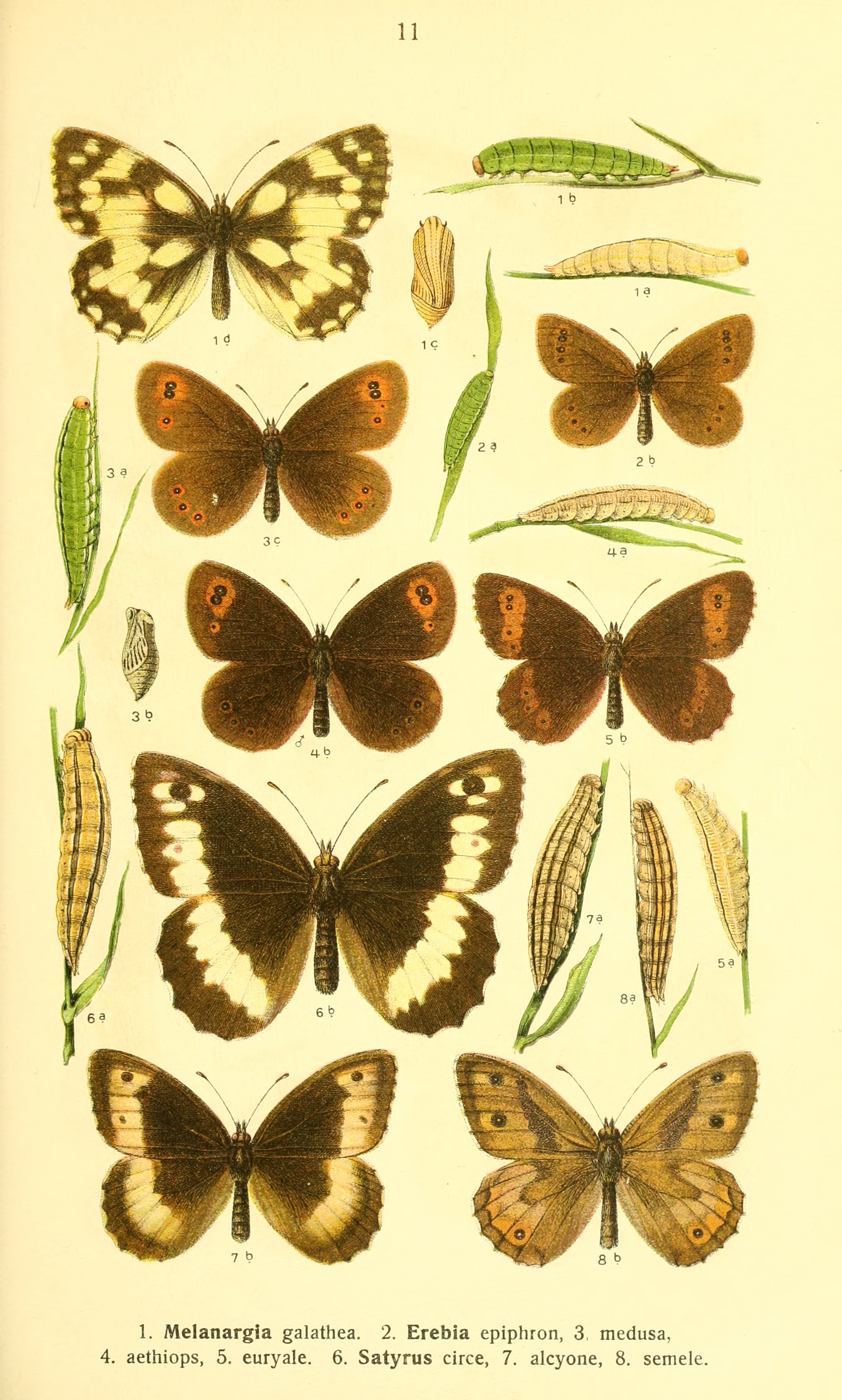
Figures 2 and 2a

=== Great Britain ===
It is Britain's only true alpine species of butterfly. The larva feeds on moor matgrass near bogs and springs and the nectar-feeding adult visits bilberry, tormentil and heath bedstraw.

== Life history ==
The pale cream eggs are laid singly, each female laying up to 70. The egg stage lasts two or three weeks.

The larva is green with a double dorsal and a single lateral white or yellowish line. The third instar larvae hibernate in grass tussocks. They emerge in the spring and recommence feeding. Some larvae spend two years in this stage, the result of a late spring and short summer restricting growth. Recorded larval food plants are Aira praecox (Czechoslovakia, Spain), Deschampsia cespitosa (Czechoslovakia), Festuca ovina (Spain), Nardus stricta (British Isles) and Poa annua (Spain)

The pupa is formed deep in grass tussocks, encased within a loose silk structure. The pupa stage lasts about three weeks.

The flight period is extremely short, a few weeks only, June to August depending on altitude.

== Description ==
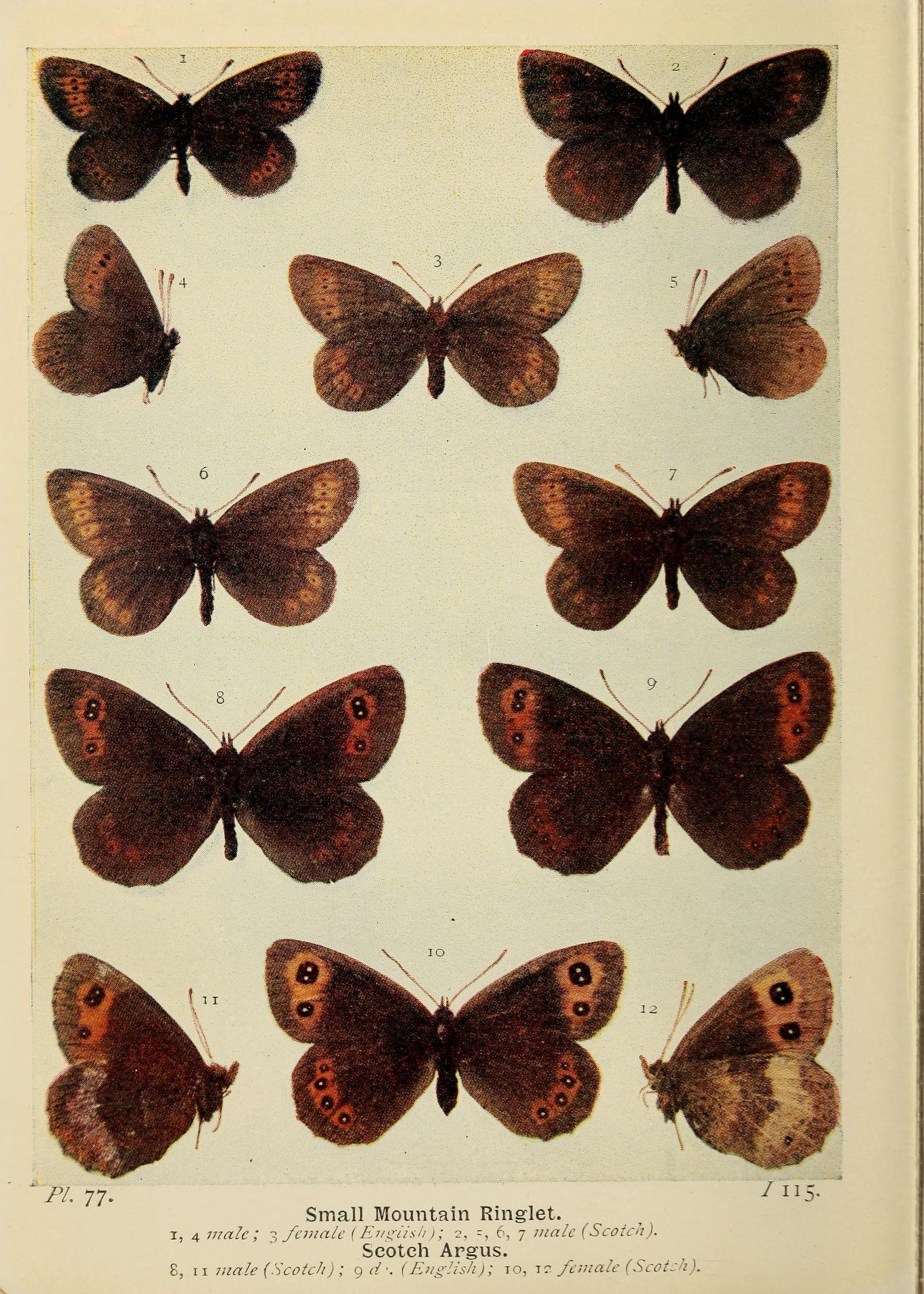
Plate 77

Description in South (1906).

=== Adult ===
Wingspan 16–22 millimetres (0.63–0.87 in). "The typical form of this butterfly, epiphron, Knock, has the tawny bands unbroken on the fore wings, and almost so on the hind wings; the black dots on the hind wings of the female are often pupilled with white, and more rarely this is so in the male also. It has been stated that specimens occur in Perthshire which exhibit these characters. All the British examples of the small mountain ringlet that I have seen are referable to the form known as cassiope, Fab. (Plate 77). The tawny, or orange, bands are rarely so entire on the fore wings as in epiphron, and are generally rather narrower; and that on the hind wing is broken up into three or four rings. The black dots are usually smaller and without white pupils. The female is somewhat larger and the bands or rings paler. Variation in the markings is extensive. The bands on the fore wings become less and less complete, until they are reduced to a series of mere rings around the black dots. The black dots decrease in size and in number until they, together with the tawny marking, entirely disappear, and a plain blackish-brown insect only remains. This extreme form has been named obsoleta, Tutt. The earliest rings to vanish seem to be the third on the fore wings and the first on the hind wings. Similar modifications occur on the underside also, but there may be an aberration on the upper side of a specimen, and not, or at least not in the same way, on the underside."

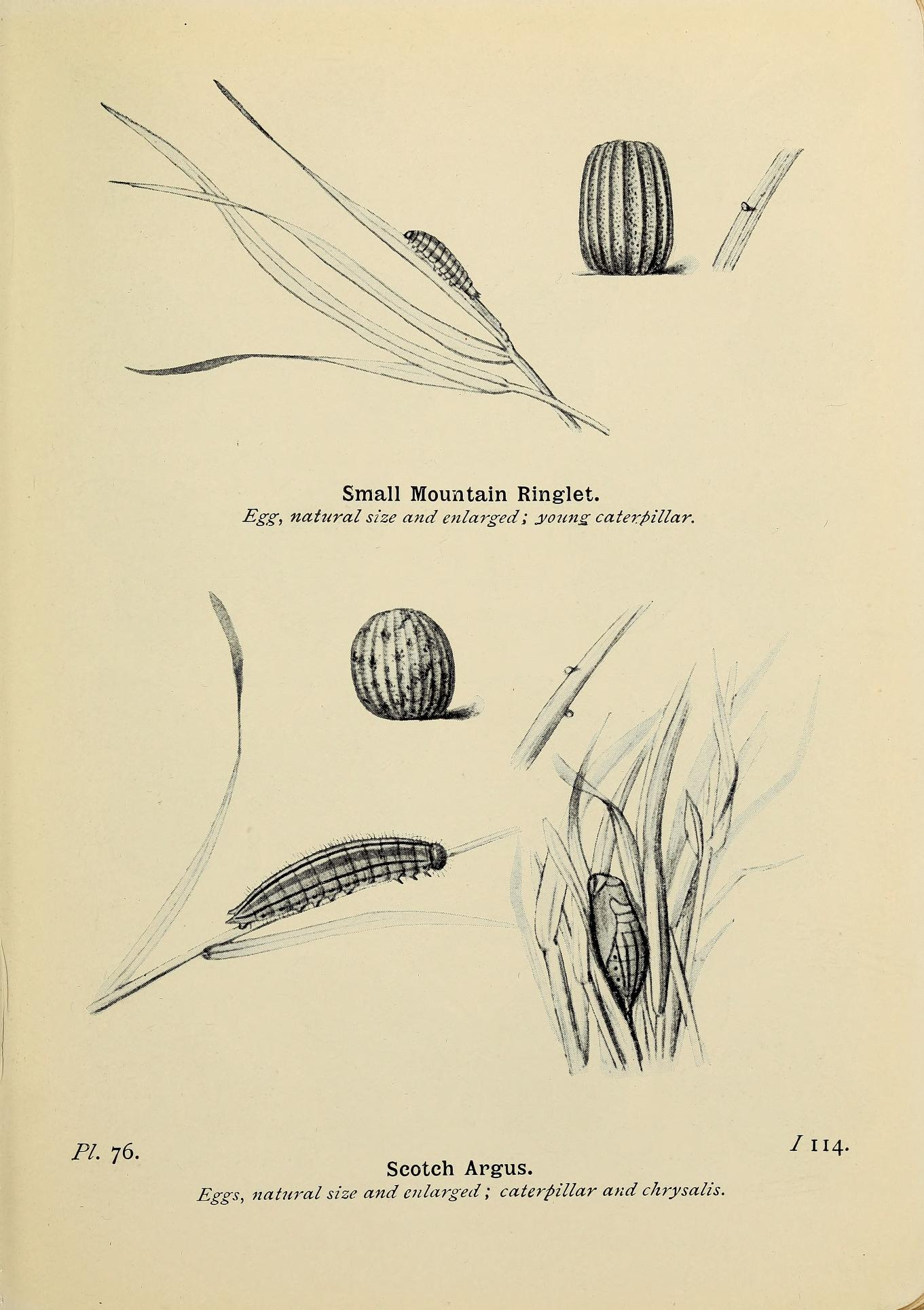
Plate 76

Wheeler (1903) gives a short description

=== Early stages ===
"The egg when first laid, is yellow, changing afterwards to fawn color with darker markings, especially towards the top. It is laid in July on blades of grass. The larva hatches in about sixteen days. The young caterpillar, before hibernation in October, is greenish, with darker green and yellow lines. Head brownish. Feeds in July and after hibernation on various grasses, among which Poa annua, Festuca ovina, Aira praecox, and A. caespitosa have been specified as eaten by caterpillars in confinement. A distinct preference, however, has been shown for mat grass (Nardus strictus), and it has been suggested that this may be the natural food. The full-grown caterpillar appears to be undescribed. The chrysalis is described by Buckler as being "little more than three-eighths of an inch in length, rather thick in proportion, being less dumpy in form than hyperanthtis, but more so than blandina [Erebia cethiops]. The color of the back of the thorax and wing cases is a light green, rather glaucous; the abdomen a pale drab or dirty whitish; a dark brown dorsal streak is conspicuous on the thorax, and there is the faintest possible indication of its being continued as a stripe along the abdomen. The eye-, trunk-, antenna-, and leg-cases are margined with dark brown, and the wing nervures are indicated by the same colors."

== Subspecies ==
- Erebia epiphron epiphron Harz Mountains
- Erebia epiphron aetheria Esper, 1805
- Erebia epiphron mackeri Fuchs, 1914 (synonym Erebia epiphron vögesiaca Goltz, 1914)
- Erebia epiphron mnemon Haworth, 1812 (synonym Erebia epiphron scotica Cooke, 1943)
- Erebia epiphron orientpyreanica Eisner, 1946 (synonym Erebia epiphron fauveani) Pyrénées-Orientales
- Erebia epiphron pyreanica Herrich-Schläffer, 1851
- Erebia epiphron silasiana Meyer-Dür, 1852
- Erebia epiphron transylvanica Rebel, 1908
- Erebia epiphron retyezatensis Warren 1931
- Erebia epiphron roosi Arnscheid & Sterba
- Erebia epiphron orientalis or Erebia orientalis Bulgaria
- Erebia epiphron nelamus high altitude

Hybrid Erebia serotina epiphron × Erebia pronoe
