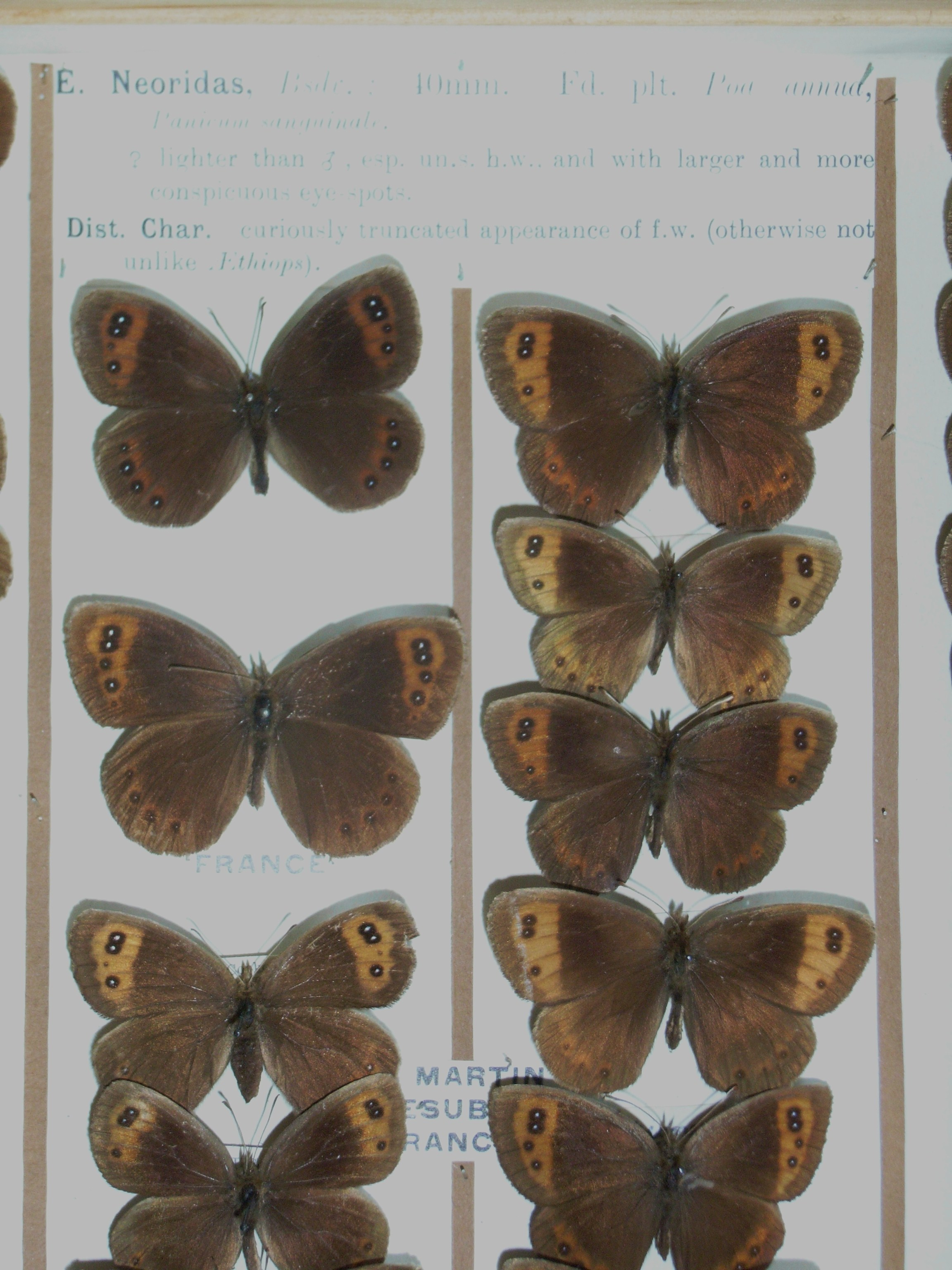
- From the Langham and Wheeler collection of the Ulster Museum

Scientific classification
- Kingdom: Animalia
- Phylum: Arthropoda
- Clade: Pancrustacea
- Class: Insecta
- Order: Lepidoptera
- Family: Nymphalidae
- Genus: Erebia
- Species: E. neoridas

Binomial name
- Erebia neoridas (Boisduval, 1828)

= Autumn ringlet =

Species of butterfly

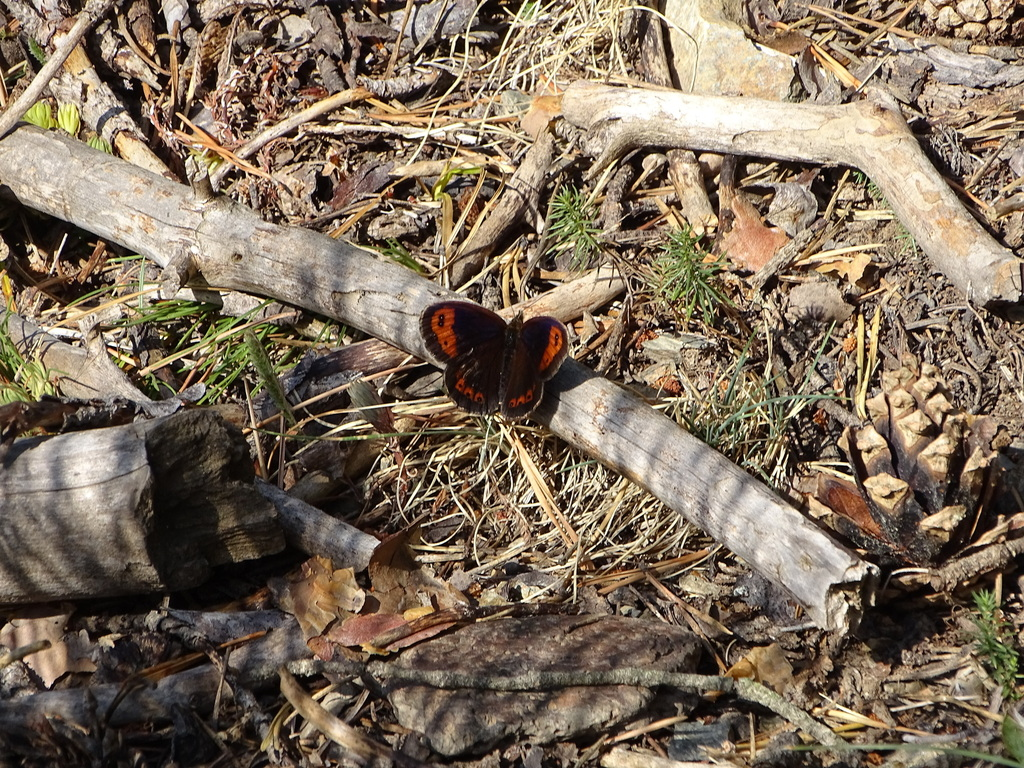
Erebia neoridas on the ground

The autumn ringlet (Erebia neoridas) is a member of the Satyridae subfamily of the family Nymphalidae. It is a high-mountain butterfly found in the Pyrenees, Alps and in Italy.

== Description in Seitz ==
E. neoridas Bsd. (37 d, e). Smaller than aethiops, to which it comes nearest. The distal band of the forewing light russet, being yellowish red in the female, broad at the costa, posteriorly narrower, and proximally sharply limited and exteriorly feebly incurved in the middle. The band bears anteriorly 2 white centred contiguous ocelli, followed near the hindmargin by a somewhat smaller one which is but occasionally centred with white. The band of the hindwing consists of 4 rounded or angular spots, of which 3 or 4 bear ocelli with minute white pupils. The band of the forewing is beneath more irregular and somewhat darker russet than above, the apex of the wing being dusted with bluish grey. The hindwing beneath grey-brown from the base to the middle, then there follows a proximally somewhat dentate ashy grey band, the distal area being of the same colour as the base; the ocelli are completely absent. The female is lighter throughout, the ocelli moreover are as a rule somewhat larger than in the male. The fringes brownish grey in the male white-grey in the female. — Oberthur figures as margarita a small specimen from the Eastern Pyrenees, the upperside vividly recalling that of zapateri, while the underside is as in neoridas. — The nymotypical form flies in the Basses Alpes, for instance in the neighbourhood of Digne. — Egg light grey, with dark ribs. Larva greenish yellow, with dark dorsal stripe, whitish side-stripe and dark-bordered white spiracles. Head with 2 dark spots, brown, as are also the legs. On Poa annua and Panicum sanguinale. The butterfly from June to September.
