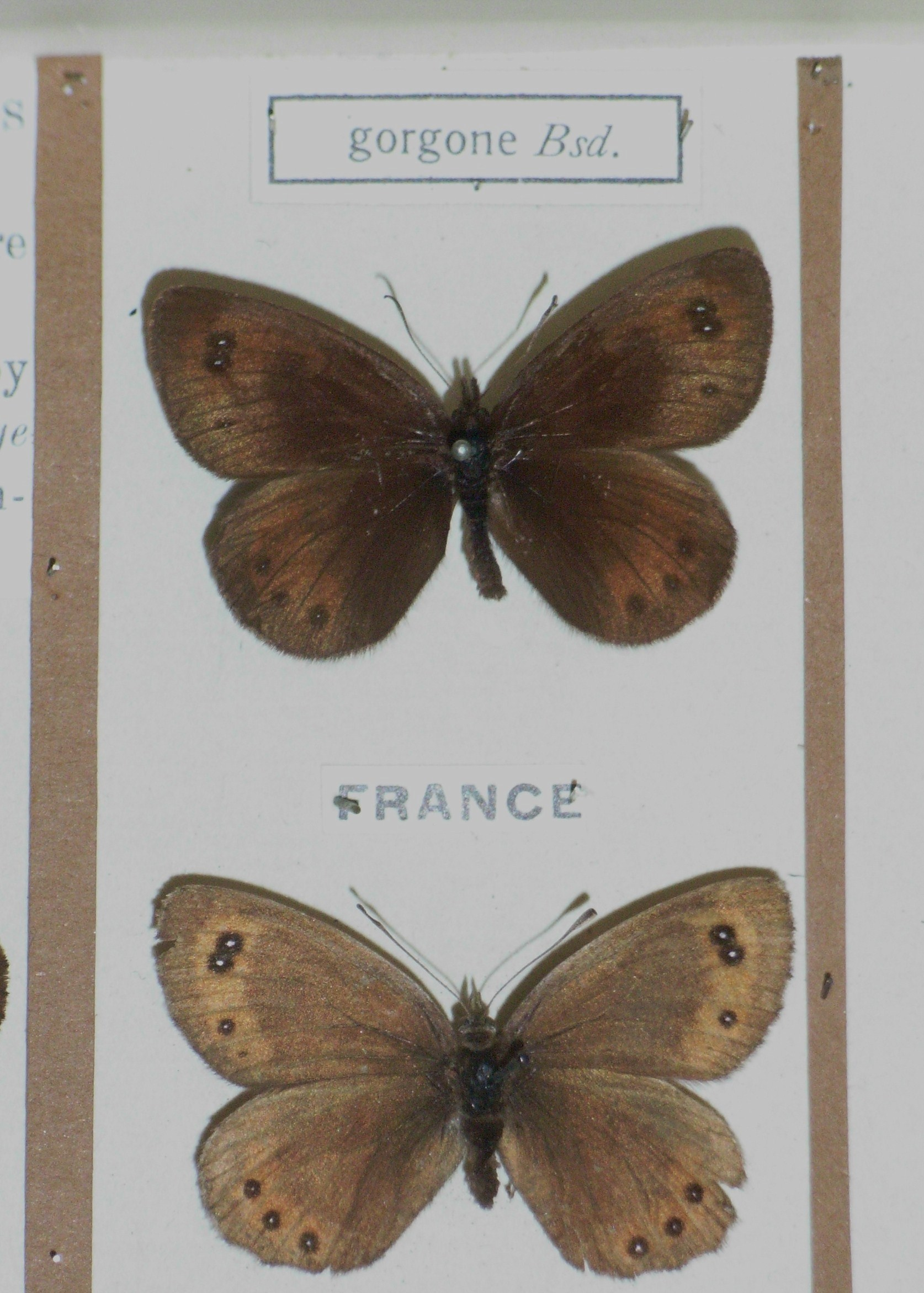
- Langham and Wheeler collection - Ulster Museum

Conservation status
- Near Threatened (IUCN 3.1)

Scientific classification
- Kingdom: Animalia
- Phylum: Arthropoda
- Class: Insecta
- Order: Lepidoptera
- Family: Nymphalidae
- Genus: Erebia
- Species: E. gorgone

Binomial name
- Erebia gorgone Boisduval, 1832

= Gavarnie ringlet =

Species of butterfly

The Gavarnie ringlet (Erebia gorgone) is a member of the subfamily Satyrinae of the family Nymphalidae. It is a high-altitude butterfly found in France and Spain, notably at Cirque de Gavarnie in the Pyrenees National Park.

Adults are on wing in July and August.

The larvae feed on various Poa species. The species overwinters in the larval stage.
