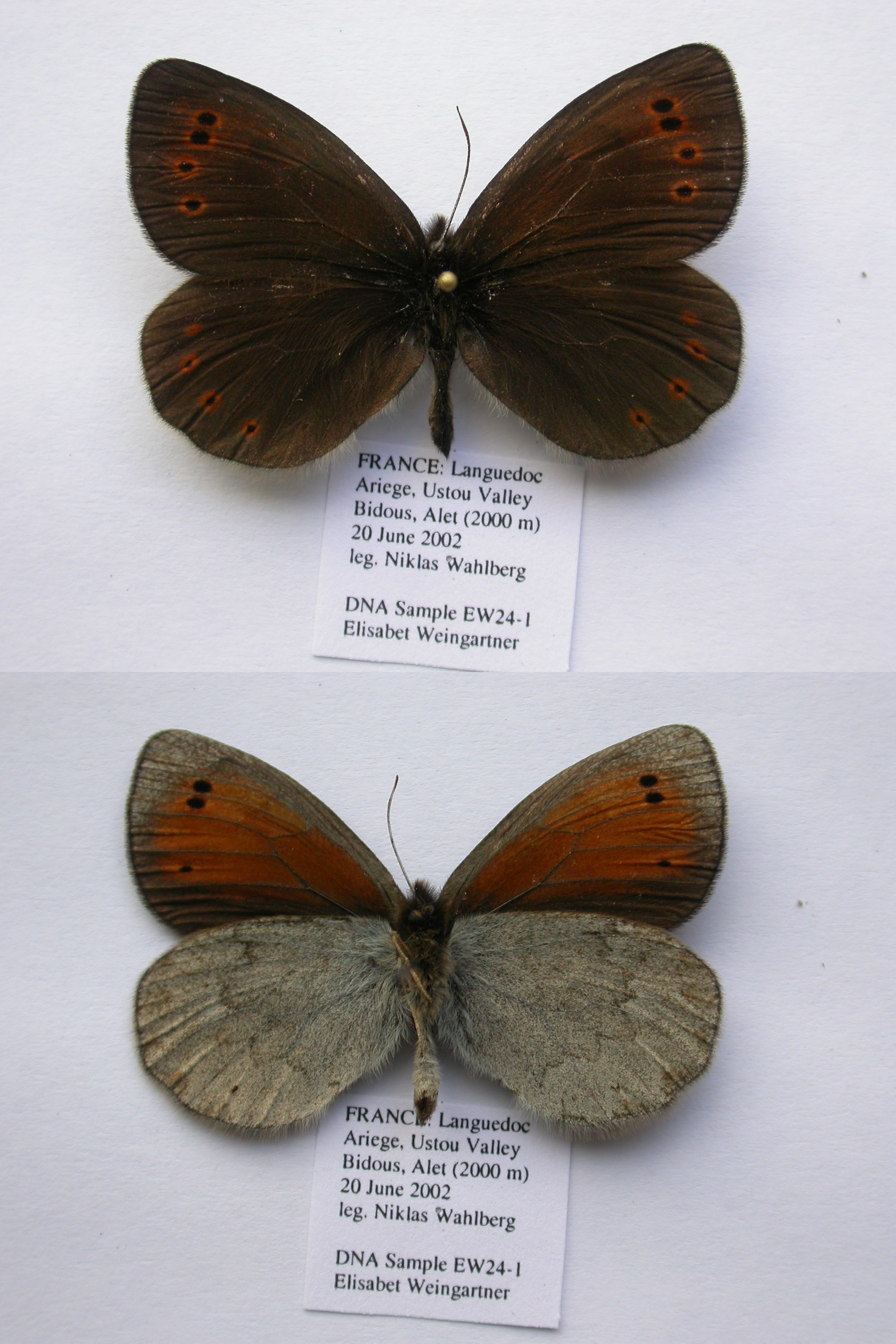

Conservation status
- Near Threatened (IUCN 3.1)

Scientific classification
- Kingdom: Animalia
- Phylum: Arthropoda
- Class: Insecta
- Order: Lepidoptera
- Family: Nymphalidae
- Genus: Erebia
- Species: E. sthennyo

Binomial name
- Erebia sthennyo Graslin, 1850

= Erebia sthennyo =

False dewy ringlet

Species of butterfly

Erebia sthennyo, the false dewy ringlet, is a member of the subfamily Satyrinae of the family Nymphalidae. It is found in the Pyrenees in Spain and France. In Spain it is found in the central Pyrenees in Puerto de Portalet, Monte Perdido and Puerto de Benasque, in France it is found from Pic du Midi d'Ossau to Pic du Midi de Bigorre and Luchon, as well as from Port de Salau to Andorra. It is found at heights from 1,800 meters upwards.

The wingspan is 40–44 mm. Adults are on wing from the end of June to the beginning of August in one generation.

The larvae feed on various grasses.
