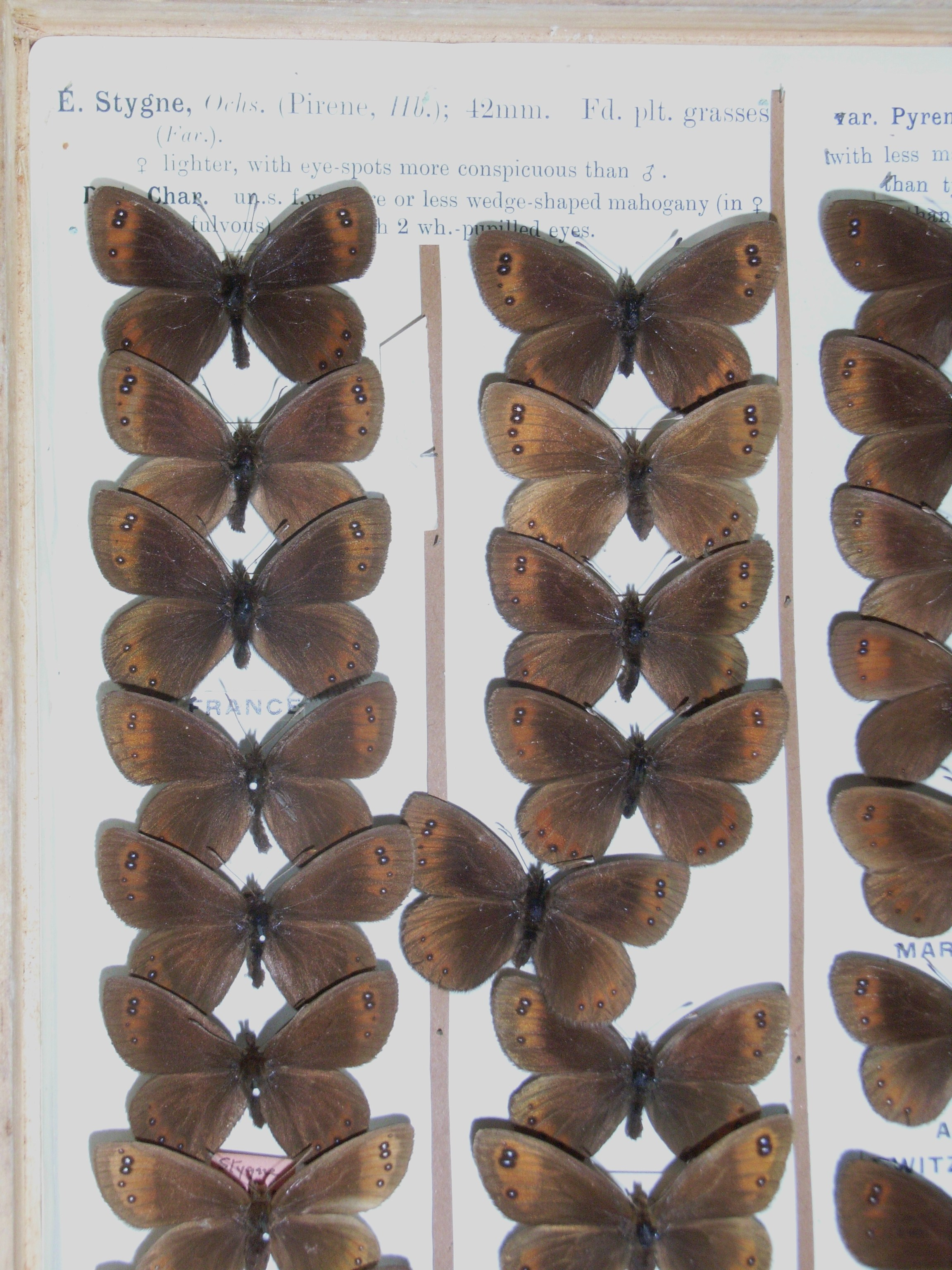
- As Erebia stygne (Langham and Wheeler collection - Ulster Museum)

Scientific classification
- Kingdom: Animalia
- Phylum: Arthropoda
- Clade: Pancrustacea
- Class: Insecta
- Order: Lepidoptera
- Family: Nymphalidae
- Genus: Erebia
- Species: E. meolans

Binomial name
- Erebia meolans (De Prunner, 1798)

= Piedmont ringlet =

Species of butterfly

The Piedmont ringlet (Erebia meolans) is a member of the family Nymphalidae. It is an Alpine butterfly.

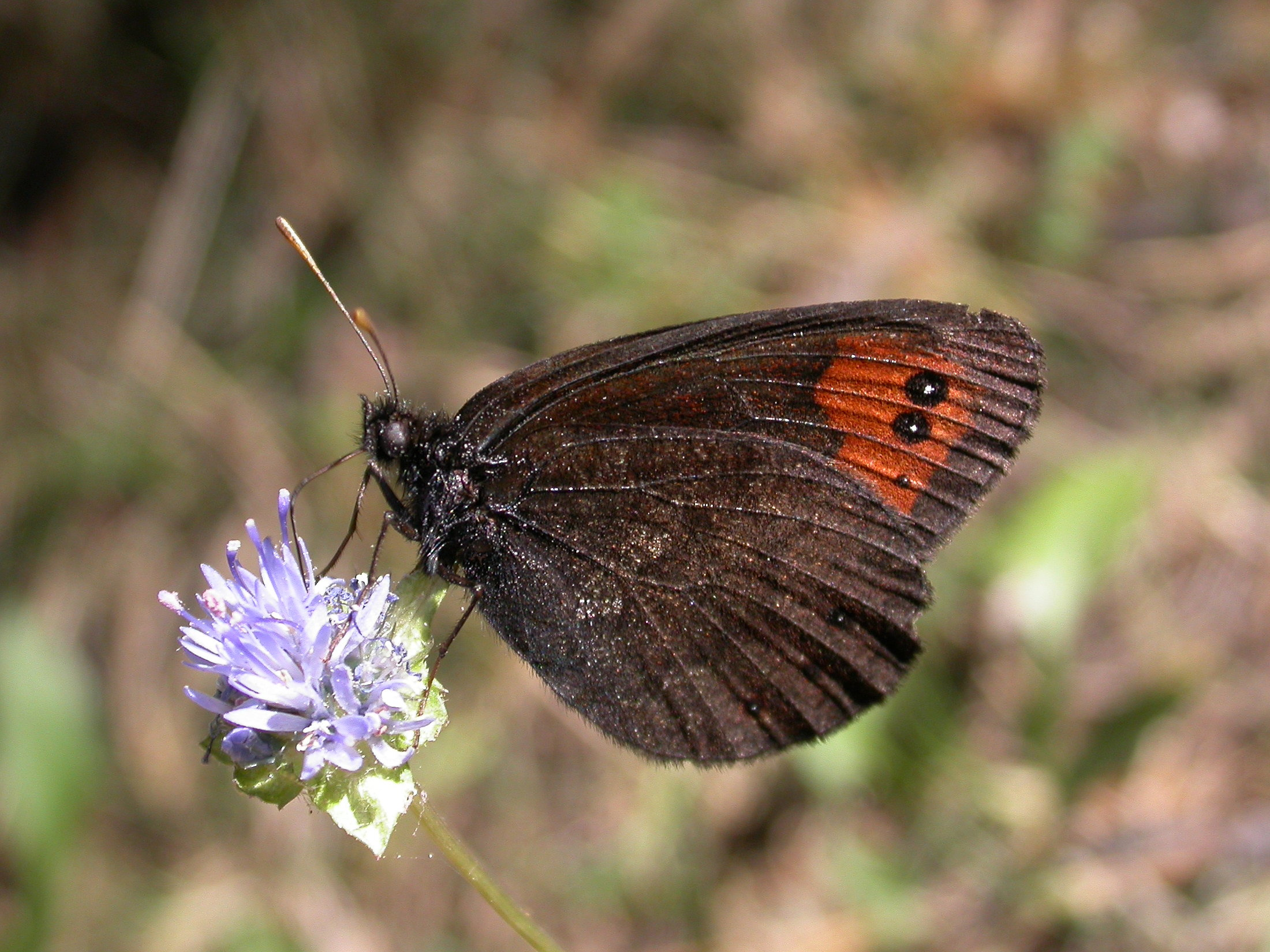

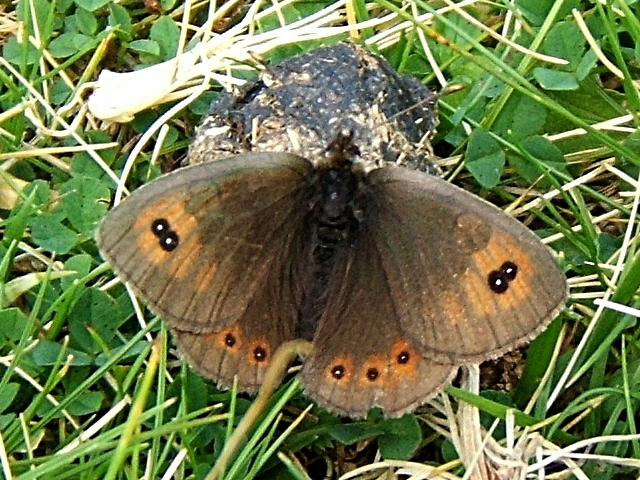

== Description in Seitz ==
E. stygne O. (= pirene Hbn).) (35 g).The upper side of both wings is dark black-brown. The forewing has before the distal margin a russet-brown band which is broad anteriorly, strongly tapering behind, and bears 2 white-centred black ocelli in its upper portion; towards the hind margin an additional, somewhat smaller, ocellus is visible. The hindwing has 3—4 white-centred ocelli which are edged with brown. The underside of the forewing in both males and females is a little lighter than the upper side, the distal band being broader, lighter brown and continuous. The hindwing beneath is dark brown in males, and brown grey in females . The ocelli as on the upper side, but smaller, and narrowly edged with brown. Specimens from the Black Forest are much brighter coloured, the broad russet yellow band of the forewing commences near the costal margin of the forewing and extends to the hind margin, remaining of nearly even width. In the band there are always 3 - 5 large black white-centred ocelli, and, especially often in females, there is above the first ocellus, towards the apex, an additional smaller ocellus with white pupil, this ocellus is not visible beneath. On the hindwing the brown band is as wide as on the forewing, the ocelli, 3-4 in number, are likewise large and have conspicuous white pupils. — The form pyrenaica Ruhl, which is found in the Western Pyrenees in June, differs from the first-described form only in the reduction of the red colour. — in ab. valesiaca Elw., which occurs in Wallis as well on the Simplon, and even in the Pyrenees, the russet-red is effaced in females except for faint traces, which is altogether absent from males. — stygne occurs in the Black Forest and the Thuringian Forest, the Jura, Alps, Vosges, the Pyrenees, and Apennines and extends eastwards to Armenia; in June and July; the butterfly begins to appear already below 3000 ft. and goes rarely above the tree-line.
