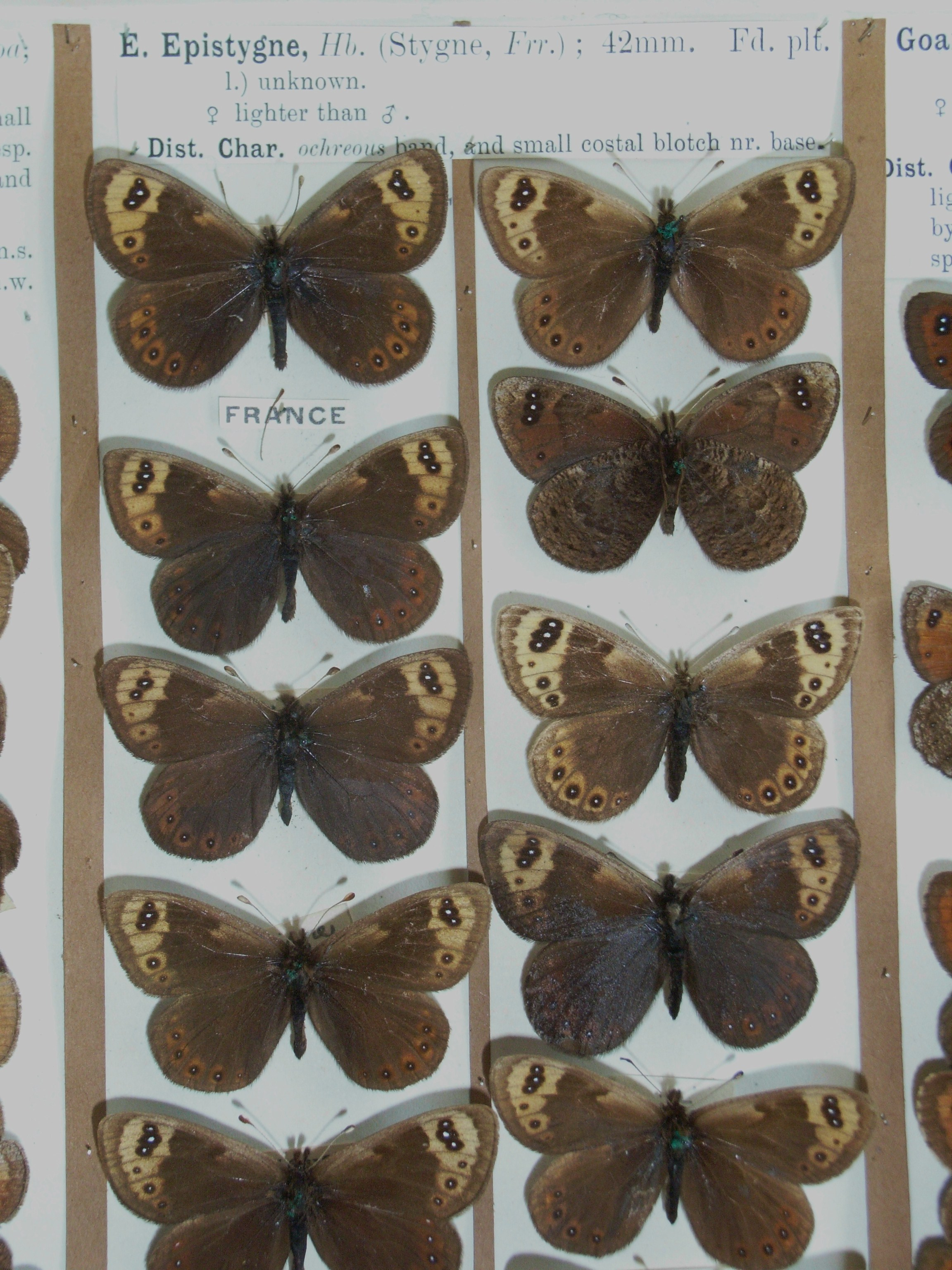

Conservation status
- Vulnerable (IUCN 3.1)

Scientific classification
- Kingdom: Animalia
- Phylum: Arthropoda
- Clade: Pancrustacea
- Class: Insecta
- Order: Lepidoptera
- Family: Nymphalidae
- Genus: Erebia
- Species: E. epistygne

Binomial name
- Erebia epistygne (Hübner, 1824)

= Erebia epistygne =

Species of butterfly

Erebia epistygne, the spring ringlet, is a species of butterfly in the family Nymphalidae. It is found in France and Spain. Its natural habitat is temperate grassland.

The length of the forewings is 22–25 mm. Wheeler (1903) gives a short description.

== Description in Seitz ==
E epistygne Hbn. = stygne Hbn.) (37c). Above coffee-brown, costal margin dusted with grey; the forewing has usually a diffuse yellow spot in the cell and a broad, posteriorly narrowing, light ochreous, submarginal band which is distinctly divided by the veins. There as 5-6 white-centred black ocelli in the band 3 near the apex being larger and united and 3 placed further back smaller and having minute white pupils. The submarginal band of the hindwing consists of 4-5 oval russet-red spots, each bearing a small white-centred ocellus. The forewing beneath russet-red, the distal band somewhat lighter and traversed by the brown veins; costal and distal margins and the apex grey with brownish atoms. The hindwing grey-brown beneath, dusted with grey and dark brown, the middle band is darker than the basal and distal areas and distally crenate, the ocelli being represented in the latter by black dots. The female is not essentially different from the male on the upperside, the ground-colour is somewhat lighter, the spots of the distal band of the hindwing are not russet-red, but more reddish yellow, the ocelli situated in the same having larger and brighter pupils. The underside of the hindwing white-grey, dusted with brown, the middle band strongly prominent, being distally edged with white, the veins traversing the same white-grey. Specimens from South Spain are essentially brighter in markings, the submarginal band of the forewing is broader and extends with almost even width to the hindmargin, not being ochreous but light whitish yellow; otherwise the markings are not different. - The butterfly occurs from the beginning of March to the end of April in South France, the Basses Alpes, and in Central and South Spain.

Adults are on wing from March to May.

Its larval host plant is the grass Festuca ovina (Poaceae). Although it has also been reported from other Festuca and Poa species.

The species is vulnerable because of severe habitat loss.
