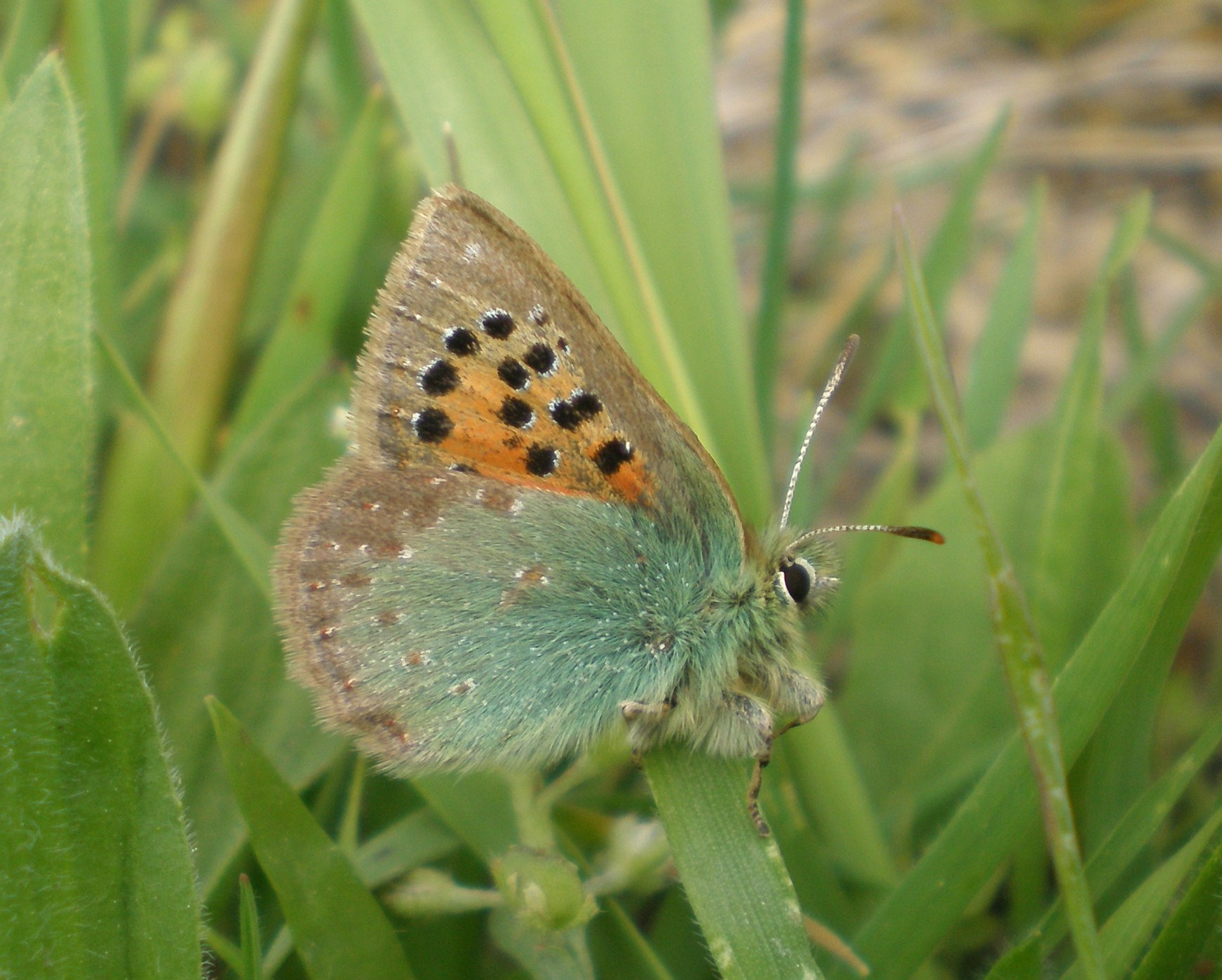

Scientific classification
- Kingdom: Animalia
- Phylum: Arthropoda
- Class: Insecta
- Order: Lepidoptera
- Family: Lycaenidae
- Genus: Tomares
- Species: T. ballus

Binomial name
- Tomares ballus Fabricius, 1787

= Tomares ballus =

Species of butterfly

Tomares ballus, the Provence hairstreak or cardenillo, is a butterfly of the family Lycaenidae. It is found on the Iberian Peninsula, northern Africa and along the Mediterranean coast of France.

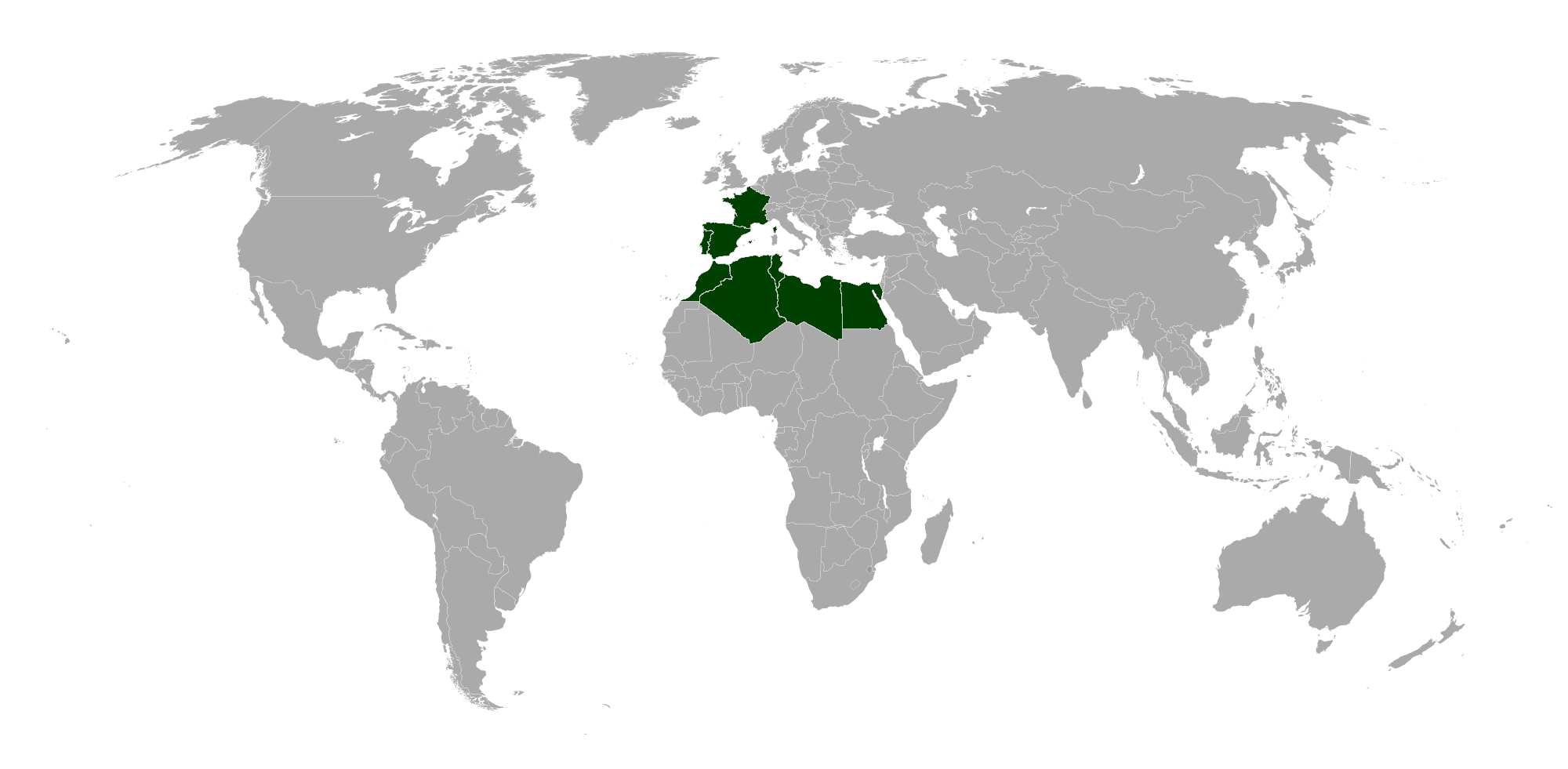
Distribution

== Description in Seitz ==
T. ballus F. (75 d, e). male above dark brown, with traces of small red spots in the anal area of the hindwing. In the (larger) female the forewing red-yellow except the costal and distal margins, there being a similarly coloured ovate band-like spot before the distal margin of the hindmargin. The underside of both sexes recalls that of Chrysophanus phlaeas, but the basal area of the hindwing is dusted with verdigris. French Riviera, Spain, North Africa. — The egg green, somewhat flat, with a network of polygonals, laid singly on the upperside of leaves of Boujeania hispida. Larva rather thick, not so flat as in many other Lycaenids, the segments swollen, separated from each other by deep incisions; greenish yellow, with bluish dorsal stripe and a red-brown lateral one, there being thin oblique streaks between them; until the end of May in the pods of the food-plant. Pupa ovate, rounded everywhere, with shallow minute puncturation; as far as known the larva pupates free on the ground. The butterflies from February till April in places where the food-plant grows, often exceedingly plentiful. The specimen, when covered with the net, often drops to the ground and conceals itself in the grass. The wingspan is 28–30 mm. The butterfly flies from January to April.

The larvae feed on Astragalus lusitanicus, Medicago, Dorycnium, Lotus and Anthyllis.
