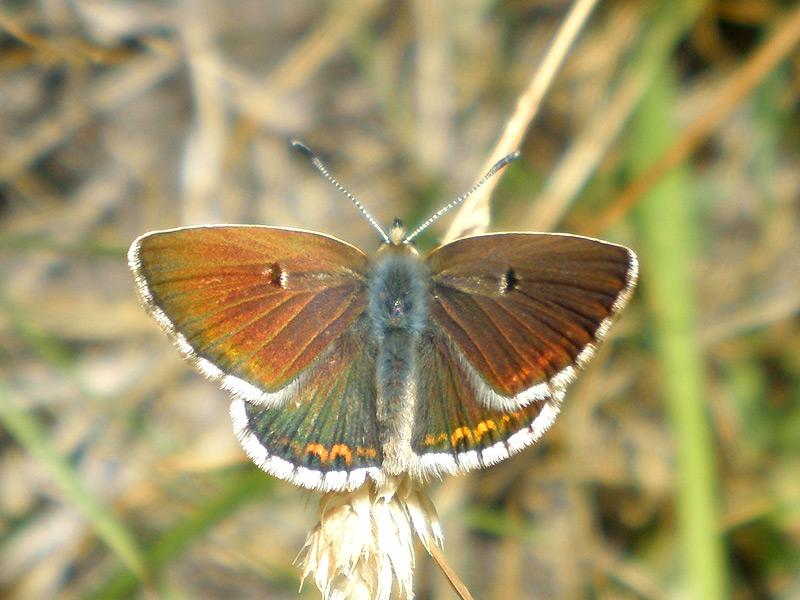

Scientific classification
- Domain: Eukaryota
- Kingdom: Animalia
- Phylum: Arthropoda
- Class: Insecta
- Order: Lepidoptera
- Family: Lycaenidae
- Genus: Aricia
- Species: A. morronensis

Binomial name
- Aricia morronensis (Ribbe, 1910)

Synonyms
- Lycaena morronensis Ribbe, 1910; Aricia idas Rambur, 1840; Aricia ramburi Verity, 1913; Aricia hesselbarthi Manley, 1970; Aricia morronensis ramburi; Aricia morronensis hesselbarthi

= Aricia morronensis =

Spanish argus

Species of butterfly

Aricia morronensis, the Spanish argus, is a butterfly of the family Lycaenidae. It is found in Spain and Hautes-Pyrénées (France).

The wingspan is 22–26 mm. Adults are on wing from June to September in usually one, but sometimes two generations per year.

The larvae feed on the leaves of Erodium species. They are attended by ants. The species overwinters in the larval stage.

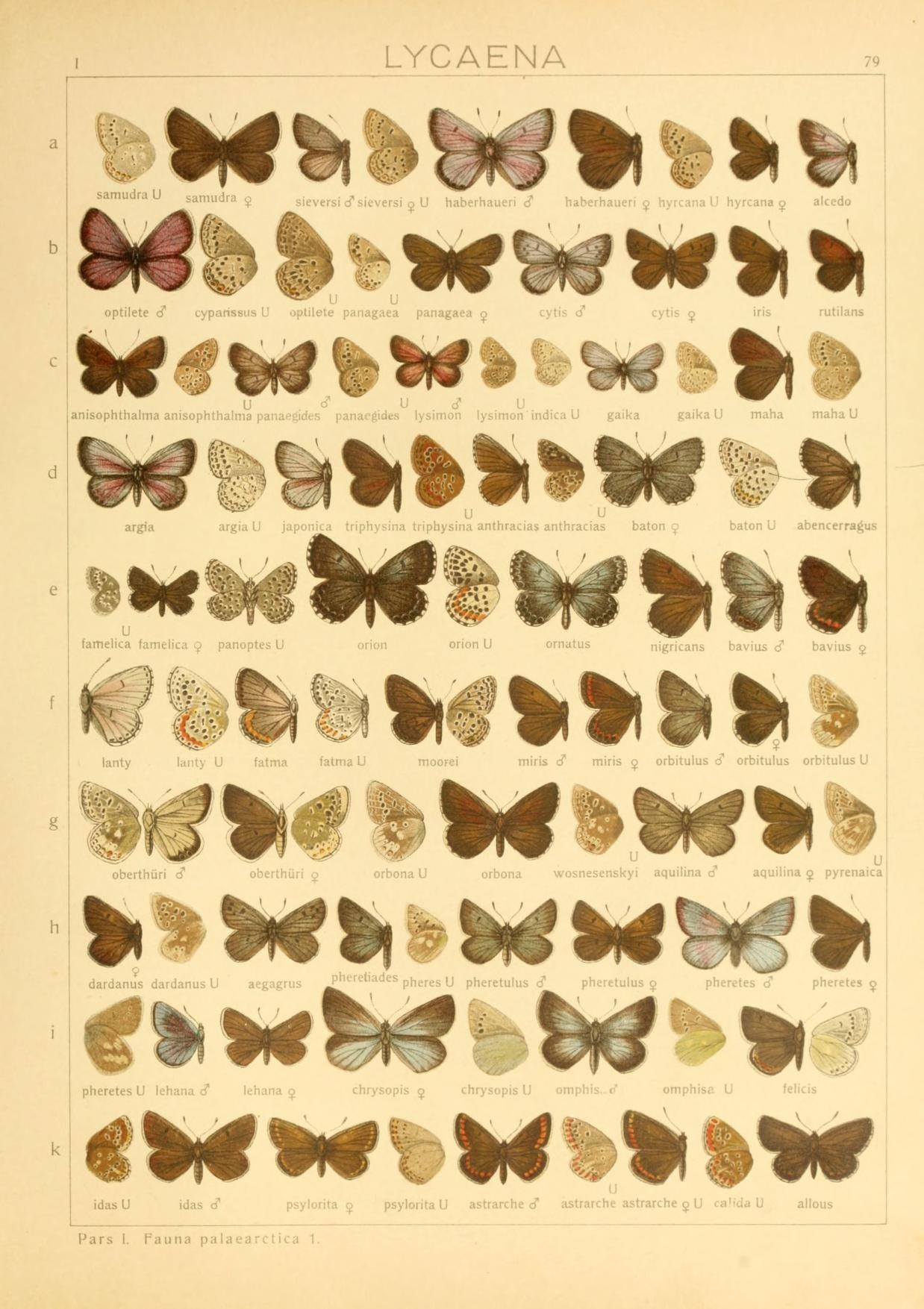
Seitz 80k

== Description from Seitz ==
L. idas Rbr. (79 k). Above black-brown with dark median spot on the forewing, the fringes pale, only slightly darkened at the tips of the veins. Underside coffee-brown, with feeble reddish tinge, the ocelli being similarly arranged as in astrarche; the hindwing with pale longitudinal streak from the centre of the wing to the middle of the outer margin, the streak being generally much more prominent than in our figure. — In the Sierra Nevada, at 1000 ft., in July.

== Subspecies ==
- Aricia morronensis morronensis present in Andalusia (South Spain) and South Albacete and Murcia.
- Aricia morronensis hersselbarthi (Manley, 1970) in Abejar (Soria, Spain)
- Aricia morronensis ramburi (Verity, 1913) present in Sierra Nevada
- Aricia morronensis boudrani (Leraut, 1999) present at the Col du Tourmalet and the Cirque de Gavarnie des Hautes-Pyrénées.
