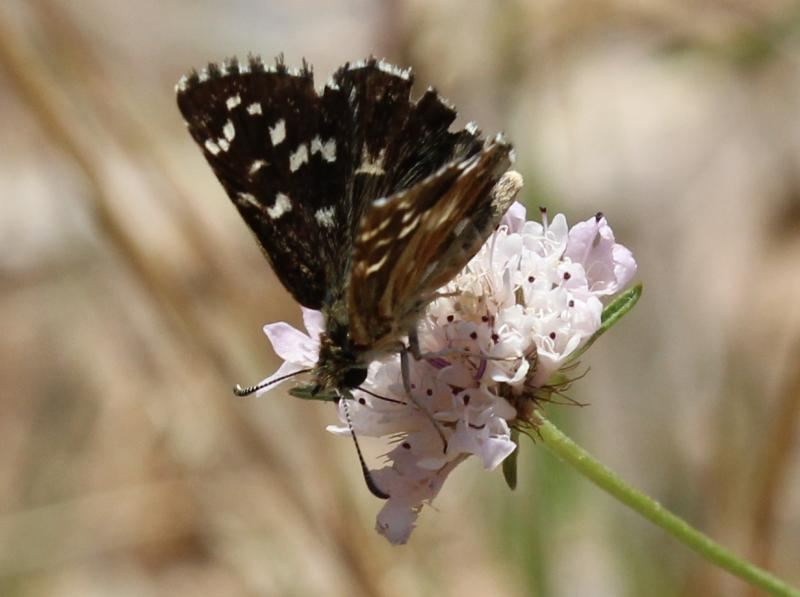

Scientific classification
- Kingdom: Animalia
- Phylum: Arthropoda
- Class: Insecta
- Order: Lepidoptera
- Family: Hesperiidae
- Genus: Pyrgus
- Species: P. bellieri

Binomial name
- Pyrgus bellieri (Oberthür, 1910)

= Foulquier's grizzled skipper =

Species of skipper butterfly genus Pyrgus

Foulquier's grizzled skipper (Pyrgus bellieri, syn. P. foulquieri) is a species of skipper (family Hesperiidae). It has a limited distribution in central and southern France and adjacent areas of Spain and Italy and also Corsica. Within this range it can be quite common.

As with other Pyrgus species, this is very difficult to identify in the field. It is often paler than most of its congeners with a yellowish suffusion, especially in the female. The hindwings usually have pale markings forming a continuous band. The wingspan is 26–30 mm. See Juan L. Hernández-Roldán and Miguel L. Munguira 2008 for differentiation from P. alveus

The adults are on the wing in July and August.

The larval food plant is Potentilla.

The species name honours Gedeon Foulquier.
