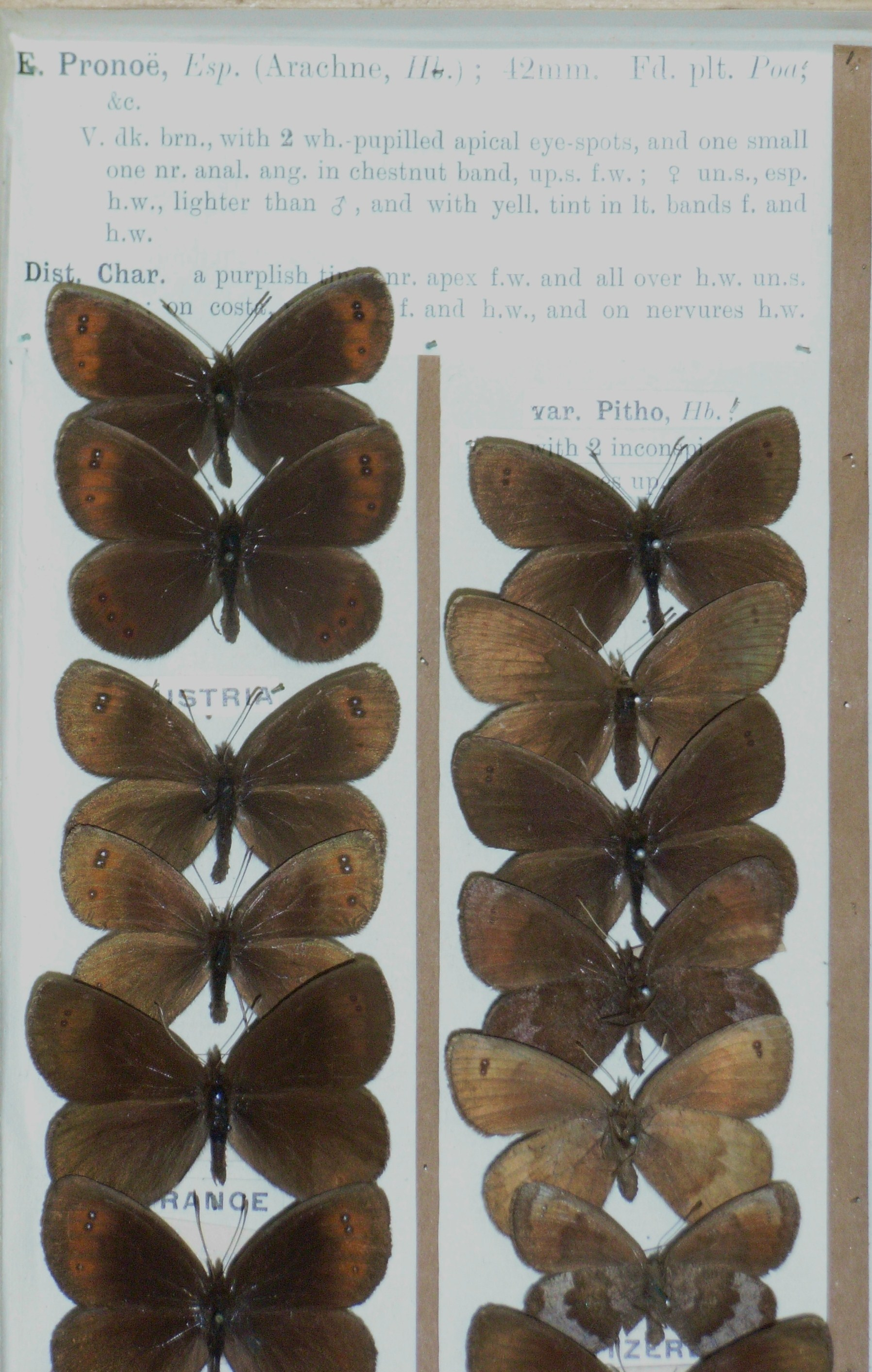
- Museum specimens.Langham and Wheeler collection.Ulster Museum.

Scientific classification
- Kingdom: Animalia
- Phylum: Arthropoda
- Class: Insecta
- Order: Lepidoptera
- Family: Nymphalidae
- Genus: Erebia
- Species: E. pronoe

Binomial name
- Erebia pronoe (Esper ,1780)

= Water ringlet =

Species of butterfly

The water ringlet (Erebia pronoe) is a member of the subfamily Satyrinae of family Nymphalidae. It is a high altitude (mainly between 900 and 2,800 meters) butterfly found in the Alps, Bavaria, Styria, Pyrenees, Carpathians and Bulgaria.

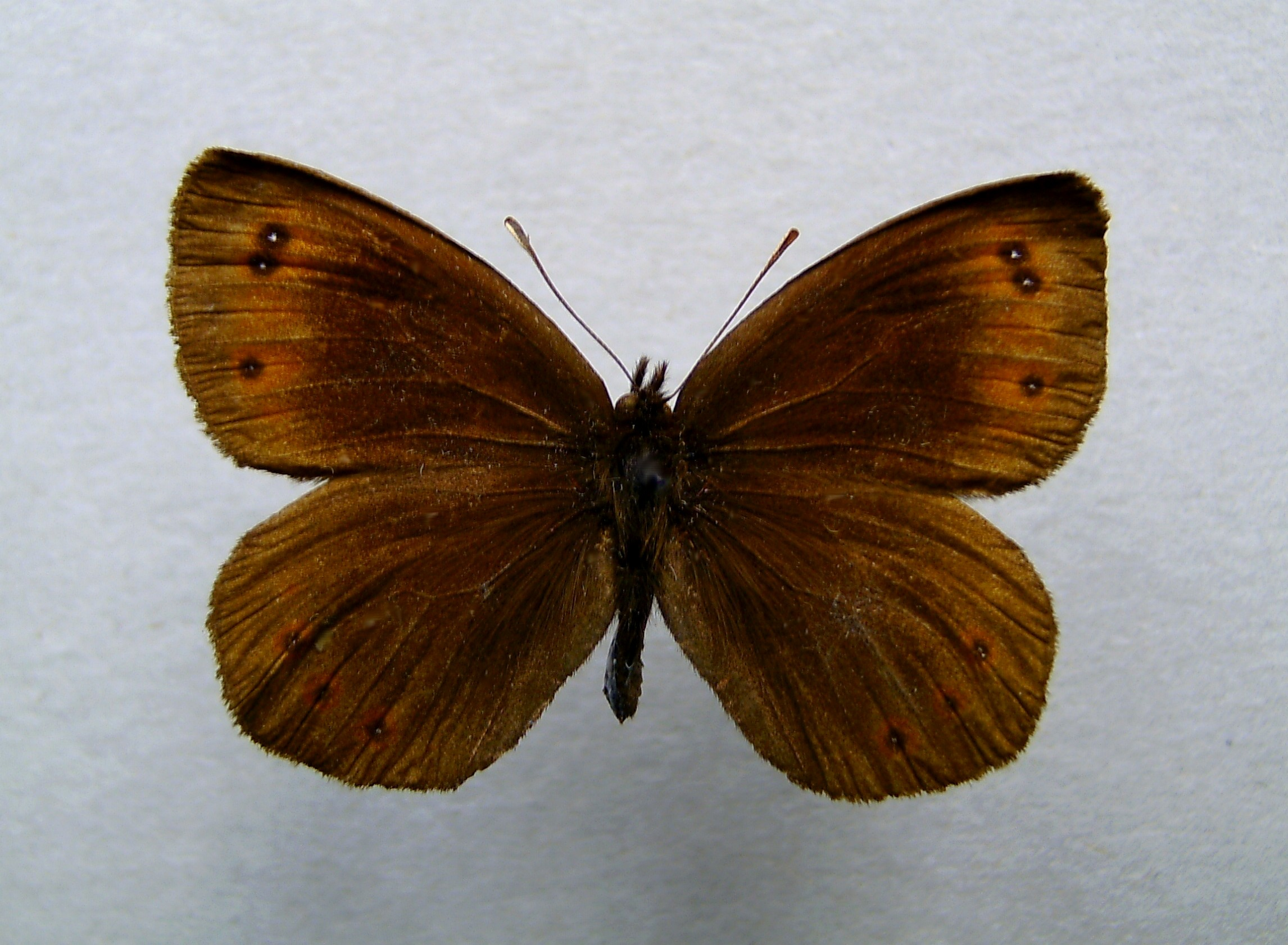

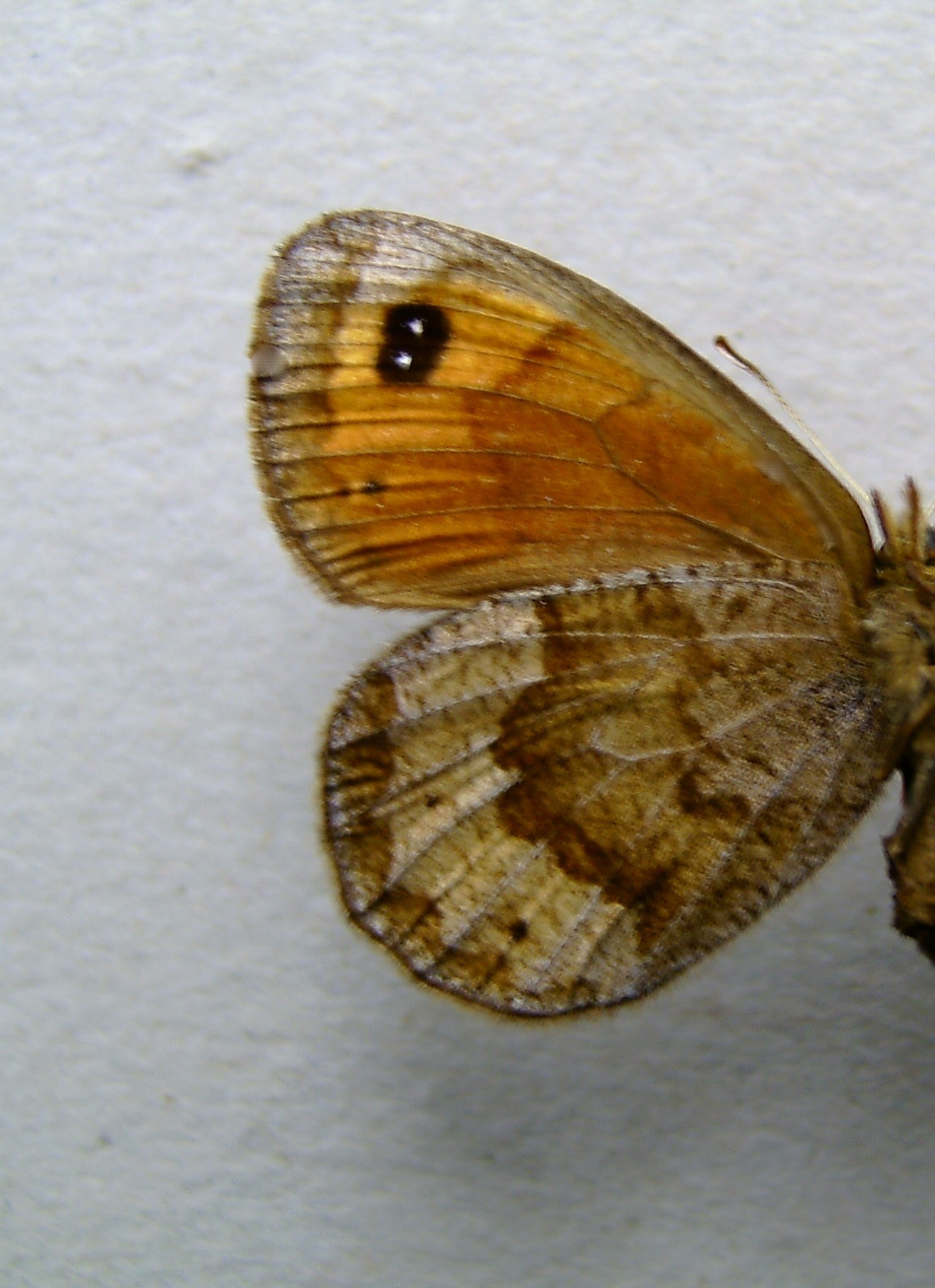
Underside

The wingspan is 36–46 mm.

== Description in Seitz ==
E pronoe Esp. (= arachne Hbn.) (37 c). Dark black -brown, with a red -brown band which is anteriorly broader and posteriorly narrower and bears costally 2 white-centred ocelli and towards the hindmargin an additional smaller one. The band of the hindwing consists of 3 rounded russet-brown spots with black eye-dots which have occasionally white pupils. Underside of the forewing sombre red-brown the band lighter and distinctly contrasting; the distal margin and apex dusted with bluish grey. The hindwing beneath bluish- or ashy- grey with black -brown dusting; the centre traversed by a curved, posteriorly broadly dentate, almost uniformly brown band which sharply borders the distal area. In the latter there are one or two black blind ocelli. The female is much lighter above and beneath, with the markings more prominent than in the male, the ocelli being larger and the base and submarginal band of the hindwing beneath light white-grey, the brown middle hand contrasting sharply. Distributed over the whole Alps, occurring also in the Apennines, Pyrenees, Carpathian Mts., South and South-West Russia and the southern slopes of the Caucasus. - In pitho Hbn (37c), which represents the species in the Swiss Alps and the southern Jura, the markings of the upperside are either entirely absent or there is only a reddish tint as a faint remnant of the same, the 2 ocelli near the apex are small and have minute white pupils. Some species [Sic] have no ocelli, being simply dark black-brown with some violet sheen. Underside as in the first described form - In the form almangoviae Stgr. the subcostal ocelli, though present in the brown band, are without distinct white pupils, those on the hindwing too having no white pupils or only traces of such. In the Allgau — Egg barrel-shaped, ribbed, white. Larva dirty reddish yellow, with a dark dorsal hue, the lateral markings consisting of streaks and the spiracles being black. From October to July on Poa. Pupa anteriorly bone -yellow marked with dark, abdomen cinnamon with dark incisions; so covered among the roots of grass that only the head is visible (Gross-Steyer). The butterfly appears in August and September, fluttering with a jerky flight in meadows and on grassy slopes of the mountain and alpine regions. In some years not rare, occurring up to 6000 ft. in the high ranges.

Adults are on wing from June to September in one generation.

The larvae feed on Festuca species.
