= George Wheeler (entomologist) =

English entomologist

George Wheeler (1858 – 9 December 1947) was an English entomologist who specialised in Lepidoptera. The Reverend George Wheeler M.A. wrote Butterflies of Switzerland (1935), and completed Volume 11 of British Lepidoptera by James William Tutt, after the Tutt's death in 1911. He was an avid collector, especially of "varieties" of Lepidoptera. George Wheeler was a Fellow of the Entomological Society of London, sometime elected Secretary and Vice-President. In 1933 he was honoured as a Special Life Fellow. He was also a Fellow of the Zoological Society of London.
