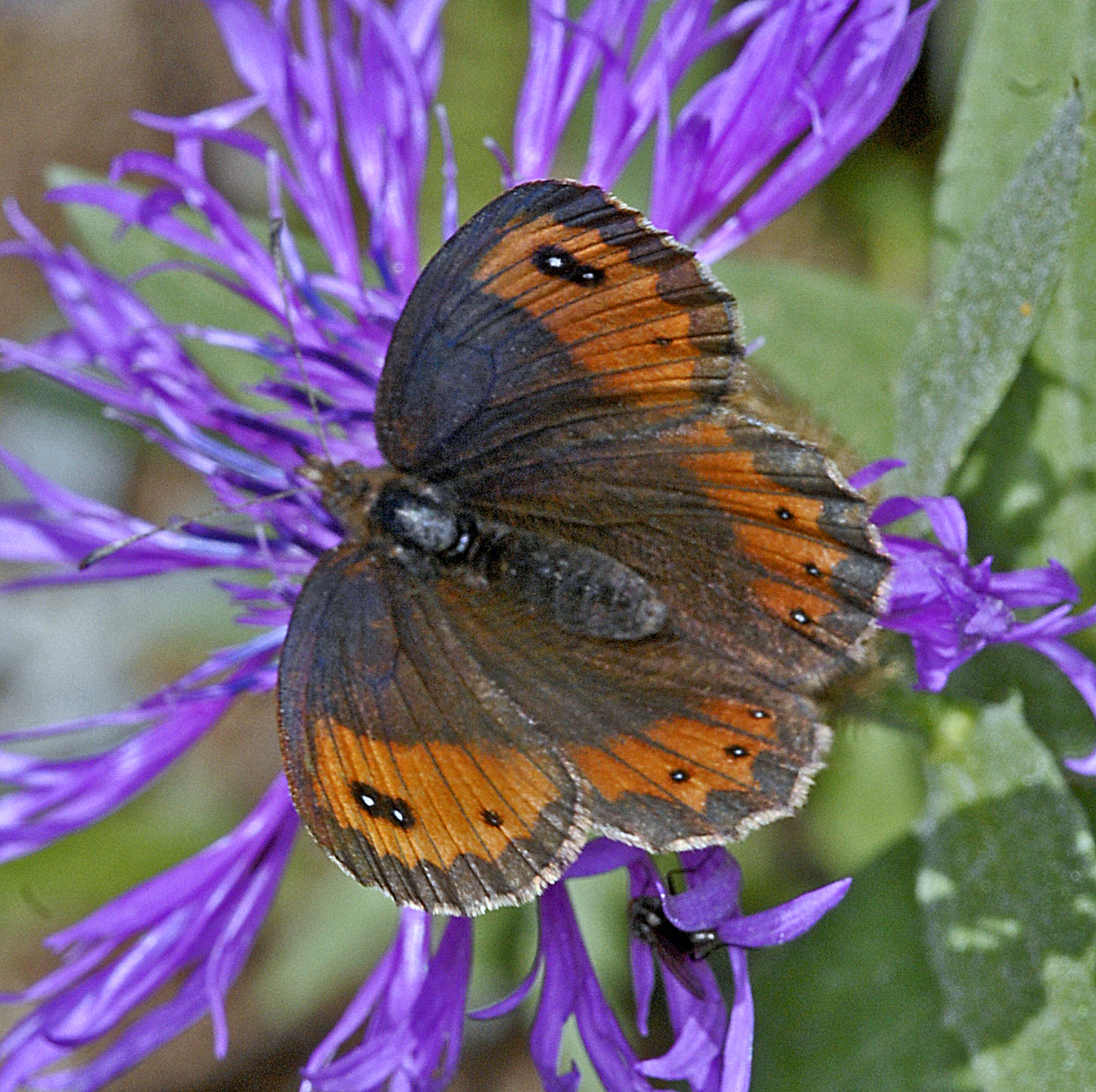
- Upperside
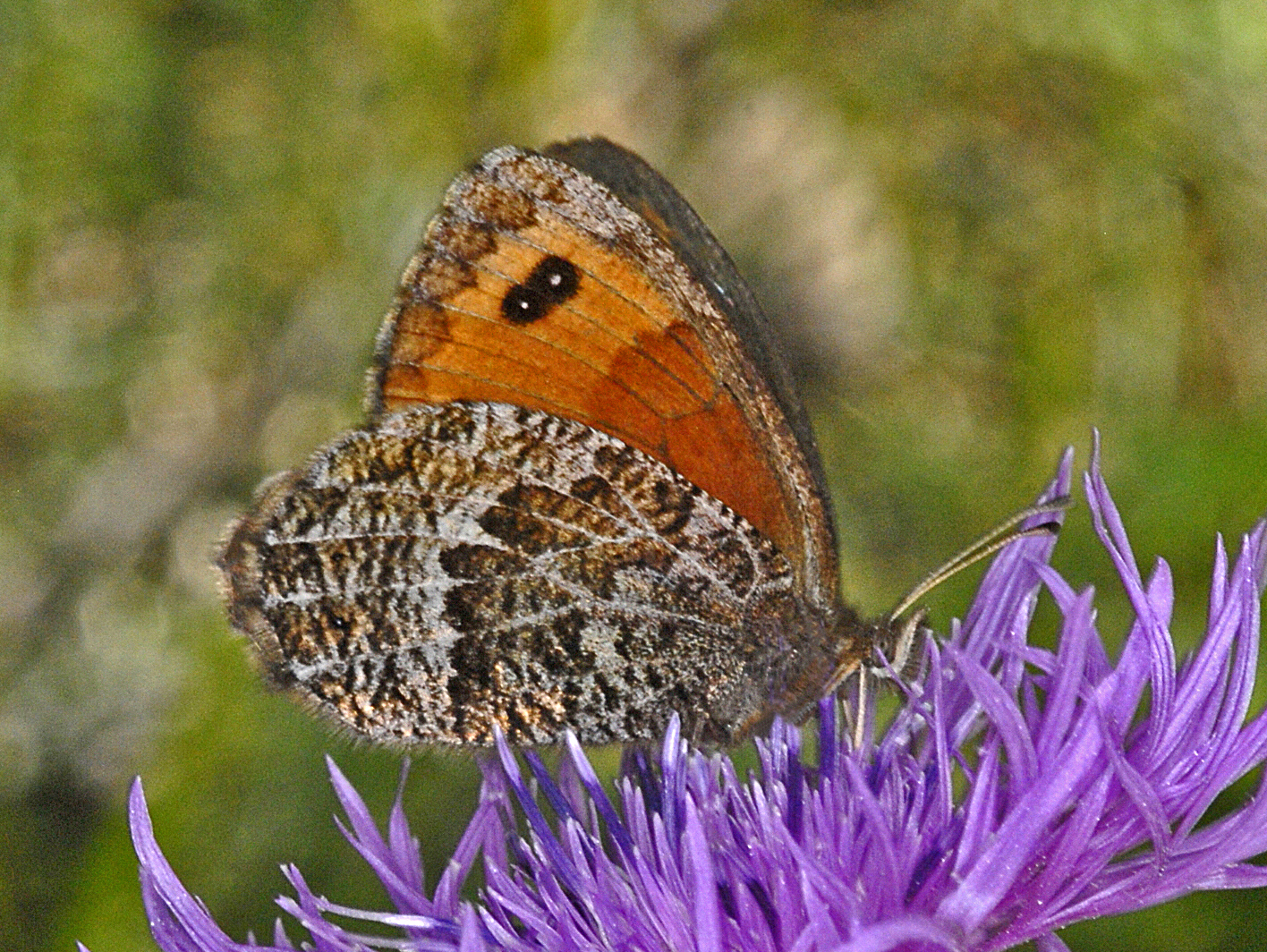
- Underside

Scientific classification
- Domain: Eukaryota
- Kingdom: Animalia
- Phylum: Arthropoda
- Class: Insecta
- Order: Lepidoptera
- Family: Nymphalidae
- Genus: Erebia
- Species: E. montana

Binomial name
- Erebia montana De Prunner, 1798)

Synonyms
- List: Erebia montanus (De Prunner, 1798); Papilio scaea Hübner, 1799-1800; Papilio goante Esper, 1804; Erebia homole Fruhstorfer, 1918; Erebia nanna Vorbrodt, 1921; Erebia heinrichi Zobel, 1923; Erebia isabellina Holtz, 1930; Erebia neoridasoides Verity, 1953; Erebia sabulosus Dujardin, 1945

= Marbled ringlet =

Erebia montana

Species of butterfly

The marbled ringlet (Erebia montana) is a member of the subfamily Satyrinae of the family Nymphalidae.

== Distribution and habitat ==
This species is present in Austria, France, Italy, Liechtenstein and Switzerland. These high-mountain butterflies can be found on warm, rocky slopes, woodland clearings and flower-rich grasslands in the Alps from the Ligurian Alps and the French Alps to the Tyrol and the Dolomites, the Apuan Alps and in the northern and middle Apennines, at an elevation of 1,100–2,500 metres (3,600–8,200 ft) above sea level.

== Description ==
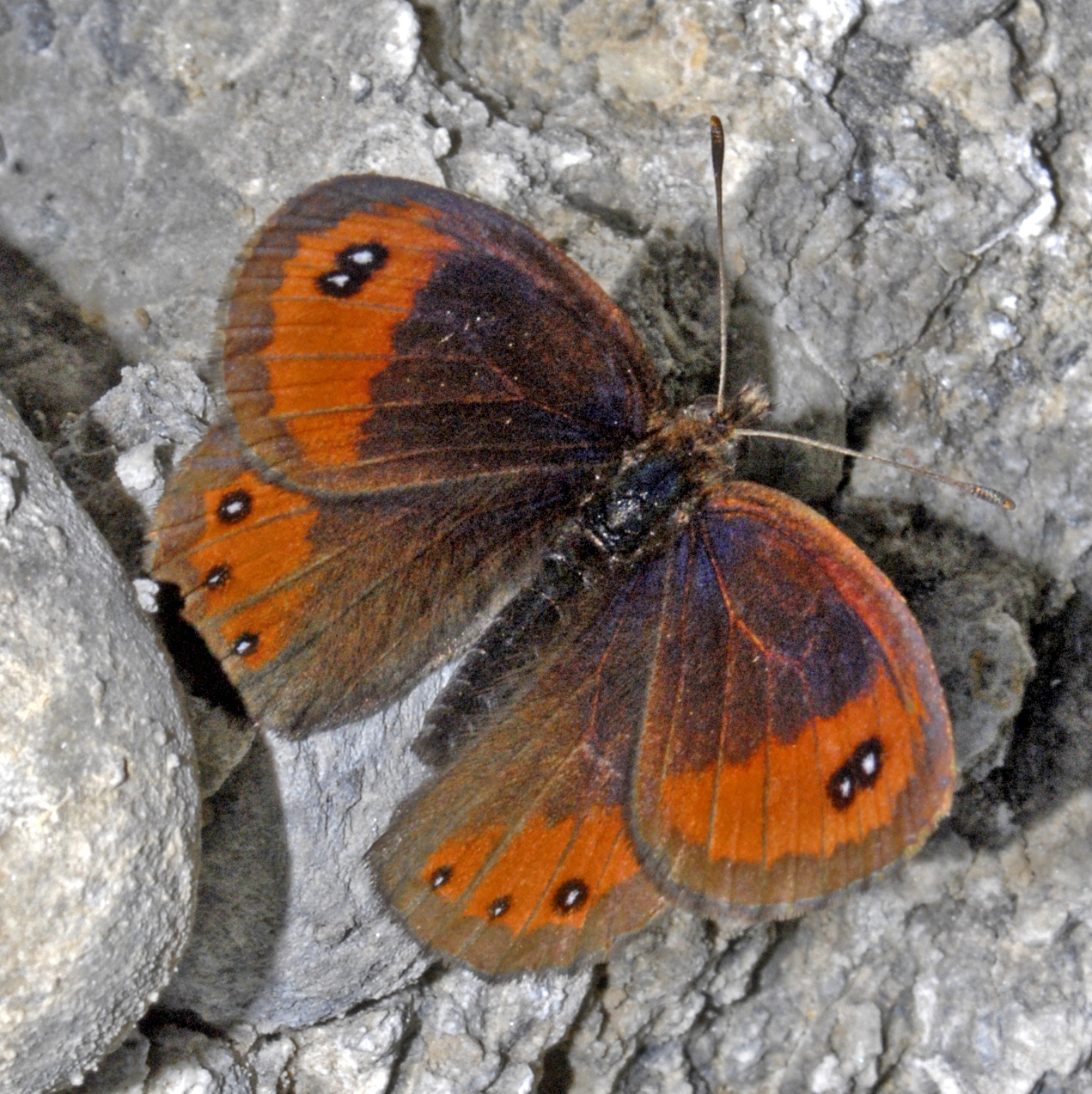

Erebia montana has a wingspan of 44–50 millimetres (1.7–2.0 in). These small dark brown butterflies show a broad bright orange postdiscal band with two oval white pupils at the apex of the forewings and one or two others not very visible, as well as a series of three or four ocelli on the upperside of the hindwings. The underside of the forewings is red brown with two ocelli at the apex and a wavy edge, while the underside of the hindwings is marbled chestnut brown (hence the common name) with well marked whitish veins.

== Description in Seitz ==
E goante Esp (= scaea Hbn.) (37 c). Upperside marked as in nerine, but the ocelli as rule somewhat smaller and the hindwing of the female more distinctly dentate. The band of the forewing narrows posteriorly, being bright russet in the male and light russet-yellow in the female. There are 2 united, white centred, black ocelli near the apex of the forewing, and above them there is sometimes a black ocelliform dot which has but rarely a pupil. Towards the hindmargin there is a further small ocellus, which has occasionally a white centre. In the somewhat narrower distal band of the liindwing there are 3 rarely 4, white-centred black ocelli. The underside of the forewing russet-brown, lighter in the female, with black-brown margin, the apex being dusted with white-grey. Underside of the hindwing black-brown, marmorated with white-grey; the strongly dentate central band is externally bordered by a band-like line which consists of an accumulation of white scales and is here and there interrupted; towards the distal margin there are 3-4 white-centred black eye-dots. The female is throughout lighter in colour, the ocelli being larger. The underside of the hindwing is white-grey, thinly dusted with brown atoms, the veins being sparsely scaled white. The distal margin of the male somewhat lighter than the ground-colour, being chequered brown and white in the female. — In the Alps, in the mountain-and subalpine region, [in the High Tatra and the Carpathian Mts.; in the West Pyrenees as a small form which has been figured by Herrich-Schaeffer as gorgone not included in the distribution as now understood misident. ?]. The butterfly flies in July and August in dry and stony localities, and likes to settle with the wings half open on rocks.

This species is rather similar to Erebia stirius, Erebia styx and Erebia pronoe.

== Biology ==
This species is univoltine. The caterpillars overwinter in the first larval instar. In spring they feed on grasses, mainly Festuca species and Nardus stricta. They pupate in June or July. Adults fly from July to September. They frequently settle on stones or on the ground, but they also visit regularly flowers feeding on nectar.

== Gallery ==
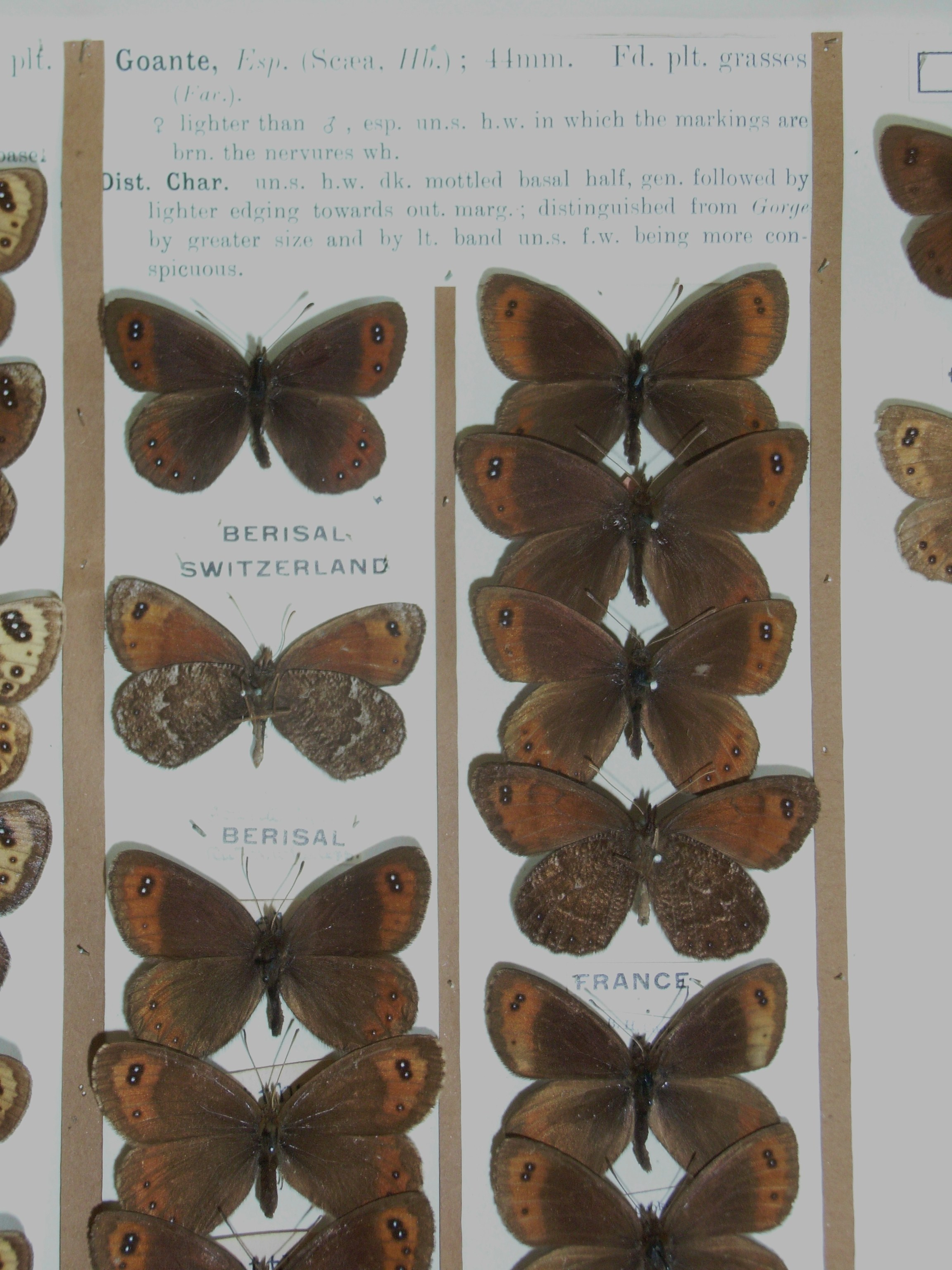
Erebia montana goante (Esper, 1802) - from the Langham and Wheeler collection at the Ulster Museum

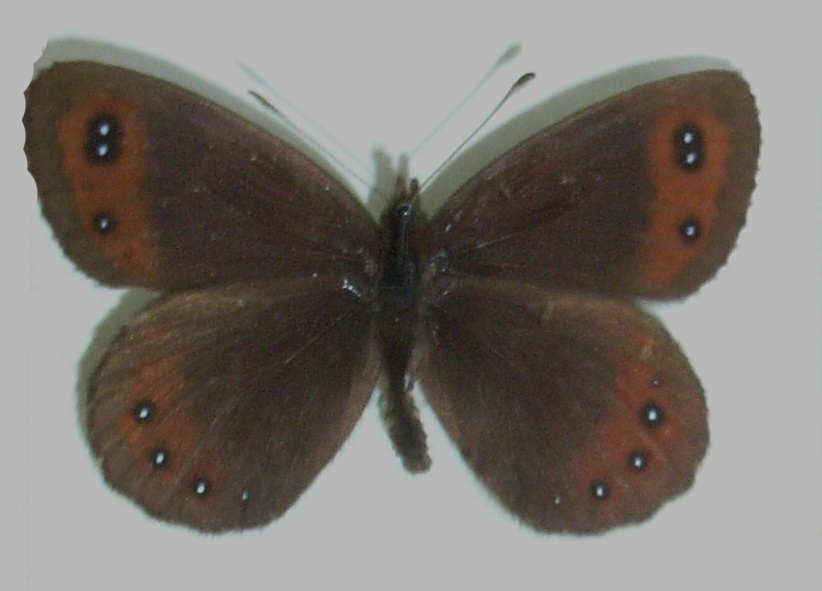
Erebia montana goante

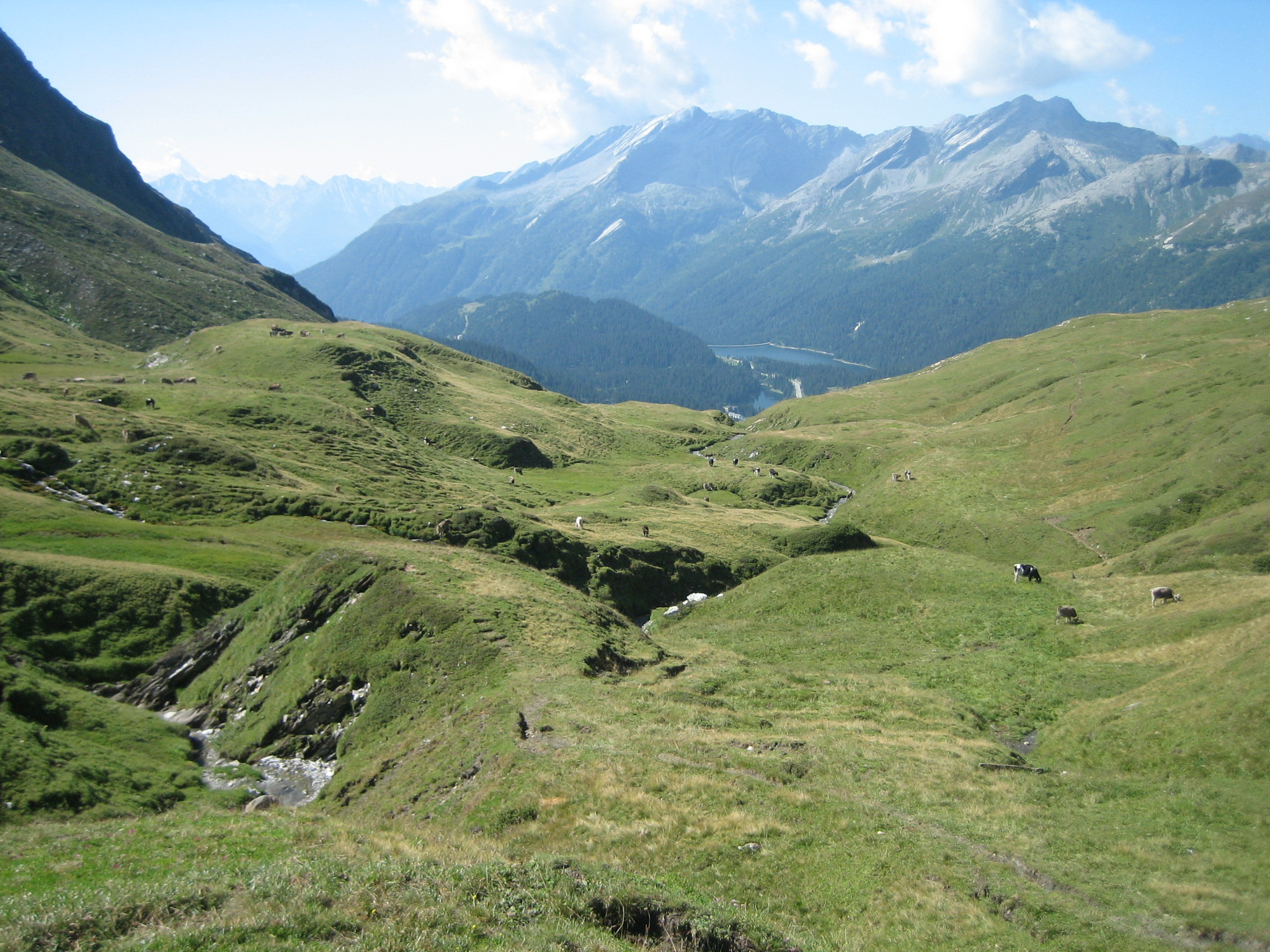
Habitat: montane Festuca grassland at the headwaters of the Moesa in Val Vignun, Switzerland

== Bibliography ==
- Guide des papillons d'Europe et d'Afrique du Nord de Tom Tolman, Richard Lewington, éditions Delachaux et Niestlé, 1998 - (ISBN 2-603-01114-6)
- Tolman T., Lewington R. Collins Field Guide Butterflies of Britain & Europe — London: Harper Collins Publishers, 1997.— 320 p., 106 col. pl
- van Swaay, C., Wynhoff, I., Verovnik, R., Wiemers, M., López Munguira, M., Maes, D., Sasic, M., Verstrael, T., Warren, M. & Settele, J. 2010. Erebia montana. The IUCN Red List of Threatened Species 2010: e.T173230A6977292.
