= Georg von Schorsch =

Swiss officer and diplomat (c. 1475 – c. 1540)

Governor general of the Valtellina
- In office 1525

Personal details
- Born: c. 1475 Splügen
- Died: c. 1540 Splügen

Georg von Schorsch (c. 1475, Splügen – c. 1540, Splügen) was a Swiss military commander and diplomat from Splügen, member of the Schorsch family.

== Life ==
Schorsch served as landamman of the high jurisdiction of Rheinwald in 1509 and as commissioner at Chiavenna from 1517 to 1519. During the first Musso war, he commanded the troops of the Grey League at the siege and capture of Chiavenna in 1525, and was appointed governor general of the Valtellina the same year. As delegate of the Three Leagues, he sought to conclude a peace treaty with Gian Giacomo Medici in 1531. He was sent by the Grisons as envoy to Archduke Ferdinand of Austria in 1533, who, after becoming emperor, confirmed the family's old letter of nobility in 1556.

== Bibliography ==
- E. von Georgii-Georgenau, Biographisch-Genealogische Blätter aus und über Schwaben, 1879.
