= Schorsch family =

Swiss family from Splügen

Schorsch
- Current region: Grisons, Switzerland
- Origin: Valchiavenna, Lombardy
- Founded: c. 1325 (first attested)
- Estates: Splügen, Rheinwald
- Dissolution: c. 1832

The Schorsch family was a family from Splügen, whose name is of Italian origin (Giorgio) and who probably came from the Valchiavenna in Lombardy to settle in the Rheinwald. The family is attested there as early as around 1325 with Georg, mentioned as ammann.

== History ==
From the 16th century onward, the Schorsch held important offices in the Grey League and the Three Leagues, serving as mistrals and envoys. In the 18th century they were also active in the administration of the subject lands of the Grisons, producing two governors general (including Georg von Schorsch), two vicars, four commissioners, and nine podestàs in the Valtellina, as well as two bailiffs at Maienfeld.

In line with the political and commercial interests of the Rheinwald region, they sided with the Spanish (Habsburgs), while also remaining open to overtures from France. They often pursued careers in foreign service, as captains in the Swiss Guards in France at the beginning of the 17th century, in Spanish service at the end of the century, and in Dutch service from the early 18th century. The family branched into several lines from 1600 onward. Some members of the family became burghers of Safien and Chur. The family died out around 1832.

== Bibliography ==
- G. Eisenring, "Die Schorsch von Splügen", in Bündner Monatsblatt, 1942, pp. 285–286.
- P. E. Grimm, Die Anfänge der Bündner Aristokratie im 15. und 16. Jahrhundert, 1981, p. 203.
