= Val Vignun =

Valley in Switzerland

Coordinates: 46°29′49″N 9°13′23″E

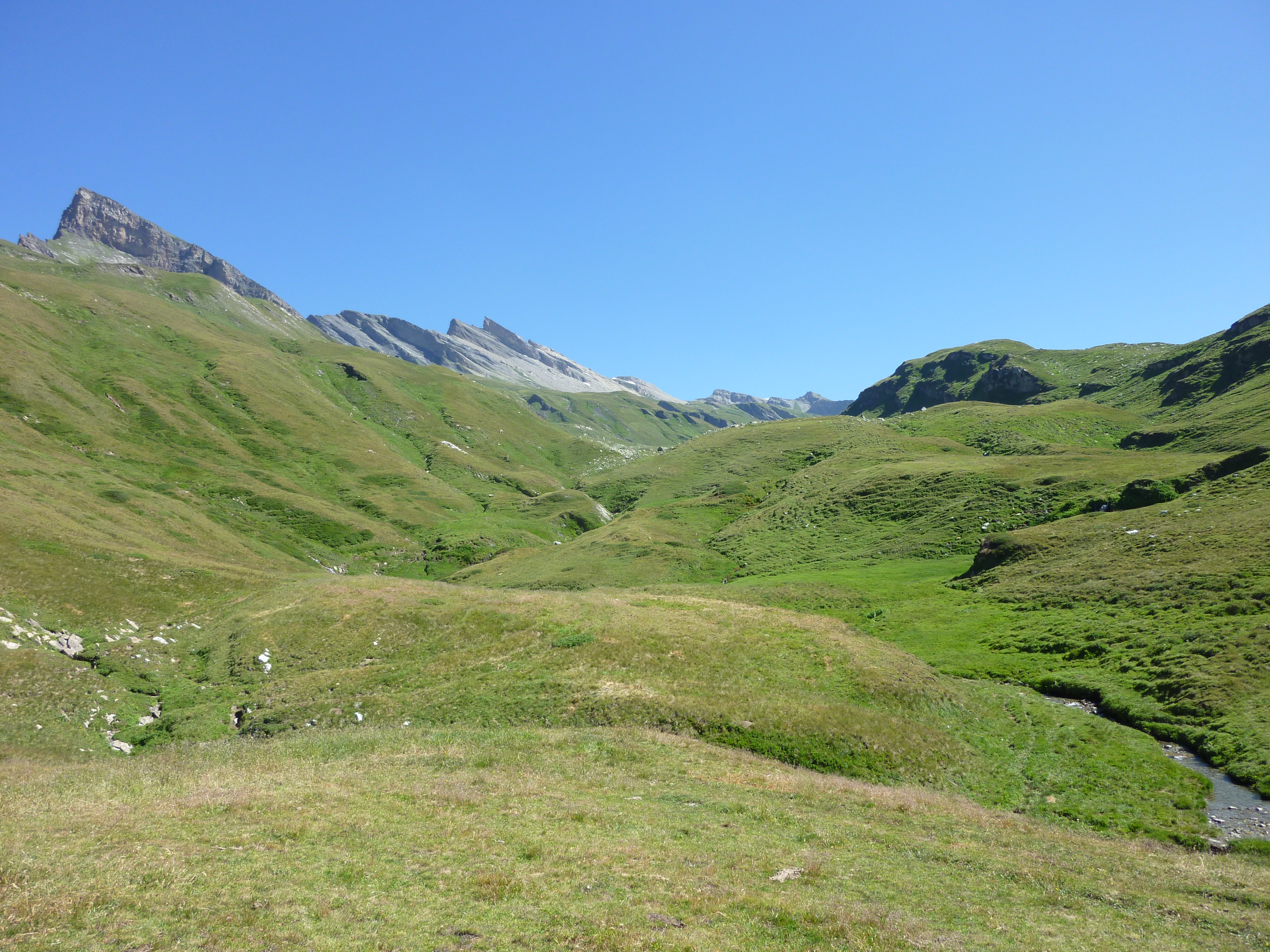
Val Vignun, looking northeast

The Val Vignun is an alpine valley in the Swiss Canton of Graubünden. It also forms a connection between the Misox valley and the Rheinwald valley, parallel to the San Bernardino Pass.

Val Vignun stretches in a northeasterly direction from San Bernardino towards the Val Curciusa, which is a side valley of the Rheinwald. It is about 5 kilometers long and is drained by the Ri de Fontanalba, which flows into the Moesa near San Bernardino.

A well-marked trail leads from the village of San Bernardino in several stages to the Alpine hut Cassina de Vignun (2'115 m), where the real Alpine valley begins. The valley rises evenly to the pass of Strec de Vignun (2'373 m), where it connects to the Val Curciusa. The European Watershed runs across the Strec de Vignun pass.

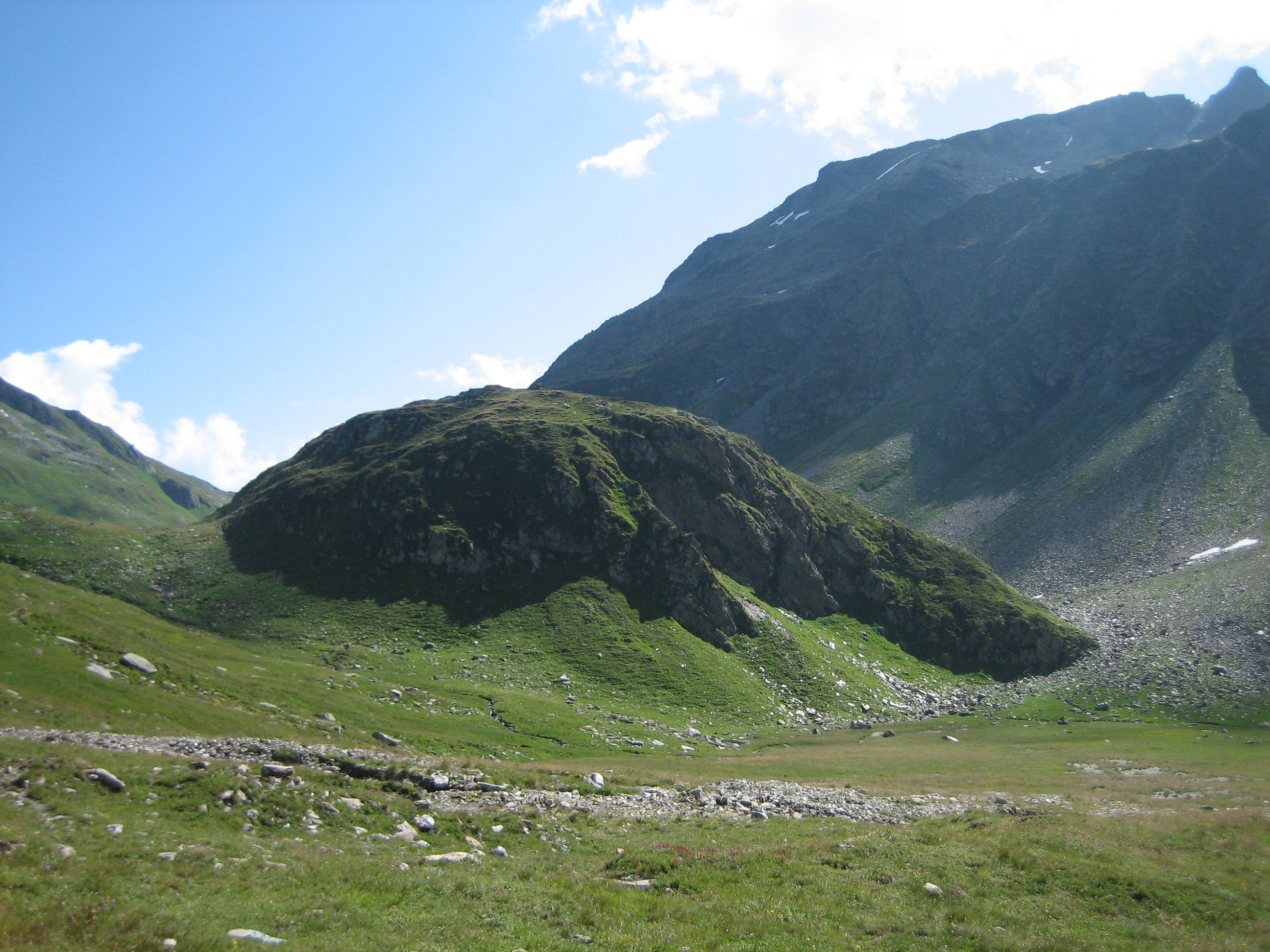
Motta Caslasc

The mighty rock Motta Caslasc rises to a height of 2300 m in the middle of the valley, between two alluvial plains. The rocky knoll has dimensions of approximately 100 by 60 meters. At the northern and southern edges of the plateau, terraces are found that were probably artificially created. A feudal castle can be ruled out, on the grounds of the high altitude. Perhaps this was high-altitude settlement from an indefinite period, used for defense or escape. Remains of walls have not been identified.

The Piz Uccello lies north of the valley and can be reached using a marked mountain path. To the south lies the Piz de la Lumbreida. Apart from several alpine huts, and possibly the Motta Caslasc, the valley has not been developed. Because of its exceptional beauty, the area of the San Bernardino Pass and Val Vignun as a landscape is considered of national importance.

== Gallery ==
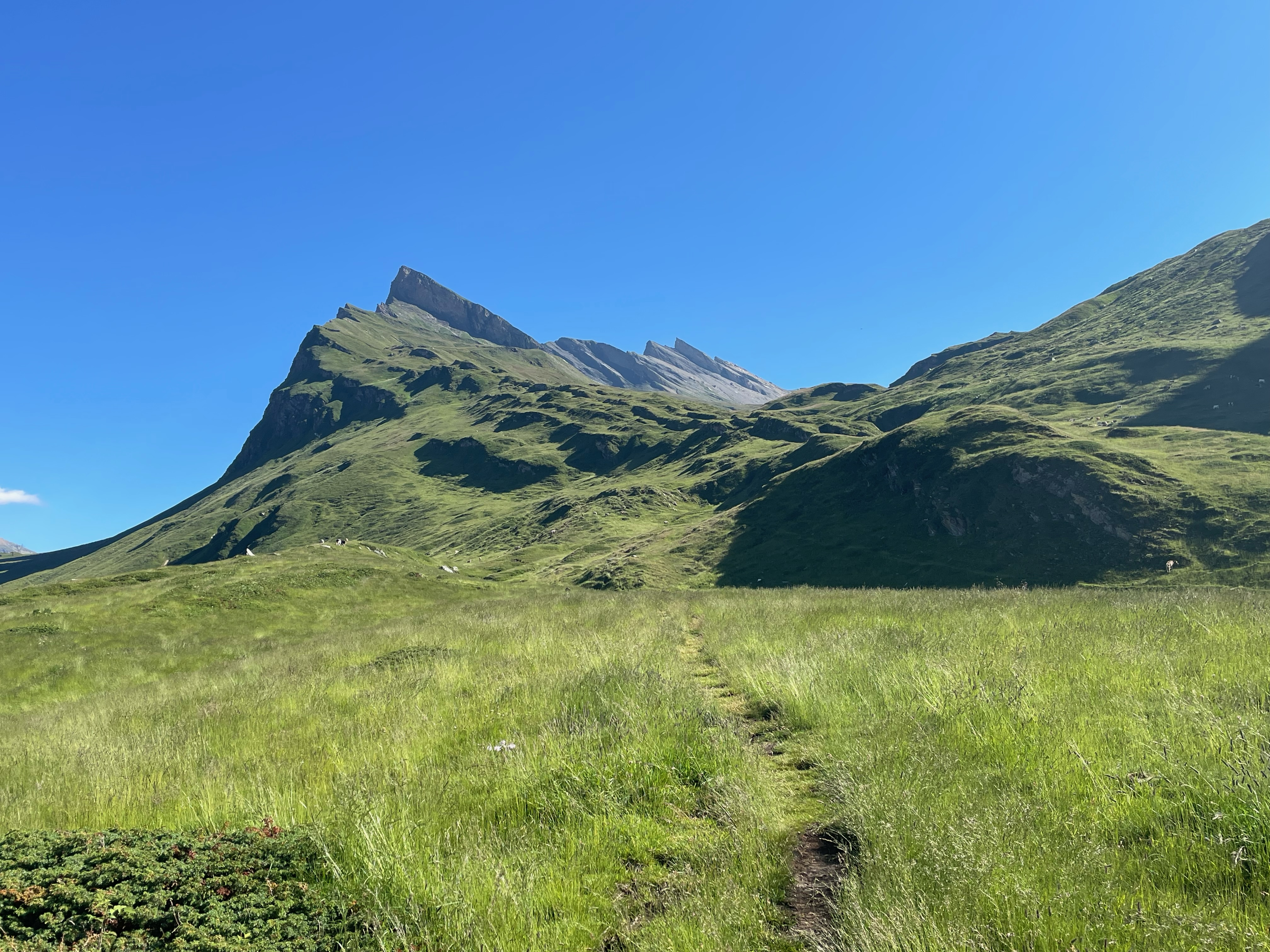
Path ascending into the Val Vignun, on the left the Piz Uccello

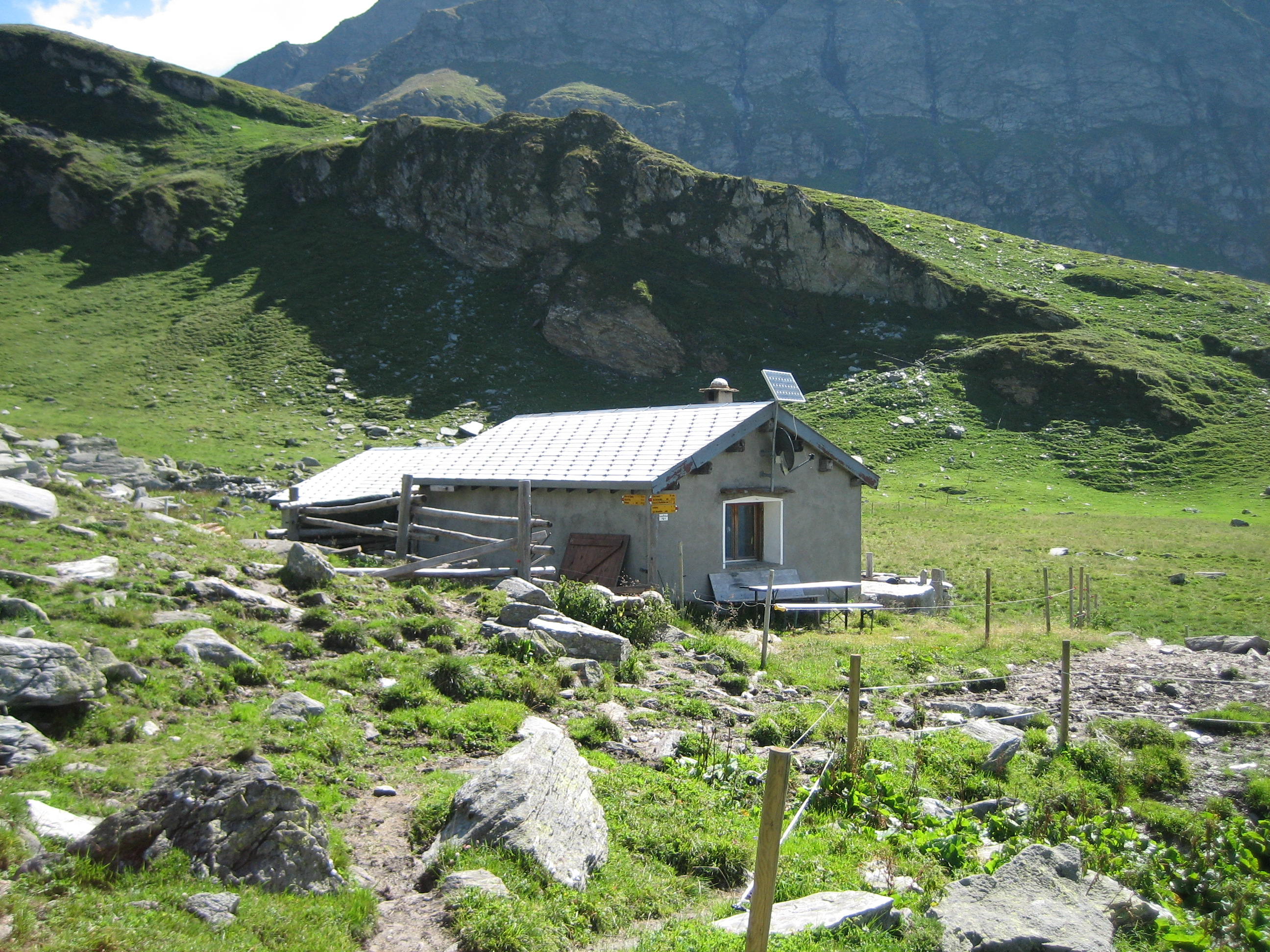
Cassina de Vignun

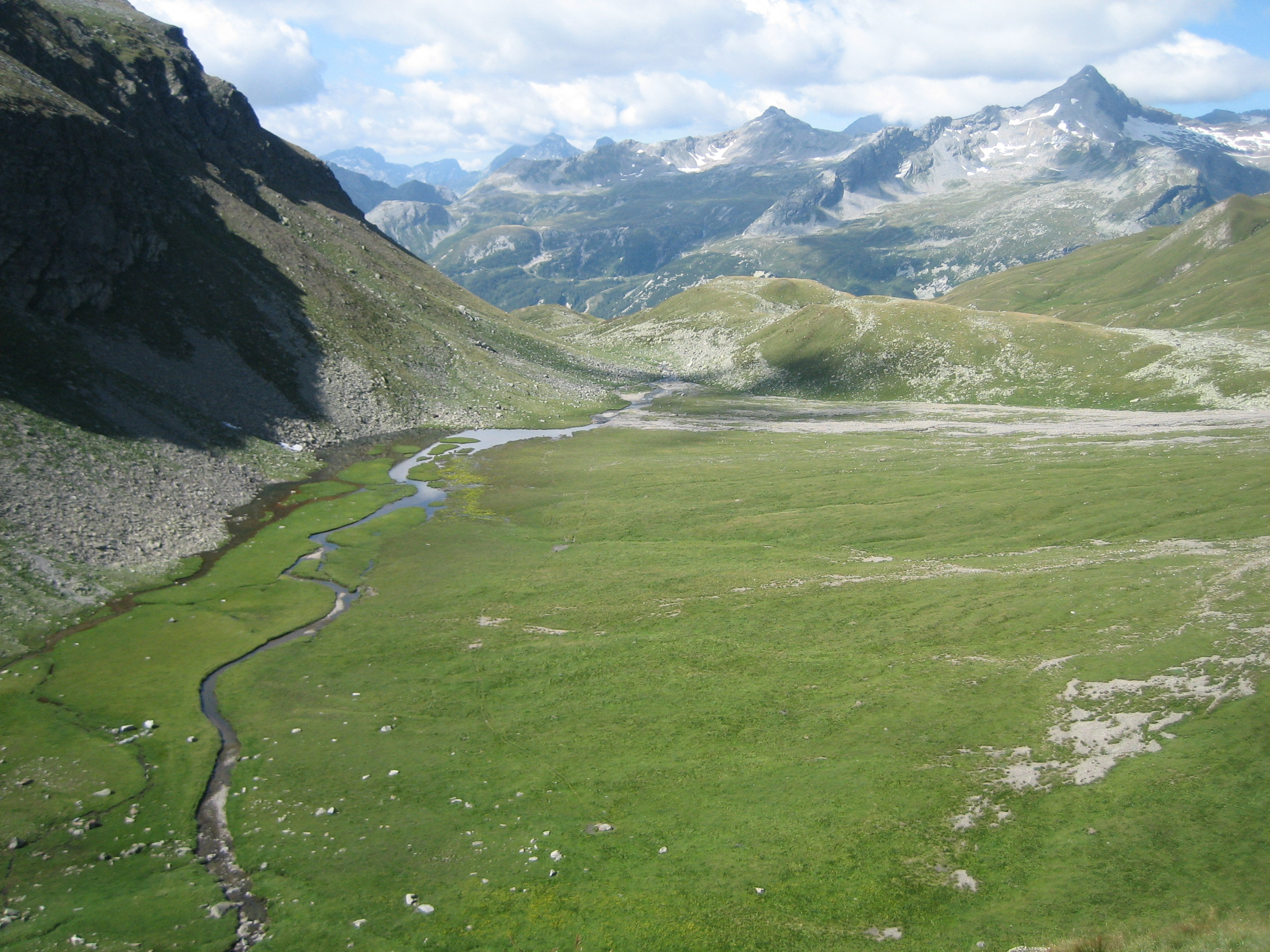
Pian Grand

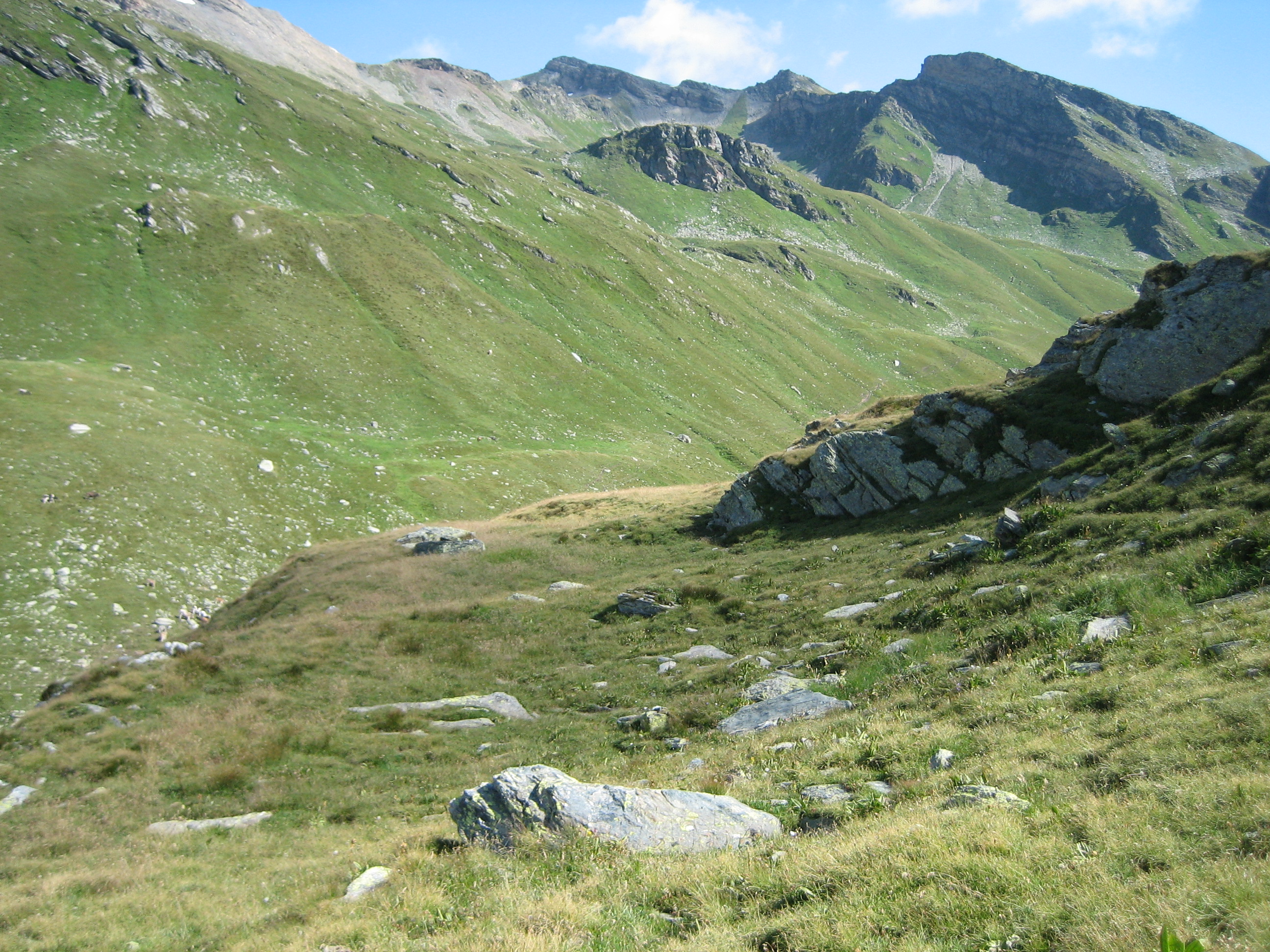
Terrace on the Motta Caslasc

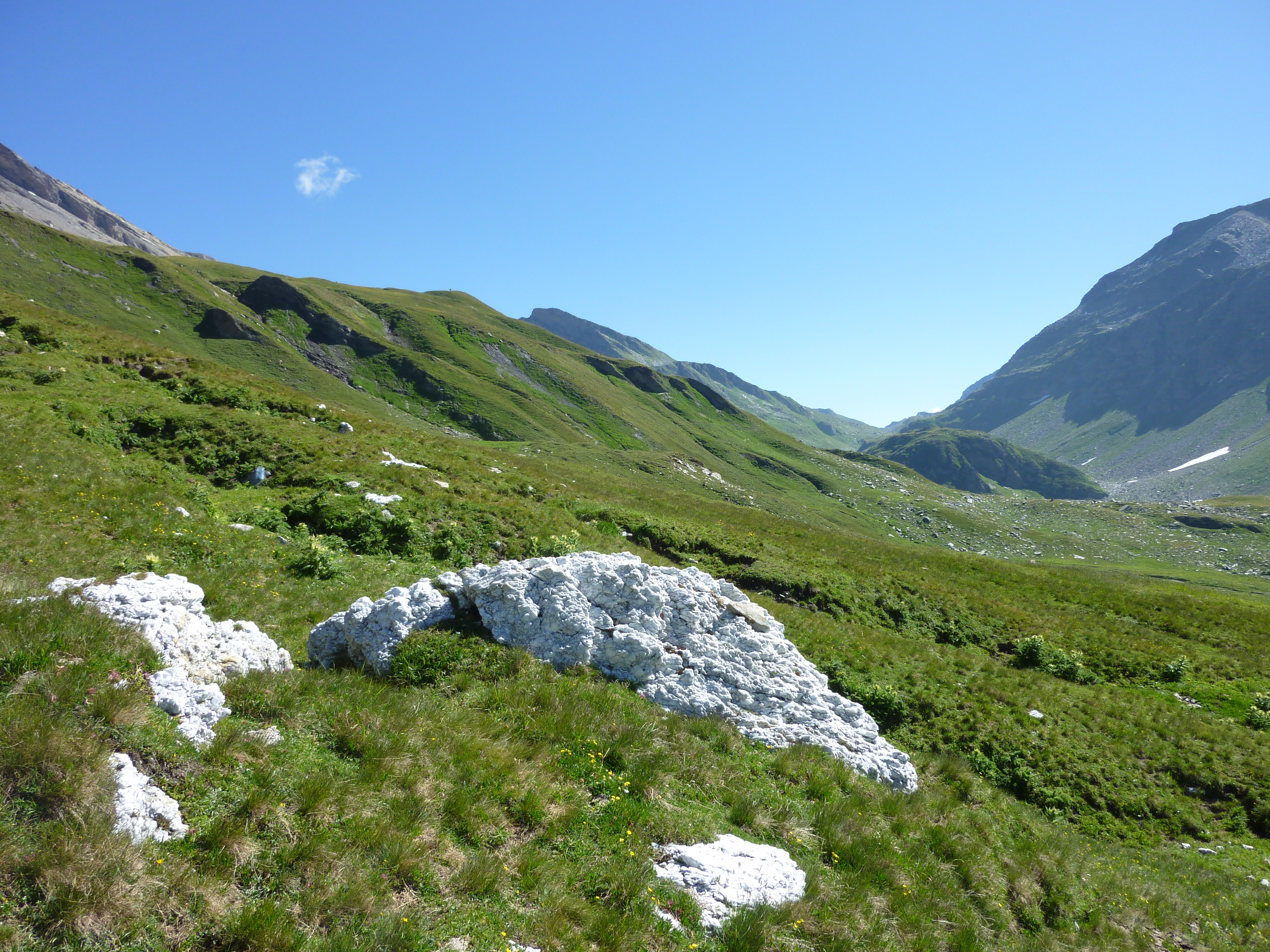
Marble block

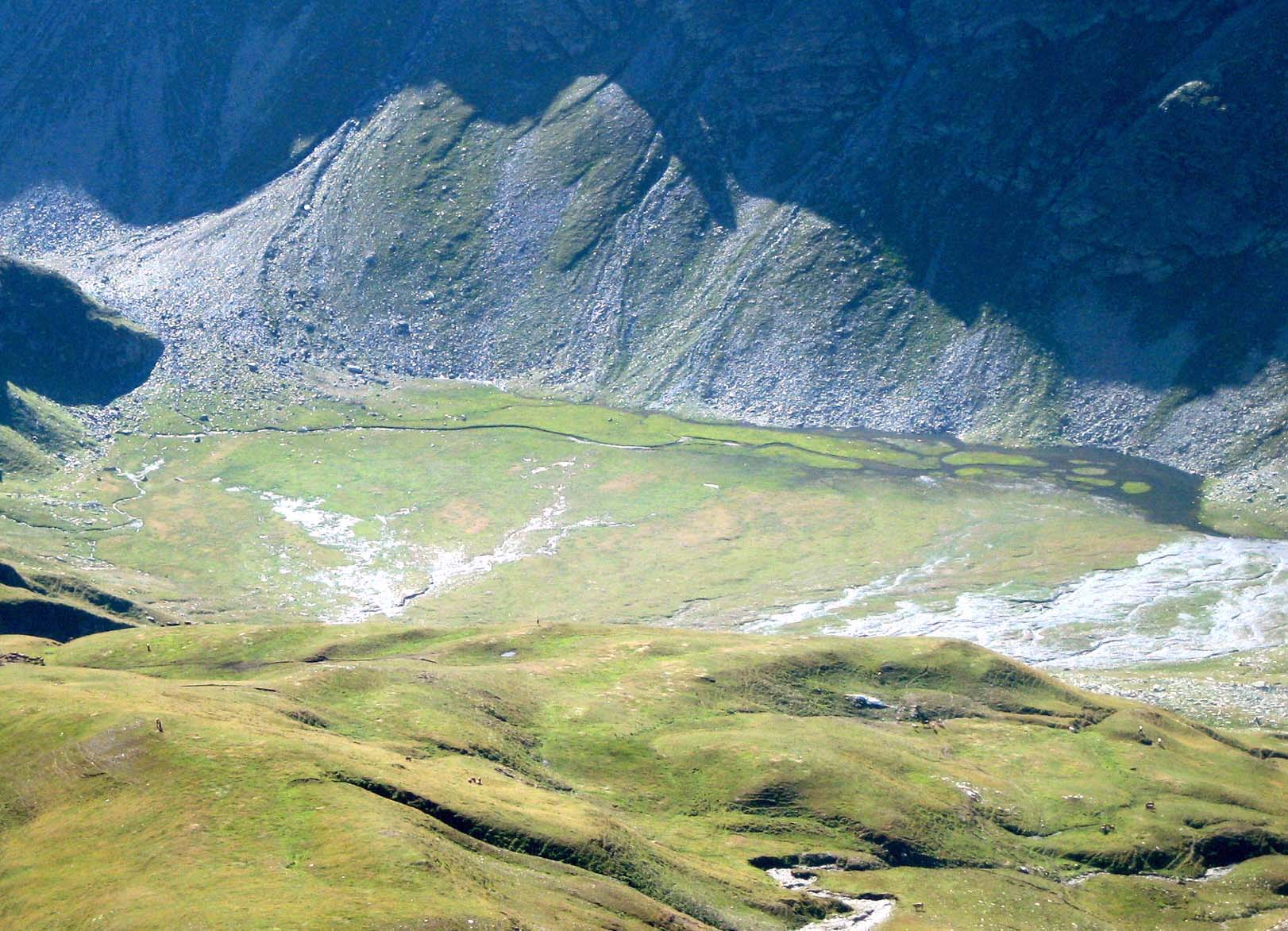
Origin of the Ri Fontanalba
