= Val Curciusa =

Valley in Switzerland

Coordinates: 46.5052°N 9.25992°E

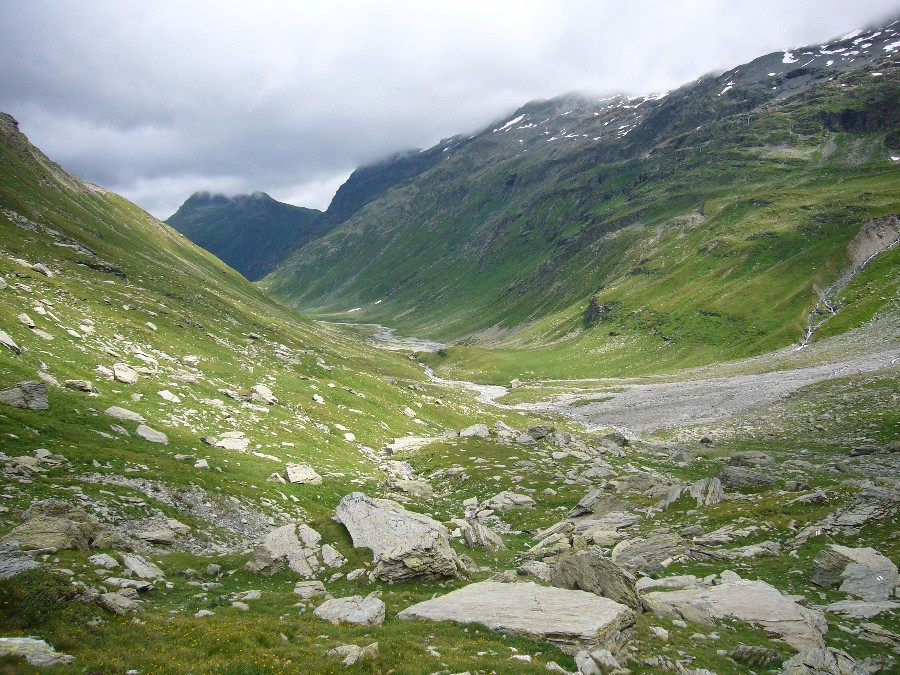
Curciusa Alta seen from the South (looking out of the valley)

The Val Curciusa is an alpine valley in Graubünden, Switzerland. In the region of the San Bernardino Pass, it provides a connection between the Rheinwald valley and the Misox valley.

== Location ==
Val Curciusa leads south from Nufenen in the direction of the Misox valley, ending at the Bocchetta di Curciusa, a mountain pass, which is visible directly from San Bernardino when looking southeast. The valley is about 9 km long and is drained by the Areua Brook, which flows into the Hinterrhein at Nufenen.

Although the valley drains to the north part, about 85 percent of the area, until about 2 km from the confluence of the Areua Brook and the Posterior Rhine, belongs to the municipality of Mesocco south of the watershed.

== Access ==
Although the valley opens out in the German-speaking Hinterrhein valley at Nufenen, the inhabitants speak Italian, which is why the valley has an Italian name. A marked trail leads from the village of San Bernardino in a steep climb via Bocchetta di Curciusa pass (2,419 m), into Curciusa Alta, the upper part of the valley. In this area, the trail is hardly visible. The European Watershed runs across the Bocchetta di Curciusa.

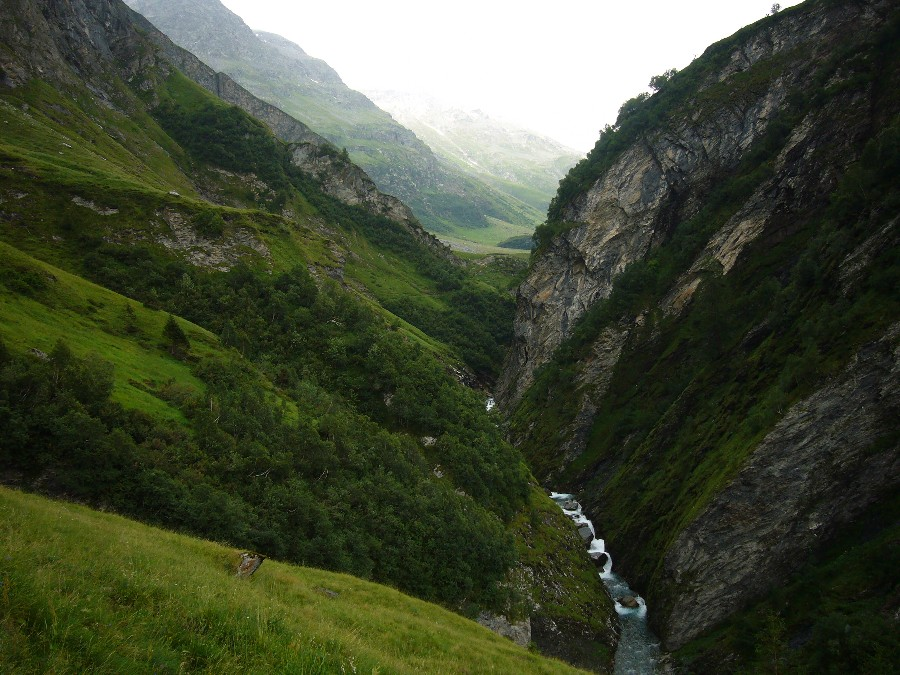
Northern end of the Val Curciusa, looking south, into the valley. Only this part of the valley belongs to the municipality of Hinterrhein

The Curciusa Alta gained national notoriety through a Pump Reservoir Project, which was withdrawn in 1999 for "economic reasons" shortly before a federal court was to decide on an application for environmental protection.

Val Curciusa is one of the few valleys in Switzerland, in which there is neither a reservoir nor an access road. It is only accessible on foot and surprises with a Wild West atmosphere on the second-highest part of the valley, the Curciusa Bassa, where not only cattle but also horses are allowed to graze in summer. In the highest part of the valley, the Curciusa Alta, the side valley Val Rossa branches off to the west.

The section below Curciusa Bassa is calle Alpe di Rog. Here, a trail branches off to the east, across Areua pass into Italy. Another trail branches off to the west, into Val Vignun.

The highest peaks on the eastern side of the valley are the Pizzo Tambo, to south of the Areua Pass and the Guggernüll, to the north of the Pass. The highest peaks on the western side, are the Piz de la Lumbreida, to the south of the trail into Val Vignun and the Einshorn north of that trail.

== Gallery ==
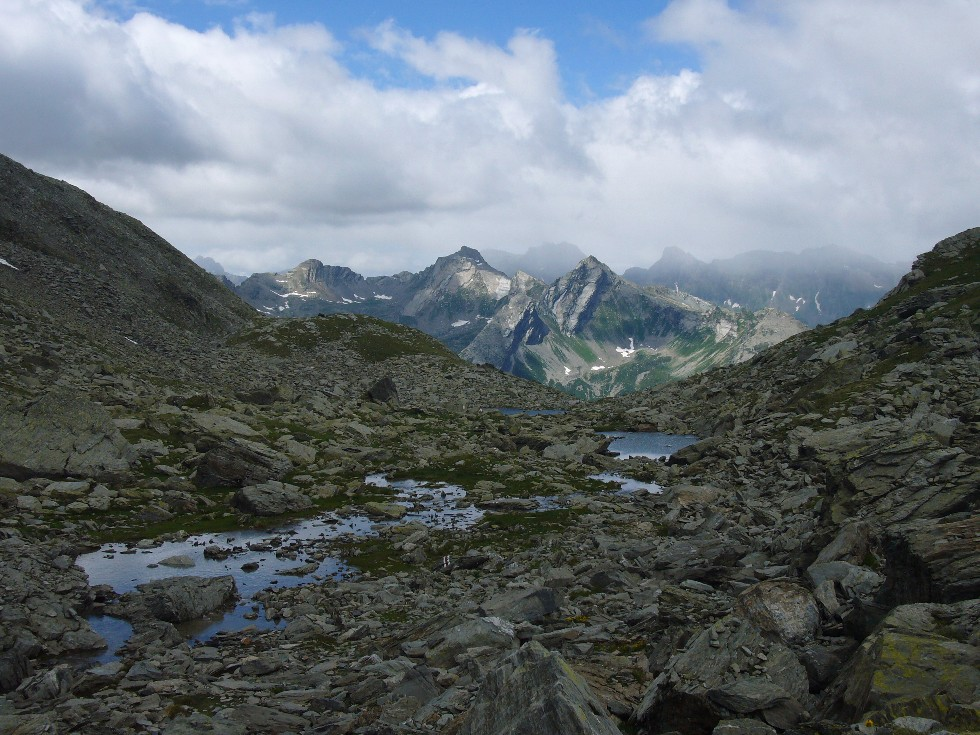
Looking west from Bocchetta di Curciusa; visible are the mountains west of San Bernardino Pass, including Piz Pian Grand.

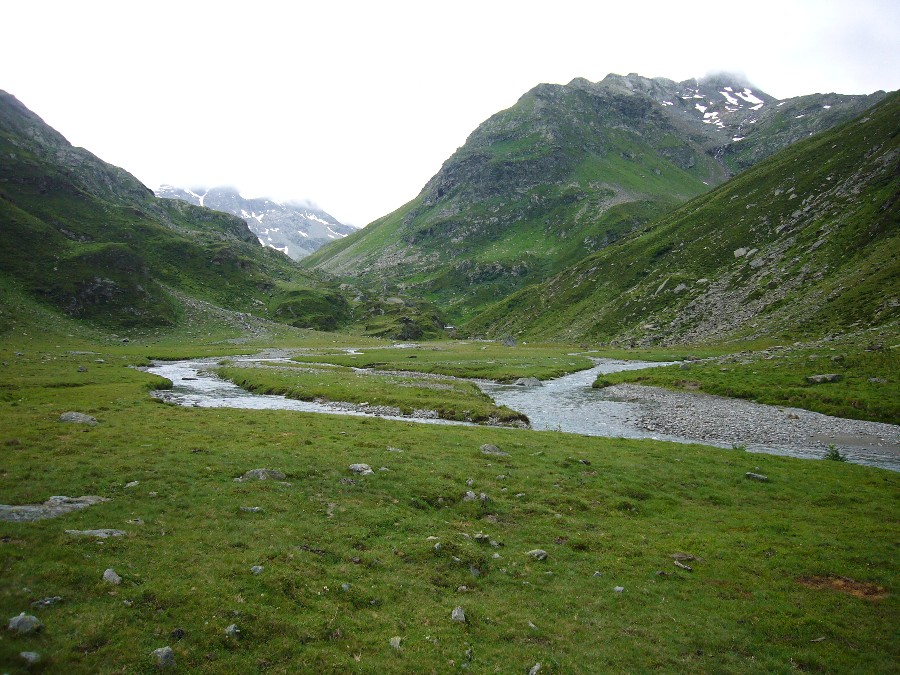
Curciusa Bassa looking south; in the background on the left the Curciusa Alta, on the right Val Rossa

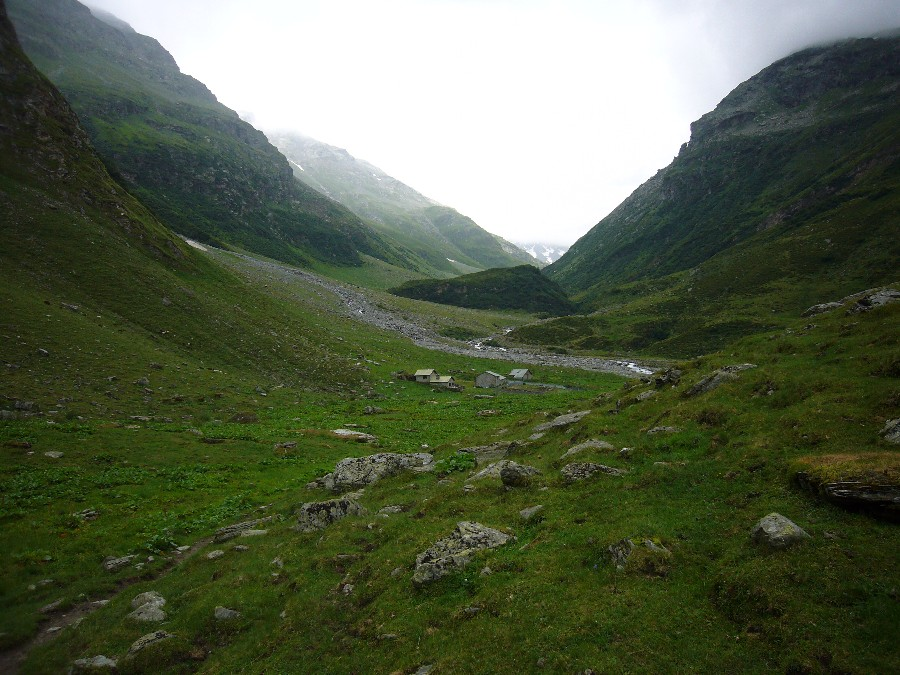
Alpe di Rog looking South

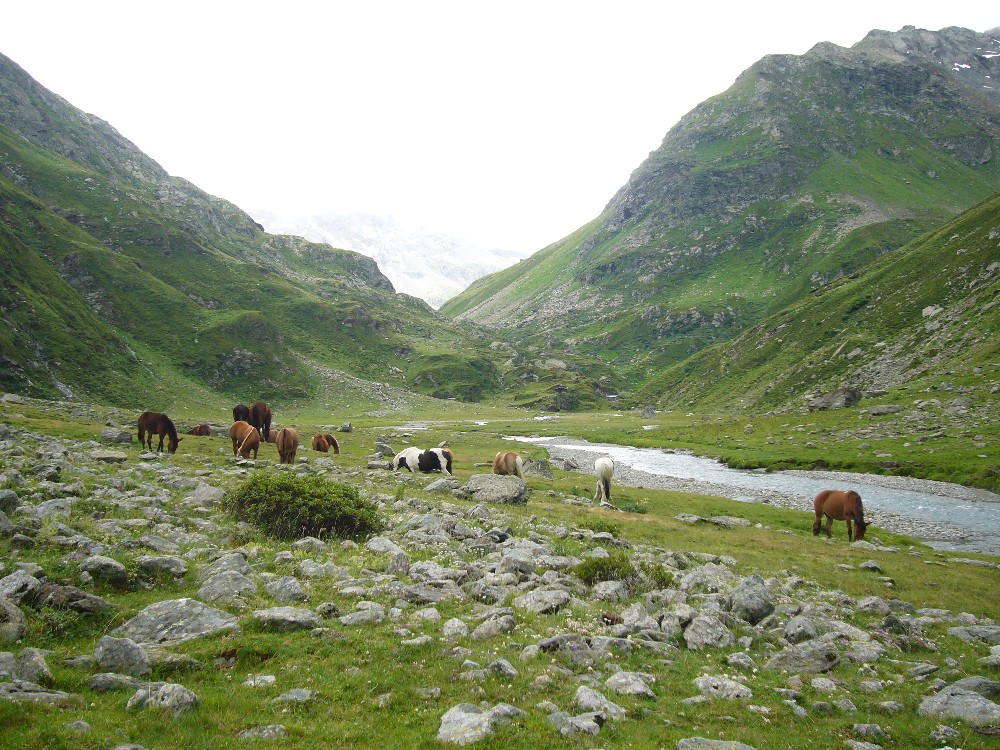
Curciusa Bassa

== References and sources ==
- Tip Tour San Bernardino Pass Hiking (PDF), The Alps, vol. 9, SAC, 2009, pp. 15–17
