= Piz Uccello =

Mountain of the Swiss Alps

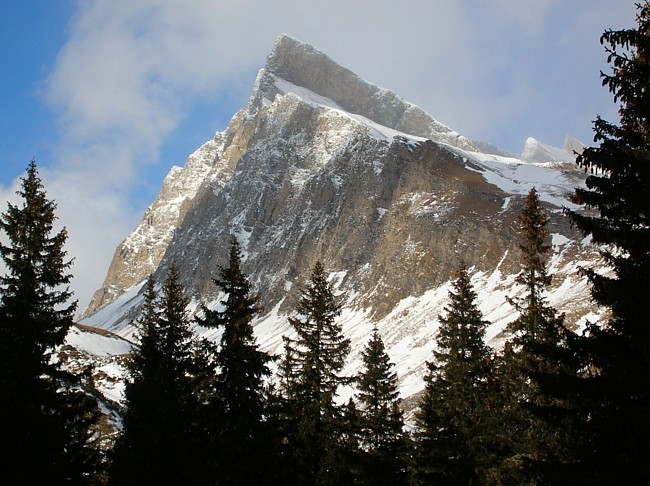
- View from San Bernardino (south side)

Highest point
- Elevation: 2,724 m (8,937 ft)
- Prominence: 46 m (151 ft)
- Parent peak: Einshorn
- Listing: Mountains of Switzerland
- Coordinates: 46°29′59.1″N 9°11′58.3″E

Geography
- Location within Switzerland
- Location: Graubünden, Switzerland
- Parent range: Lepontine Alps

Piz Uccello is a mountain of the Swiss Lepontine Alps, overlooking the San Bernardino Pass in the canton of Graubünden. It lies on the range culminating at the Einshorn.
