= Einshorn =

Mountain in Switzerland

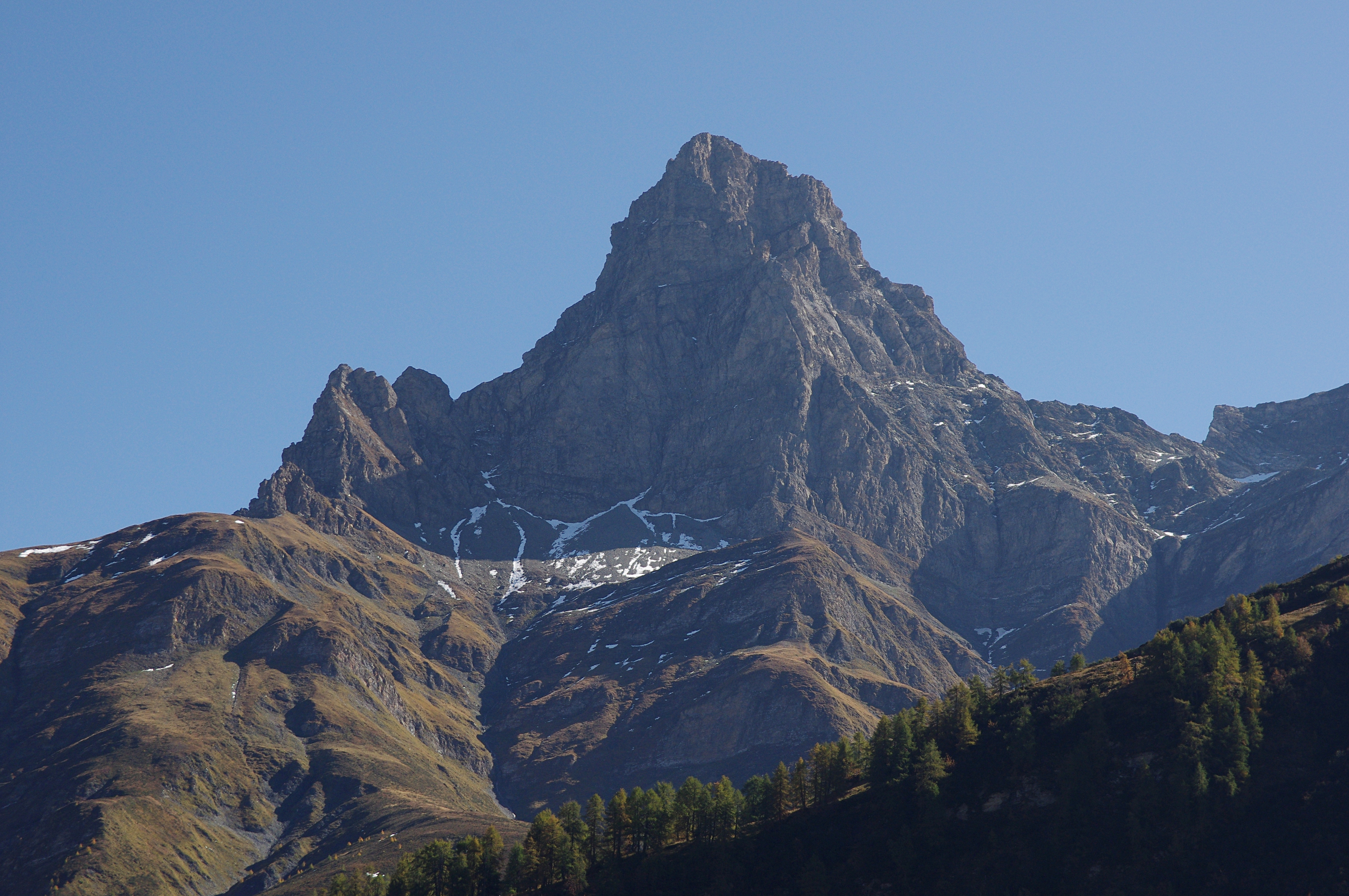
- Einshorn seen from Hinterrhein

Highest point
- Elevation: 2,944 m (9,659 ft)
- Prominence: 571 m (1,873 ft)
- Parent peak: Pizzo Tambo
- Coordinates: 46°30′58″N 9°13′49.1″E

Geography
- Location within Switzerland
- Location: Graubünden, Switzerland
- Parent range: Lepontine Alps

The Einshorn is a mountain of the Lepontine Alps, overlooking Hinterrhein in the Swiss canton of Graubünden.

The peak can be seen from the Swiss A13 motorway. It looks very much like Pizzo Ucello that can be seen from the southern entrance into the San Bernardino tunnel (which made a year-round opening of the road possible from 1967), and many people think that they saw the same mountain twice - before and after the tunnel. They actually form a ridge together but only one each can be seen from each side.

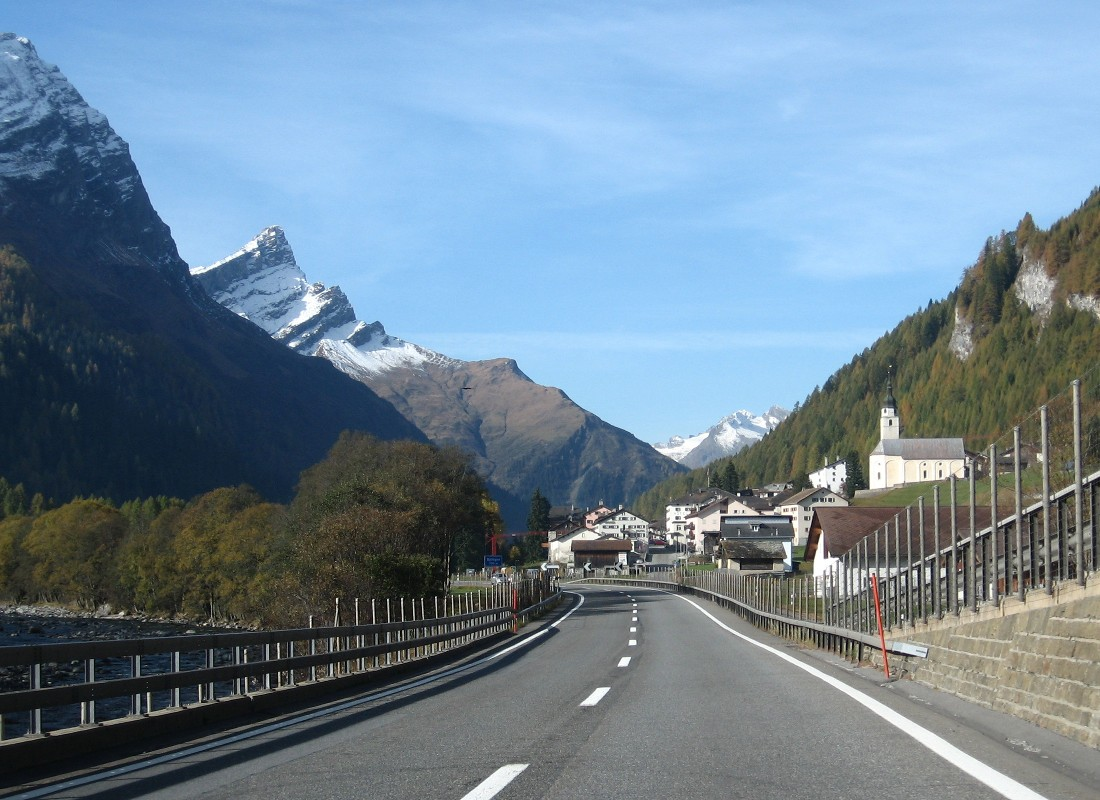
Einshorn seen from the A13 Expressway past the alps at Splügen

Before the construction of the tunnel, both passes from Splügen, the Splügen Pass and the San Bernardino Pass passing under Einshorn were similarly important but nowadays only one of them, San Bernardino, is open during winter. In ancient times, Splügen Pass was the more important connection. Thanks to its lack of importance it is now a quiet pass where essential portions of the historical roads and paths have survived allowing a good historical review for hikers on Via Spluga.

Parallel to the Splügen Pass route and directly under Einshorn lies Val Curciusa, a very remote valley compared to most alpine valleys as there is no road into it and besides some huts for grazing animals no traces from this highly industrialized and densely populated country.

The peak can be reached from the south on a Swiss grade T5, which demands experience in mountain hiking.
