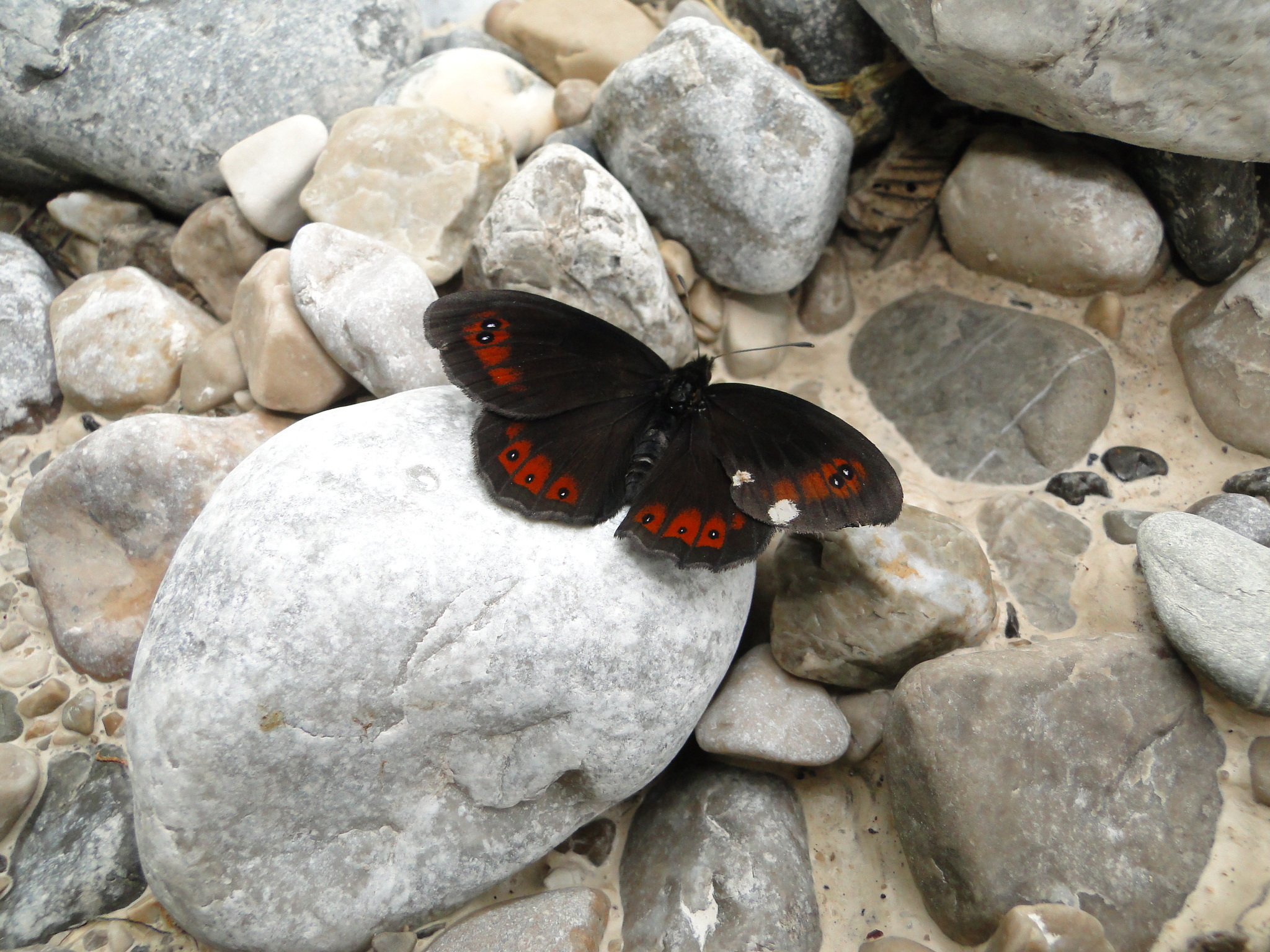

Conservation status
- Least Concern (IUCN 3.1)

Scientific classification
- Kingdom: Animalia
- Phylum: Arthropoda
- Class: Insecta
- Order: Lepidoptera
- Family: Nymphalidae
- Genus: Erebia
- Species: E. styx

Binomial name
- Erebia styx (Freyer, 1834)

Synonyms
- Erebia reichlini Herrich-Schäffer, 1860; Hipparchia styx Freyer, 1834

= Stygian ringlet =

Species of butterfly

The Stygian ringlet (Erebia styx) is a butterfly belonging to the subfamily Satyrinae, the "browns", within the family Nymphalidae. It is found locally in the Alps on dry limestone slopes. It is very similar to the Styrian ringlet (E. stirius) and has sometimes been included in that species.

== Description ==
It has a wingspan of 46–56 mm. The upperwings of both sexes are mostly brown with reddish bands near the edge (postdiscal bands). The bands vary in size and may be dusted with brown in the males. Within the bands are a variable number of eyespots (ocelli); these are black with white centres. The forewing has a large eyespot near the tip, often with two white centres. The hindwing has three or four spots.

The underside of the male's forewing is largely orange with brown dusting in the basal half and a brown border. Unlike in the Styrian ringlet, the brown border does not taper towards the rear of the wing and has a dark "tooth" projecting into the orange The tooth is less conspicuous in the females. The underside of the hindwing is mostly brownish, darker in the basal half.

The subspecies E. s. triglites of the Bergamo Alps and Monte Generoso is more strongly marked than the nominate subspecies E. s. styx. It has a larger postdiscal band and larger eyespots on the upper forewing while the underside of the hindwing sometimes lacks eyespots.

The subspecies E. s. trentae of the Julian Alps is even more strongly marked. It has large eyespots with bright white centres.

== Distribution and habitat ==
It occurs in the Alps at altitudes of 600–2,200 metres. It is found in northern Italy from near Monte Generoso to the Dolomites, in Ticino canton in south-east Switzerland, in the Allgäu Alps in south-east Germany, in parts of Austria and in the Julian Alps in Slovenia. It inhabits steep limestone slopes with scattered trees and bushes. It favours warm, dry, rocky areas.

== Life cycle ==
The barrel-shaped eggs are grey-brown with brown spots and prominent ribs. The caterpillars are grey-brown with lighter and darker stripes and can reach 20–25 mm in length. They feed on grasses, particularly Sesleria varia. They take up to two years to mature, hibernating during the first and penultimate instars. The butterfly pupates among stones and grass in a green and brown chrysalis. The adults fly from early July until early September. A single brood is produced each year.

== Etymology ==
Named in the Classical tradition.Styx was the name of an Oceanid nymph, one of the three thousand daughters of the Titans Oceanus and his sister-wife Tethys, and the goddess of the River Styx. Others make her one of the progenies of the primordial gods, Nyx (Night) and Erebus (Darkness)
