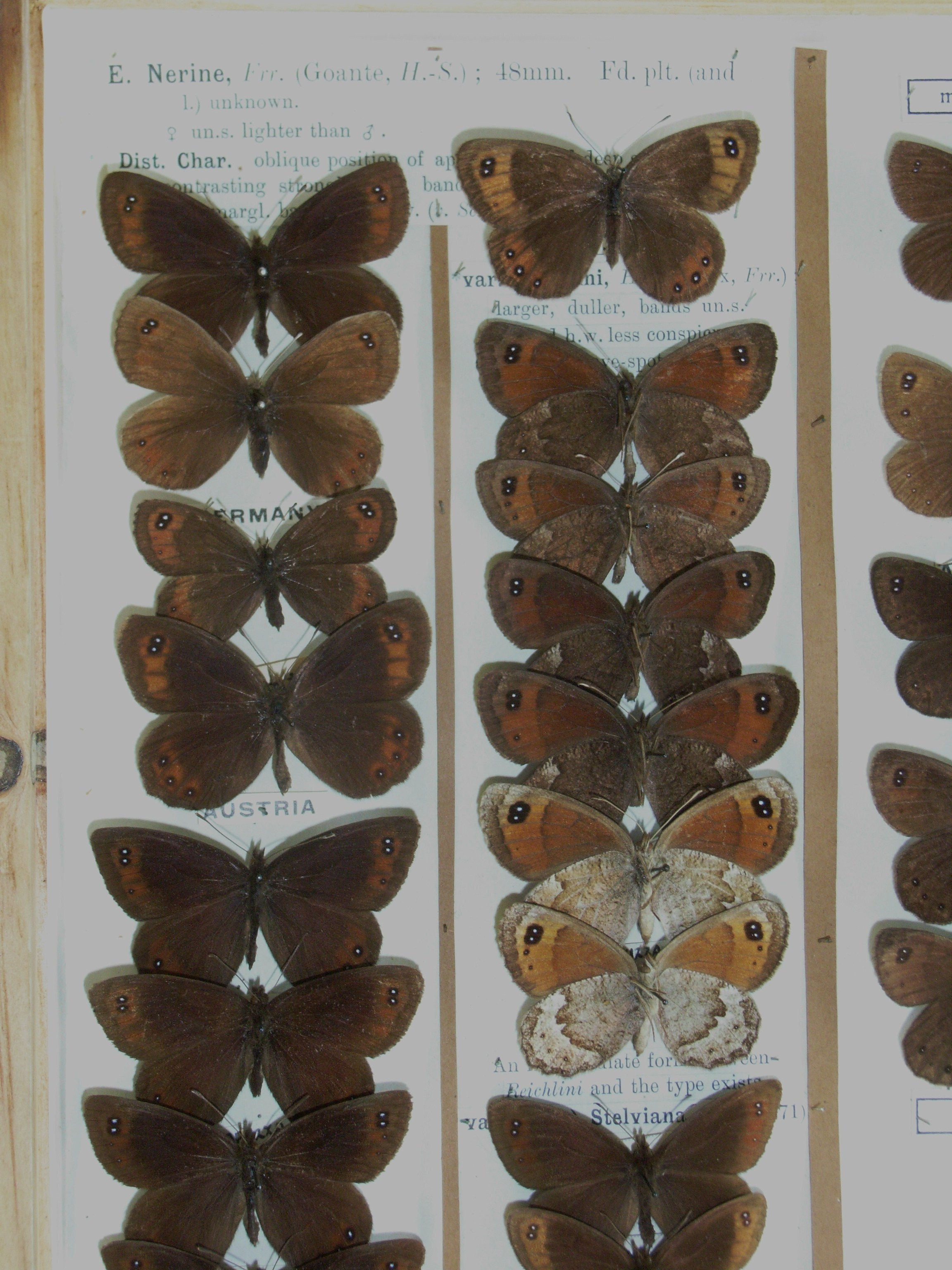
- Langham and Wheeler collection - Ulster Museum

Scientific classification
- Kingdom: Animalia
- Phylum: Arthropoda
- Clade: Pancrustacea
- Class: Insecta
- Order: Lepidoptera
- Family: Nymphalidae
- Genus: Erebia
- Species: E. stirius

Binomial name
- Erebia stirius (Godart, [1824])

Synonyms
- Erebia nerine Freyer, 1831; Erebia styrius (Godart, [1824]) (lapsus)

= Styrian ringlet =

Species of butterfly

The Styrian ringlet (Erebia stirius, often misspelled "styrius") is a member of the subfamily Satyrinae of the family Nymphalidae. It is a mountain butterfly found in the Austrian and Italian Alps, Croatia and Slovenia.

== Description in Seitz ==
E. nerine Frr. (= goante H Schaff (37 a, b). The upperside dark black-brown with slight gloss. The red-brown transverse band of the forewing is posteriorly interrupted by the veins, forming 3—4 basally somewhat pointed spots; sometimes the band is continuous, which is nearly always the case in the male. There are 2 white-centred black ocelli anteriorly in the band. The band is interrupted by the veins on the hindwing and bears 3 smaller ocelli. The forewing beneath bright russet-red, darker towards the base, the costal and distal margins being black-brown: the ocelli as above. The hindwing beneath dark brown as far as the centre, this area being bordered by a whitish grey narrow band which is somewhat sinuate near its centre; the ocelli in the lighter distal area are mostly indicated by small black-bordered white dots, which are sometimes absent. The ground-colour of the female is lighter, the band of the forewing broader and russet-yellow, the 2 eyes at the apex larger and usually confluent, there being often two additional smaller ocelli towards the hindmargin. The ocelli placed in the band of the hindwing are also larger and have conspicuous white pupils. The forewing beneath is light russet-yellow, darkened towards the base, the costal and distal margins grey-brown, the apex dusted with white-grey The hindwing beneath white grey irrorated with brown atoms; the white-grey band, which limits the dark basal area, contrasts distinctly. The fringes chequered in the female, the distal margin of the hindwing slightly dentate. In the Central and Southern Alps, northward to the Fern Pass and Scharnitz Valley. — reichlini H Schaff (= styx Frr.), from the Bavarian Alps, Reichenhall and the Glockner district, is usually somewhat larger than the first described form. The band of the forewing is strongly reduced. The hindwing with 3 small ocelli in russet red spots. — italica Frey from the Alps of Wallis and North Italy, is a transition from nerine towards reichlini. — In stelviana [now synonym of Erebia pluto Curo, from Bormo, the red band of the forewing is continuous, the underside devoid of ocelli, being paler and basally but indistinctly dusted with white. — morula Esp. from southern slopes of the Eastern Alps, is smaller and darker, the ocelli are but faintly ringed with reddish yellow. Hindwing beneath with the basal half dark brown, the distal area being lighter and bearing 3 white pupils. In South Tirol, Seiser Alp. — nerine flies in various dispersed localities, from the end of June to August in shady places of the forest region up to more than 5000 ft.

Flies from the end of July to the beginning of September. The larvae feed on Sesleria caerulea.

Etymology: Styria is a state in Austria.
