= Rheinwald =

Coordinates: 46.545°N 9.289°E

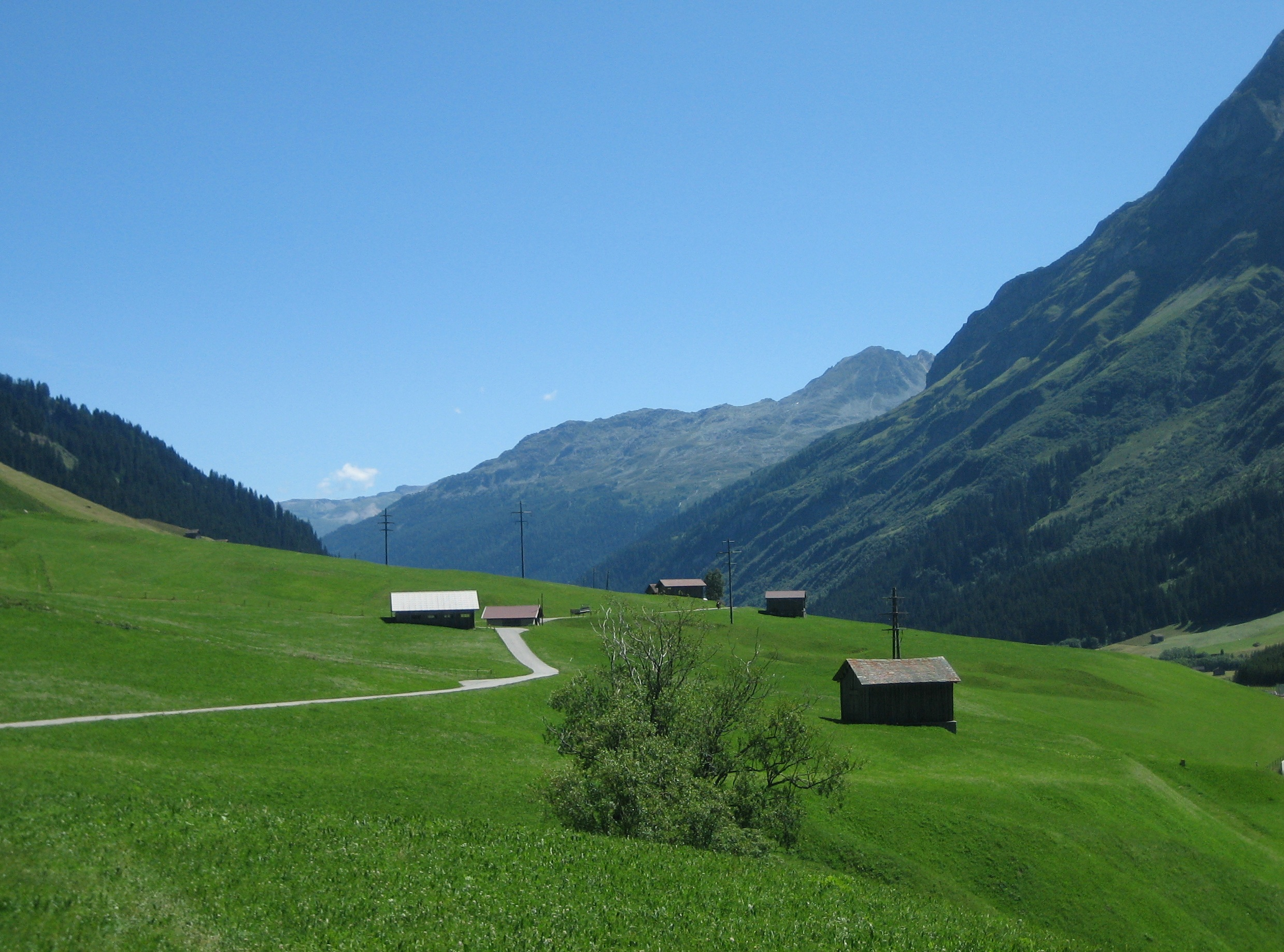
The Rheinwald looking north between Nufenen and Hinterrhein

The Rheinwald (from Latin Rheni vallis meaning "Rhine Valley"; Romansh: Valrain) is a valley in the Canton of Grisons in Switzerland, the first section of the Hinterrhein valley. The river Hinterrhein flows through three valleys in the Grisons, the Rheinwald, the Schams and the Domleschg.

== Geography ==
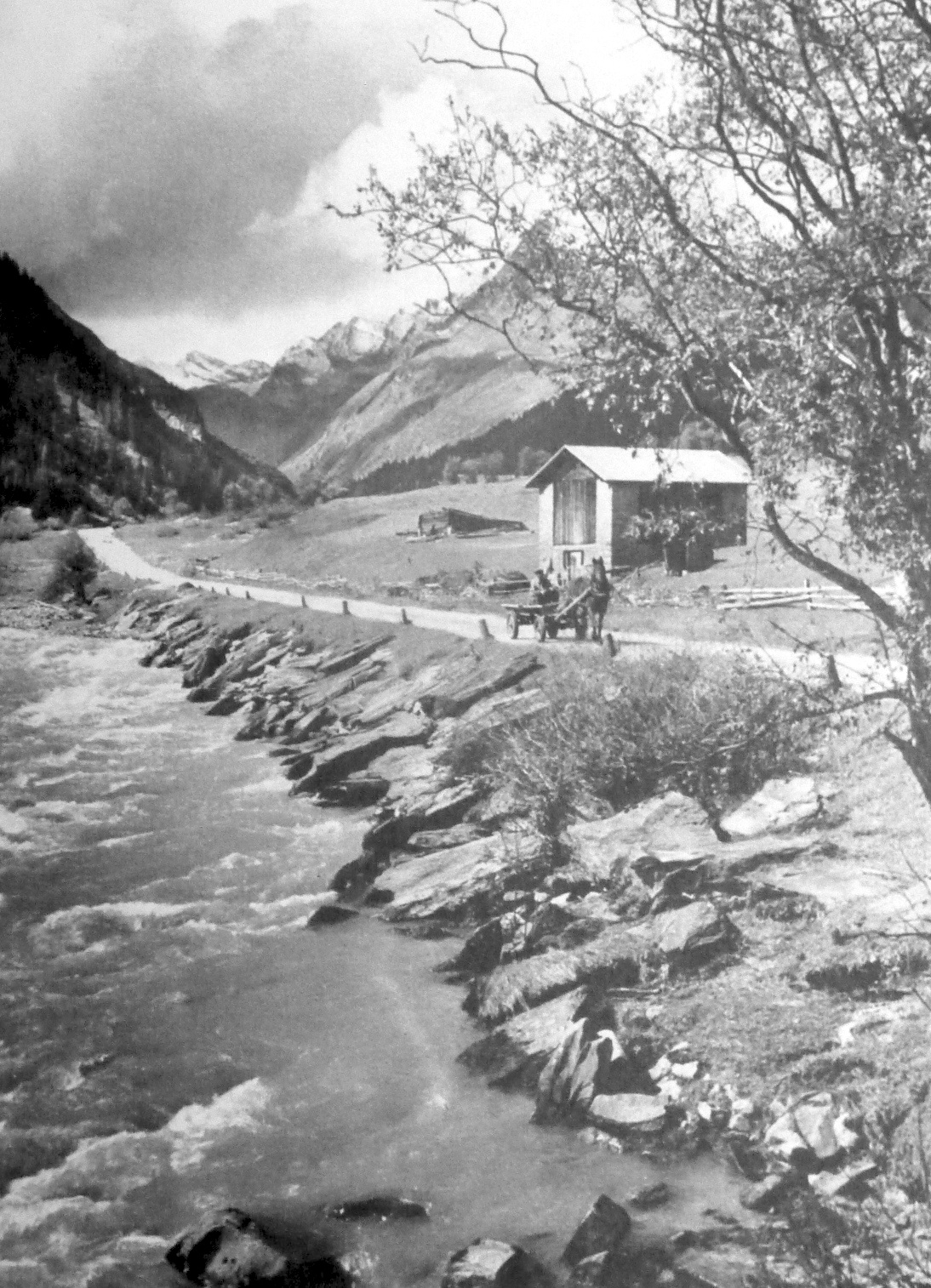
Rheinwald near Splügen, around 1920

Aerial view (1954)

The Rheinwald is about 26 km long and mainly runs from East to West. It is lined on both sides with peaks of over 3000 m high. The highest peaks are the Rheinwaldhorn (3402 m) to the West and the Pizzo Tambo (3279 m) in the South. The Hinterrhein leaves the valley at the entrance to the Rofla Gorge, which separates the Rheinwald from the Schams valley.

Two mountain passes lead South from the Rheinwald: the San Bernardino Pass into Misox valley and the Splügen Pass into Val San Giacomo in Italy. The San Bernardino Tunnel (Swiss Highway A13) was opened in 1967 and stays open all winter. Mule tracks on Mount Safierberg and Mount Valserberg connect the Rheinwald with its Northern neighbour Safien valley and Vals. Another trail leads through the Val Curciusa valley via Bocchetta di Curciusa Pass and then connects to the San Bernardino.

The villages in the valley are all on the Northern bank of the river and between 1420 m and 1620 m high, at the foot of the moderately steep slopes on the sunny side of the valley. The northern slope is covered with many Alpine meadows; the Southern side also has some meadows, separated by several side valleys.

== Municipalities ==
The stars represent the five villages Sufers, Splügen, Medels, Nufenen and Hinterrhein

The economic and cultural center of the valley is Splügen. The Rheinwald Kreis is a sub-district of the Hinterrhein District. It includes the municipalities of Hinterrhein, Nufenen, Splügen and Sufers. The municipality of Val Curciusa belongs orographically to the Rheinwald, but administratively to the district of San Bernardino.

== History ==
The San Bernardino Pass and the route via Splügen have been used since at least the days of the Romans. The Rheinwald valley, however, was sparsely inhabited until well into the High Middle Ages. During the 13th Century, Walser settlers travelled into the valley, at the behest of the Barons of Sax-Misox and the Barons of Vaz. Their language and culture shape the valley today. The 1286 Erblehensbrief ("Letter of enfeoffment") documents the legal relations between the settlers and their ruler.

In 1337, after the death of the last Baron of Vaz, the Rheinwald came was given as a dowry to the counts of Werdenberg-Sargans. They sold it in 1493 to the Trivulzio family of Milan. In 1616, the umbrella contract with the Trivulzio was terminated, and after paying the last interest payment the inhabitants of the Rheinwald obtained full autonomy within the Grey League, to which they had belonged to since around 1400.
