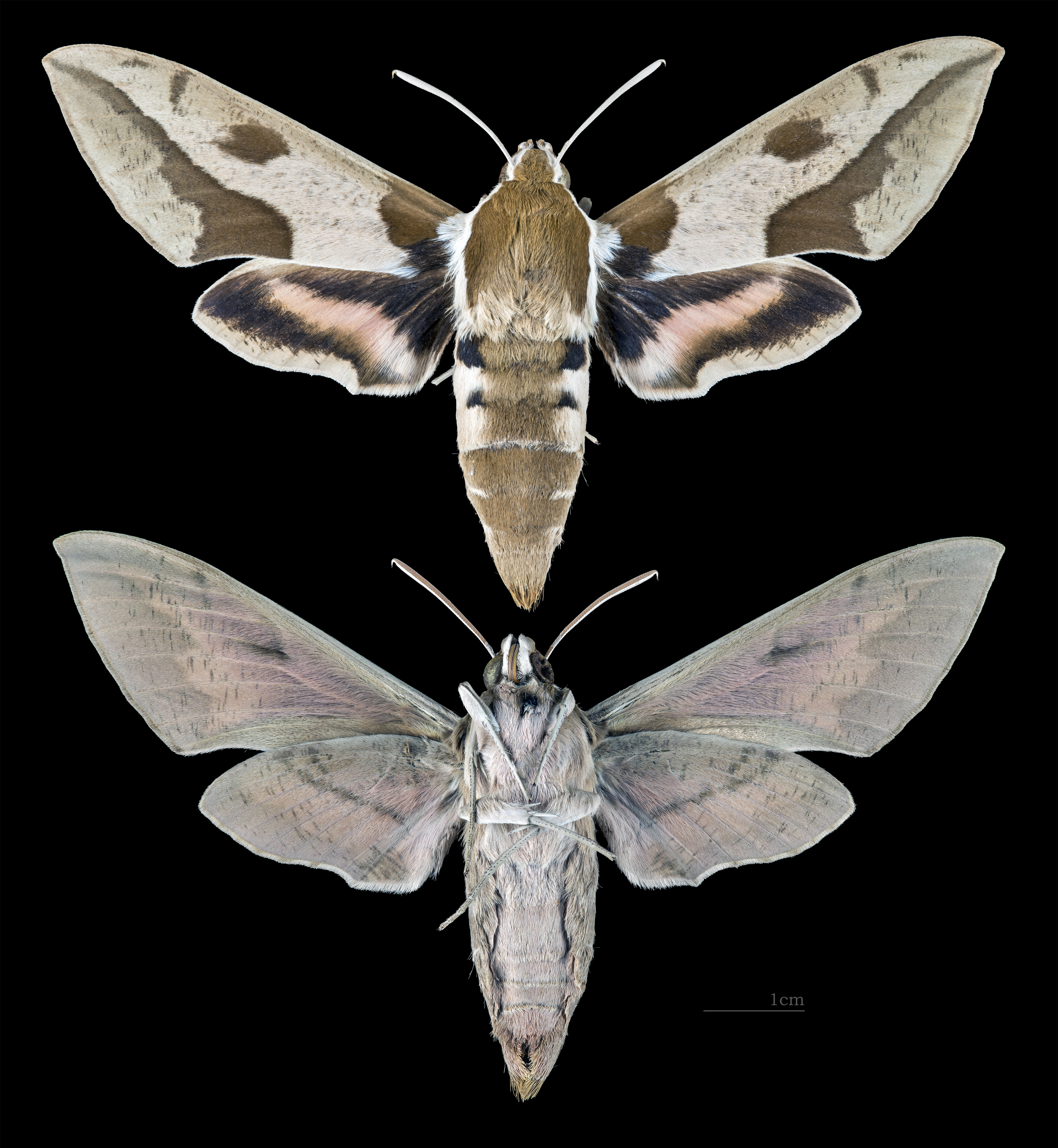

Scientific classification
- Kingdom: Animalia
- Phylum: Arthropoda
- Class: Insecta
- Order: Lepidoptera
- Family: Sphingidae
- Genus: Hyles
- Species: H. nicaea

Binomial name
- Hyles nicaea (de Prunner, 1798)

Synonyms
- Sphinx nicaea de Prunner, 1798; Sphinx cyparissiae Hübner, [1813]; Celerio rubida Oberthür, 1916; Deilephila nicaea castissima Austaut, 1883; Deilephila nicaea carnea Austaut, 1889; Celerio nicaea margine-denticulata Oberthür, 1916; Celerio nicaea albina Oberthür, 1916; Celerio nicaea libanotica Gehlen, 1932; Celerio nicaea sheljuzkoi Dublitzky, 1928; Deilephila nicaea lathyrus Walker, 1856; Deilephila nicaea crimaea A. Bang-Haas, 1906; Deilephila nicaea orientalis Austaut, 1905

= Hyles nicaea =

Mediterranean hawk-moth

Species of moth

Hyles nicaea, the Mediterranean hawk-moth, is a moth of the family Sphingidae. The species was first described by Leonardo de Prunner in 1798.

== Distribution ==
The nominate subspecies is found from southern Portugal and Spain though southern Europe to Turkey. It is also found on the Balearic Islands and in south-western Bulgaria.

== Description ==
The wingspan is 80–100 mm.

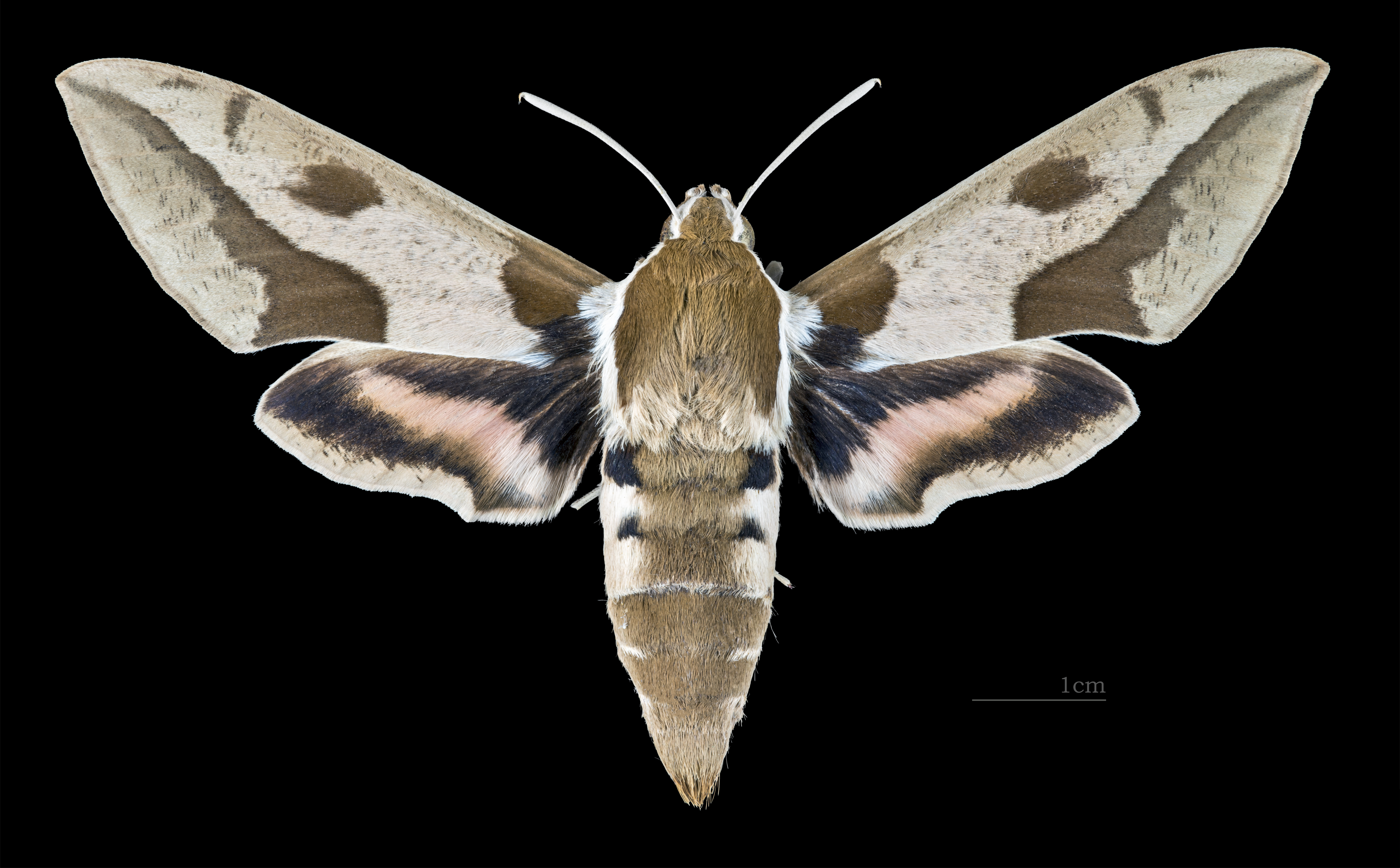
Female Hyles nicaea nicaea

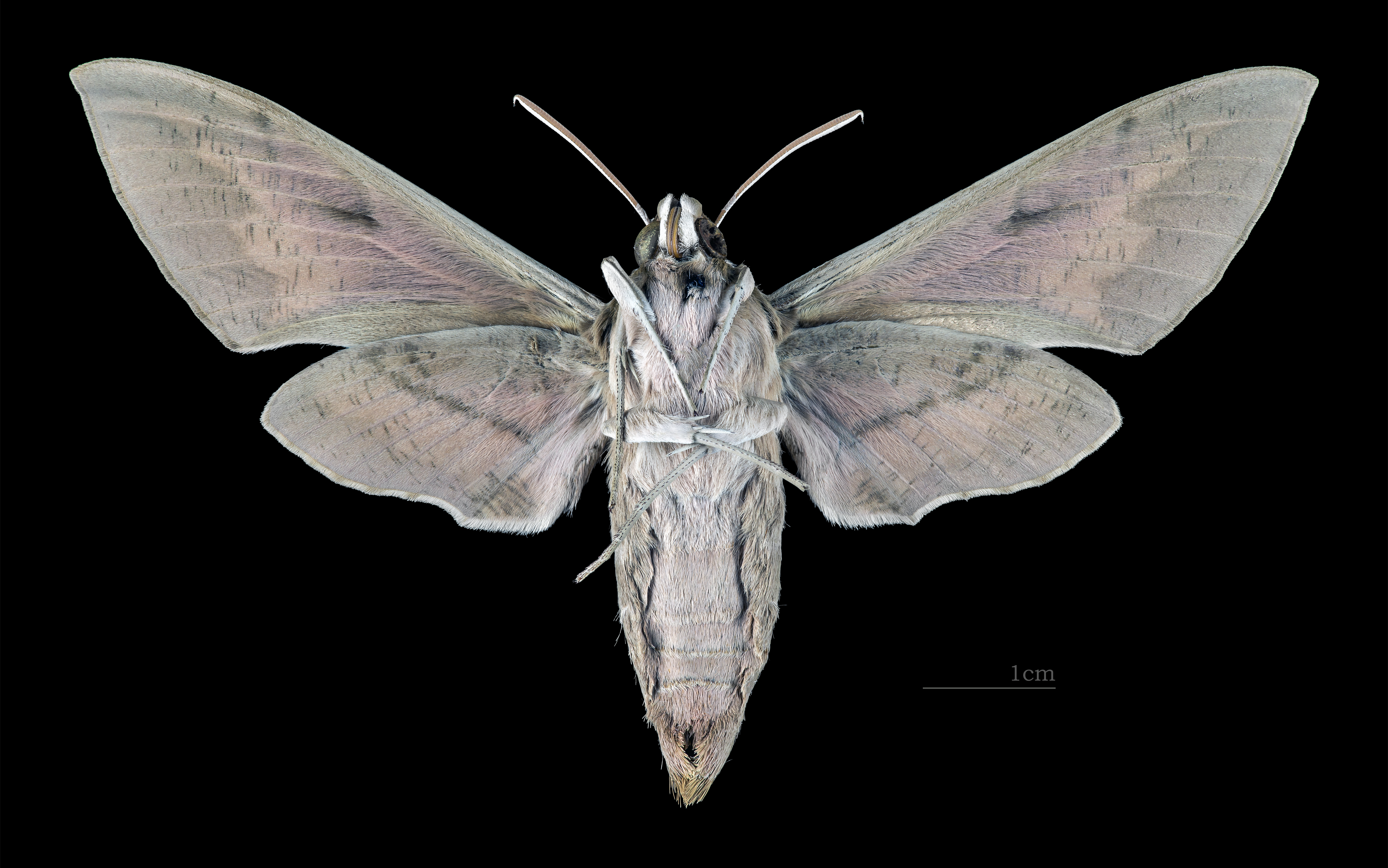
Female Hyles nicaea nicaea, underside

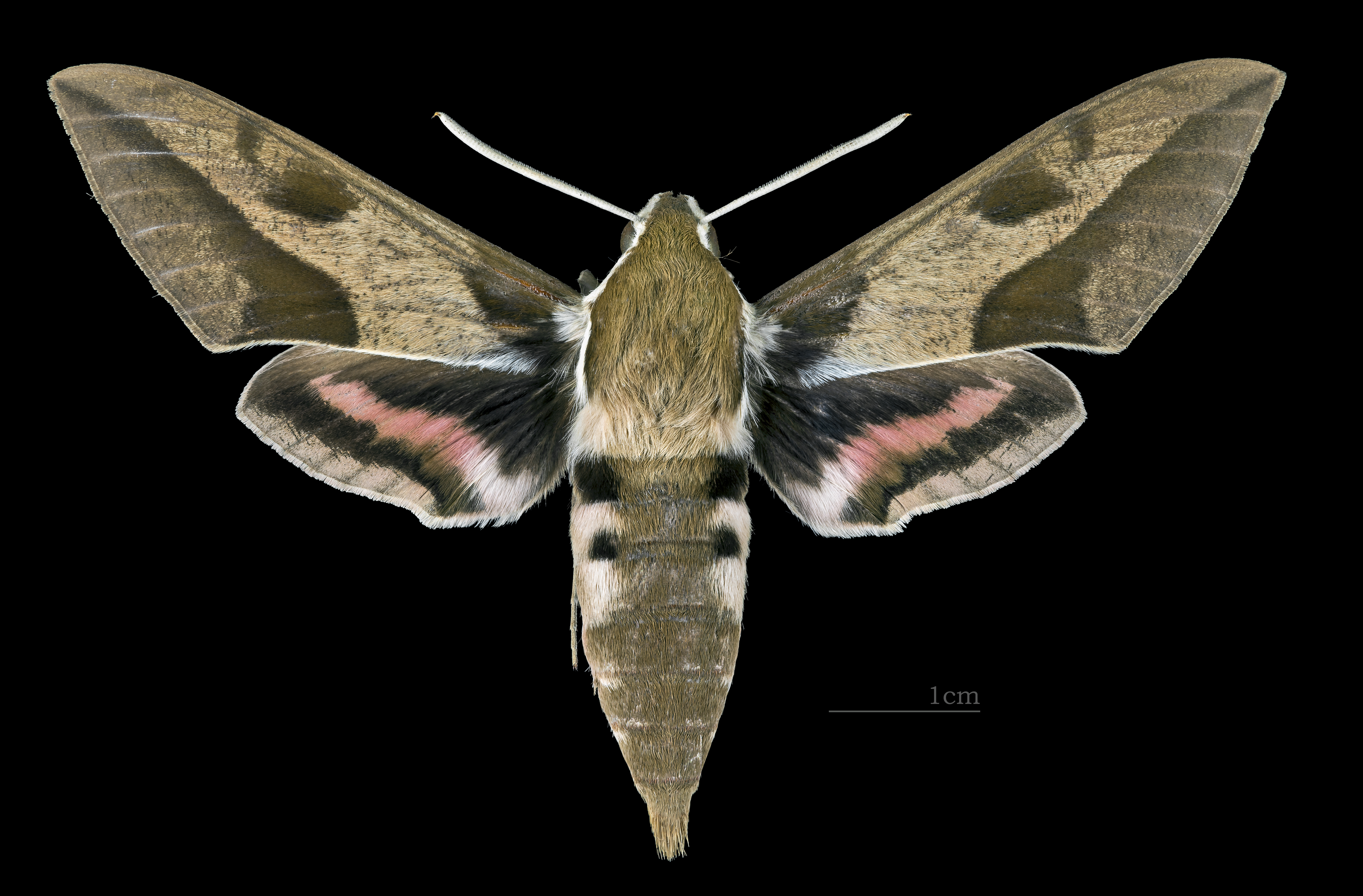
Male Hyles nicaea nicaea

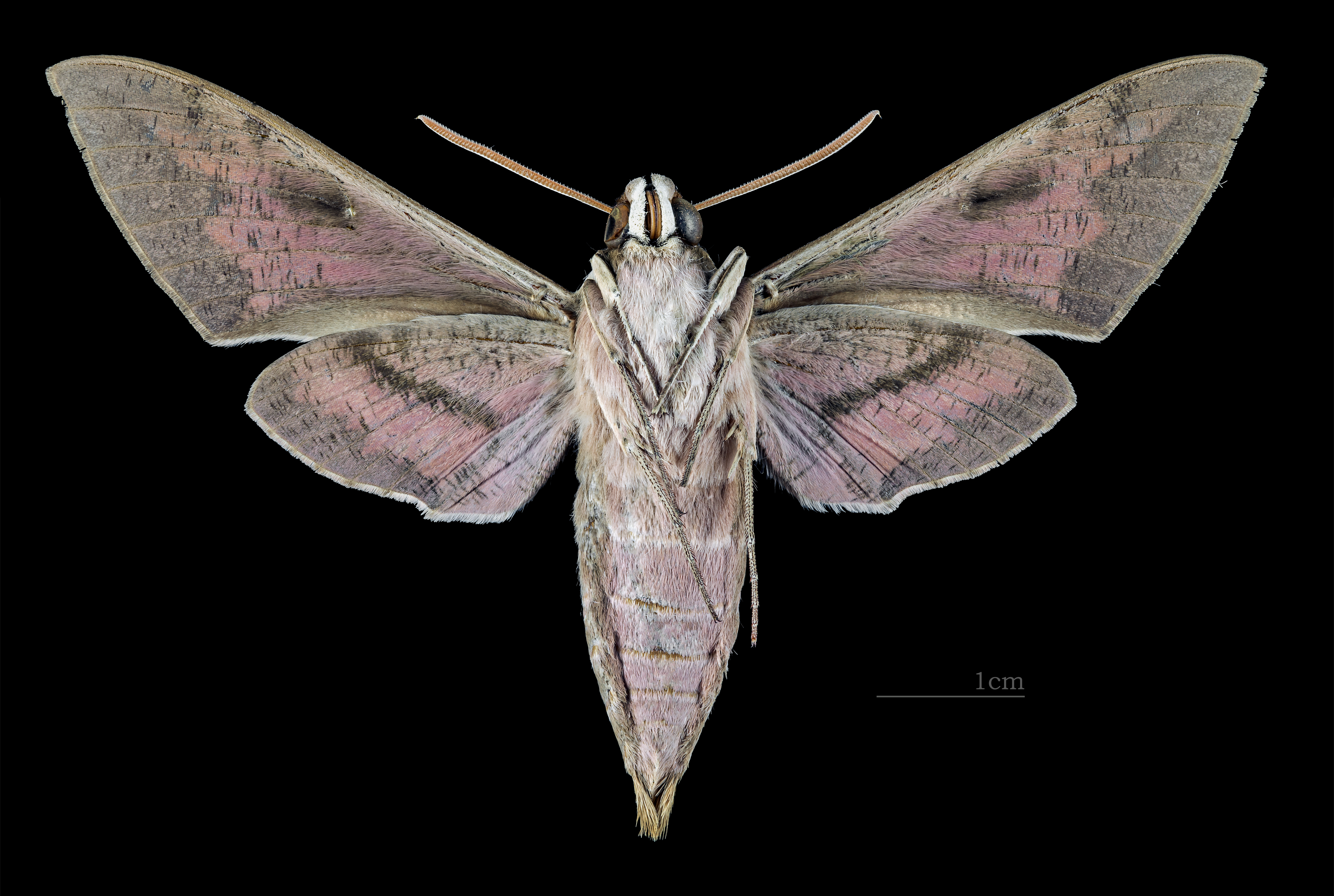
Male Hyles nicaea nicaea, underside

== Biology ==
Adults are on wing in June in one generation. At times there is a partial second generation in August. Subspecies H. n. castissima is on wing from May to June and from July to August in two generations. Subspecies H. n. orientalis is on wing from June to July in one generation. Subspecies H. n. sheljuzkoi is on wing in May and July/August in two to three generations.

The larvae feed on Euphorbia species, including Euphorbia nicaeensis. Subspecies H. n. orientalis feeds on Euphorbia petrophila and Euphorbia seguieriana and H. n. sheljuzkoi has been recorded on Euphorbia oxydonta in Jordan.

== Subspecies ==
- Hyles nicaea nicaea
- Hyles nicaea lathyrus (eastern Afghanistan, north-western India and Xizang)
- Hyles nicaea castissima (Atlas Mountains of North Africa)
- Hyles nicaea sheljuzkoi (Lebanon and northern Israel to western Xinjiang in China)
- Hyles nicaea orientalis (southern Crimea and western Transcaucasia)
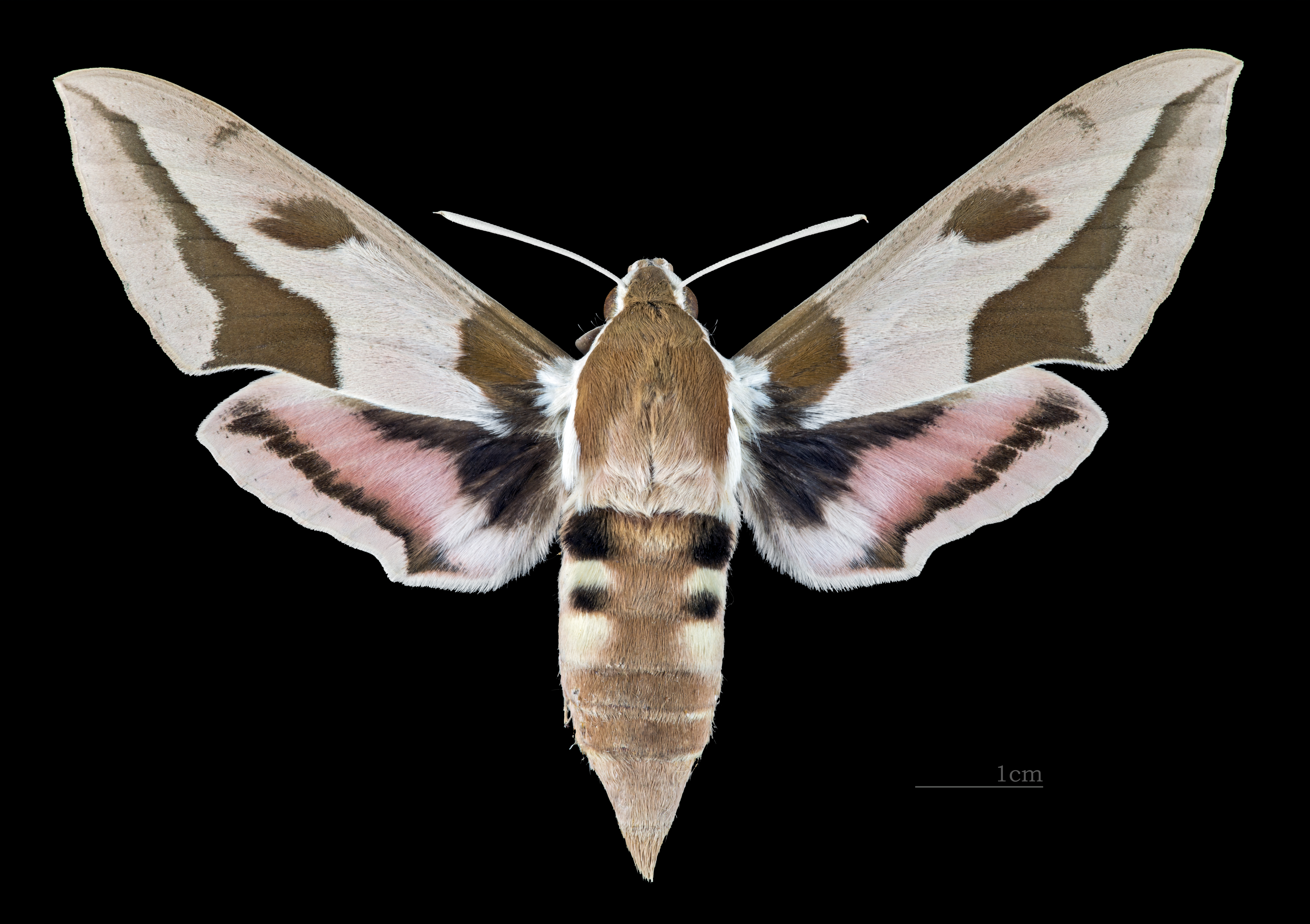
Female Hyles nicaea castissima

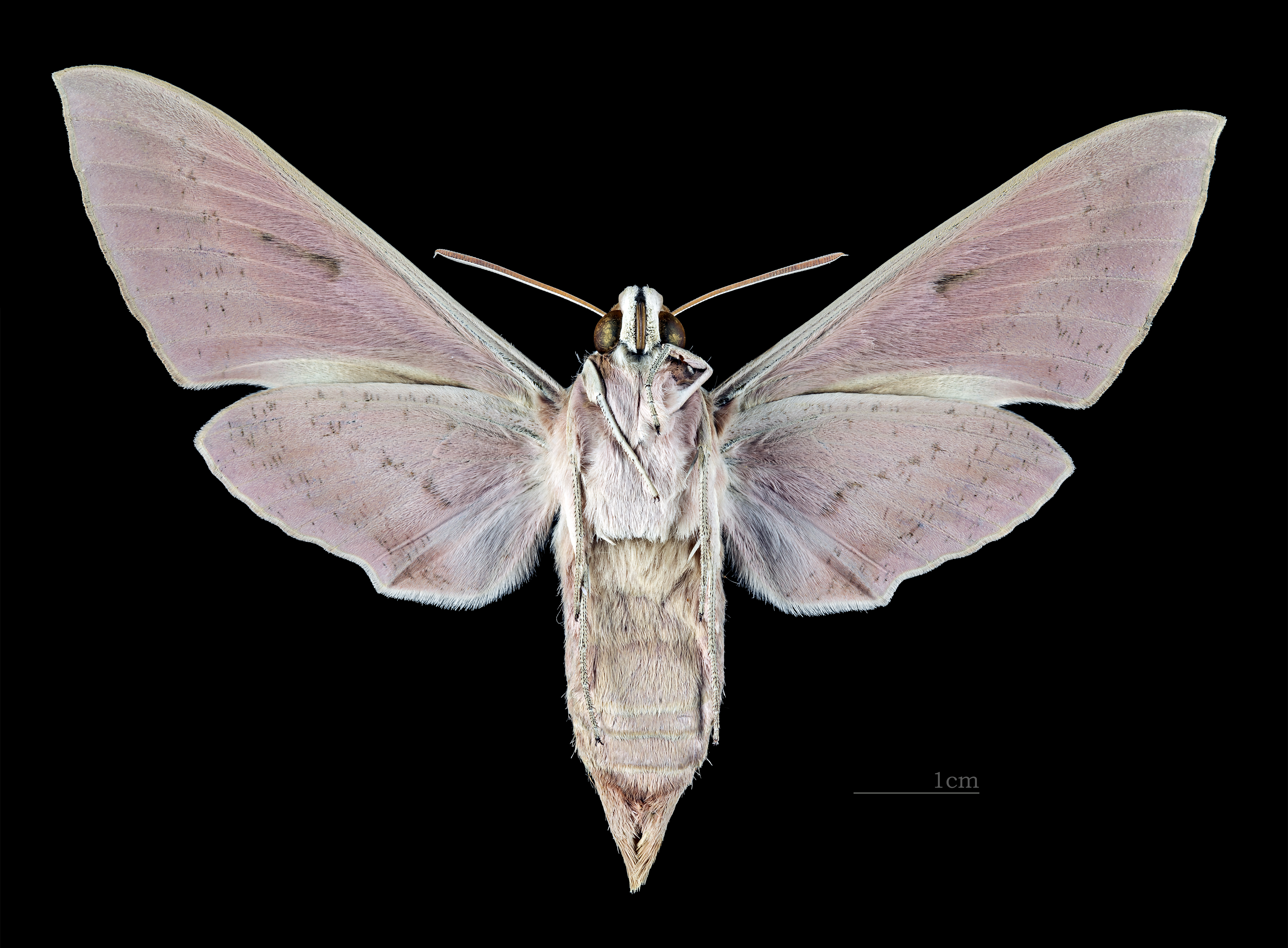
Female Hyles nicaea castissima, underside

== Gallery ==
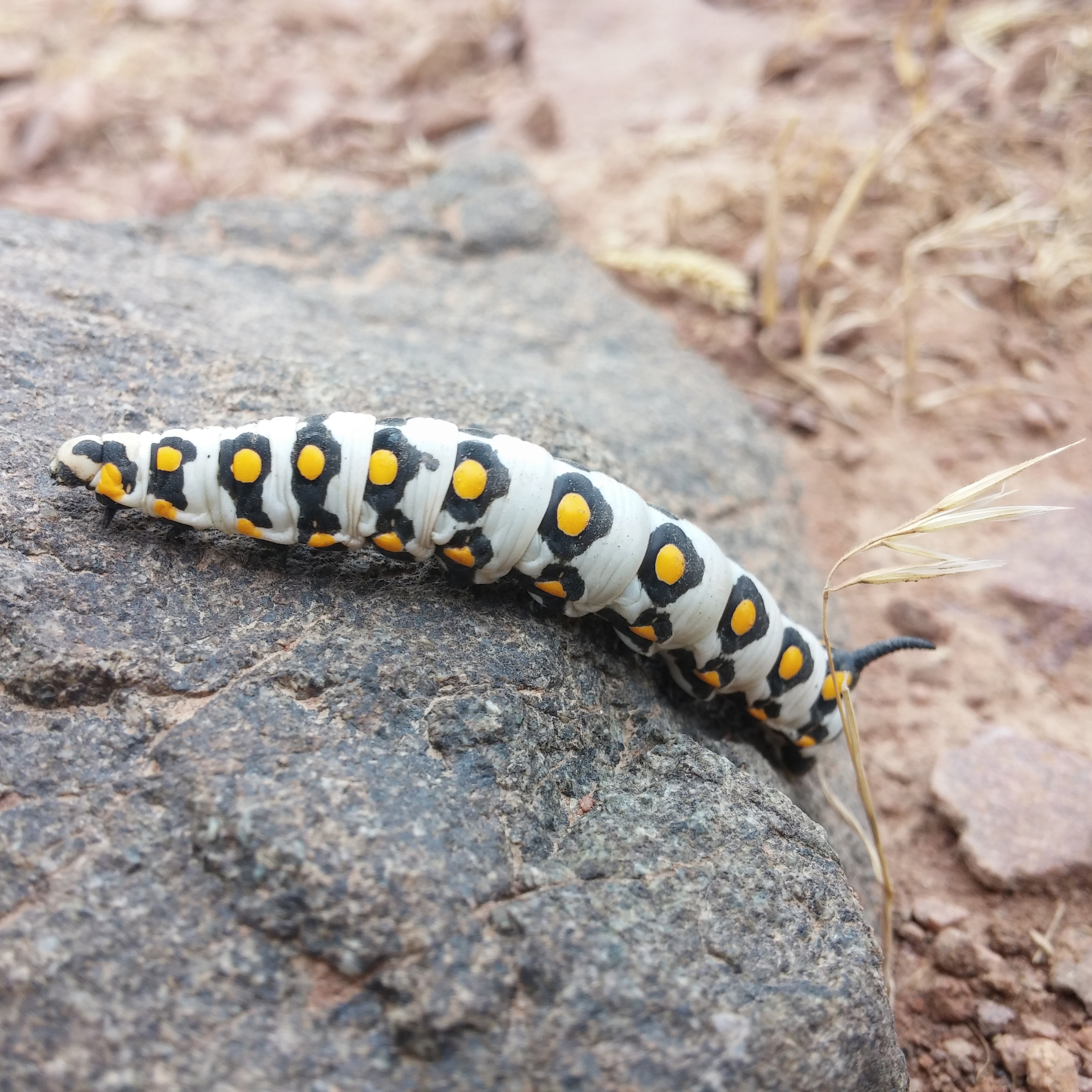
A Hyles nicaea caterpillar on the southern slopes of the Alborz Mountains, near Jaban, Damavand, Iran, at 2870 m elevation in alpine scrubland.

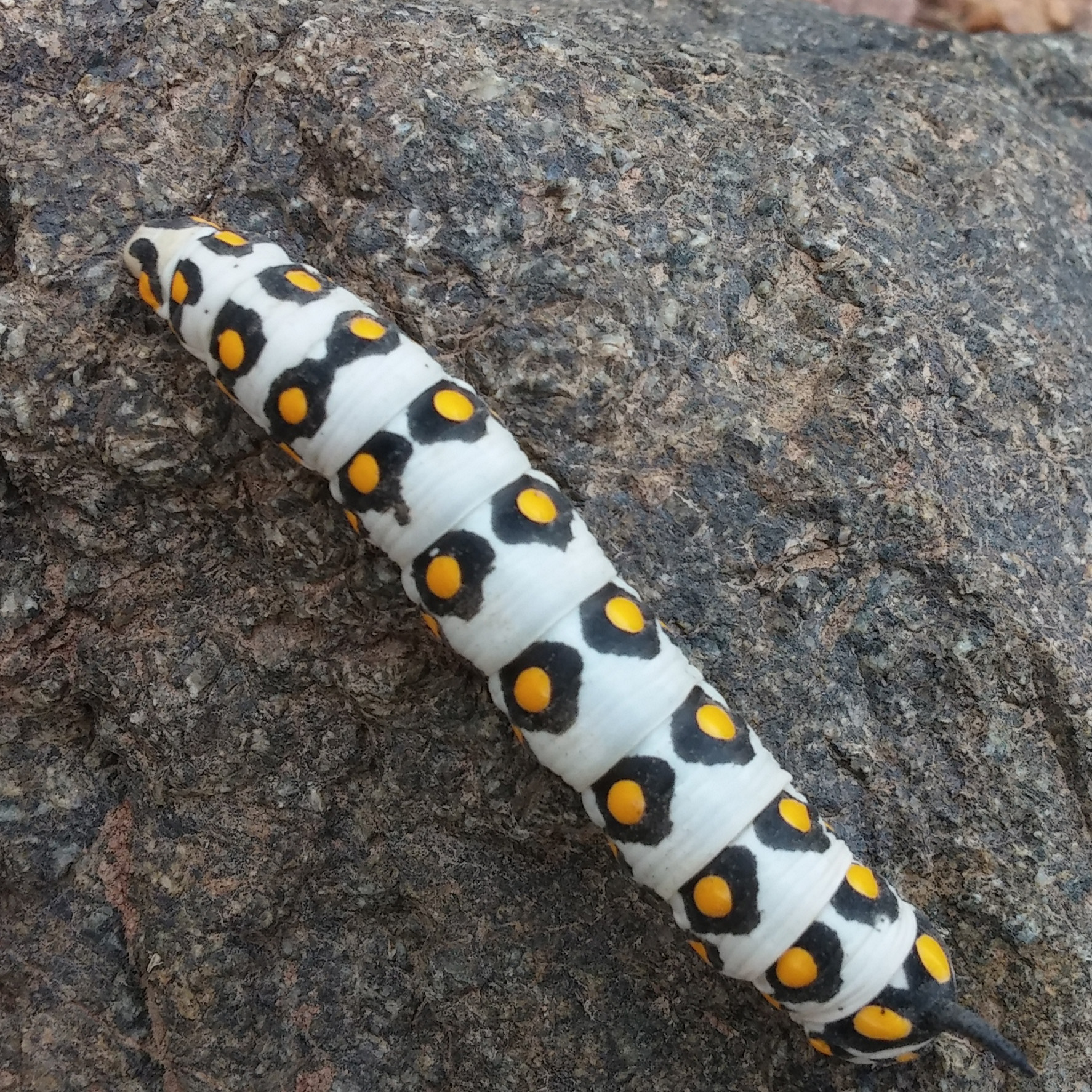
In the same location
