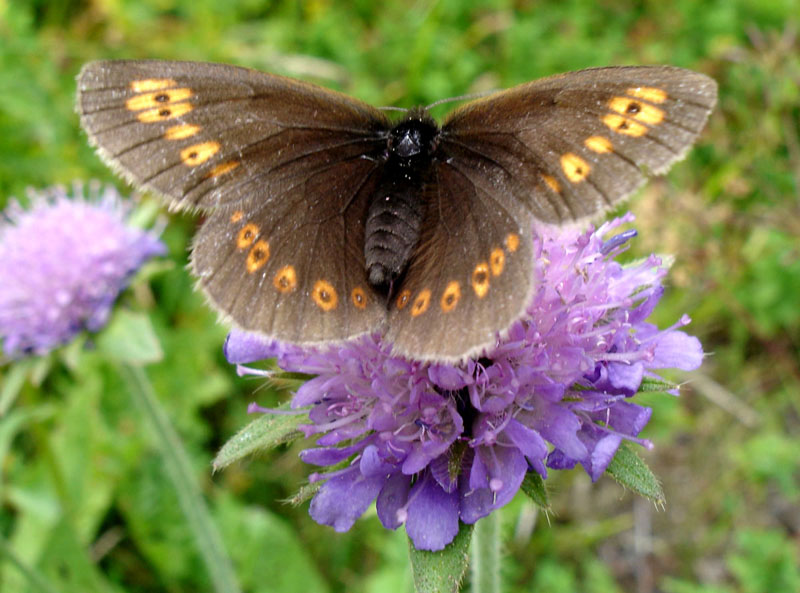
- Upperside
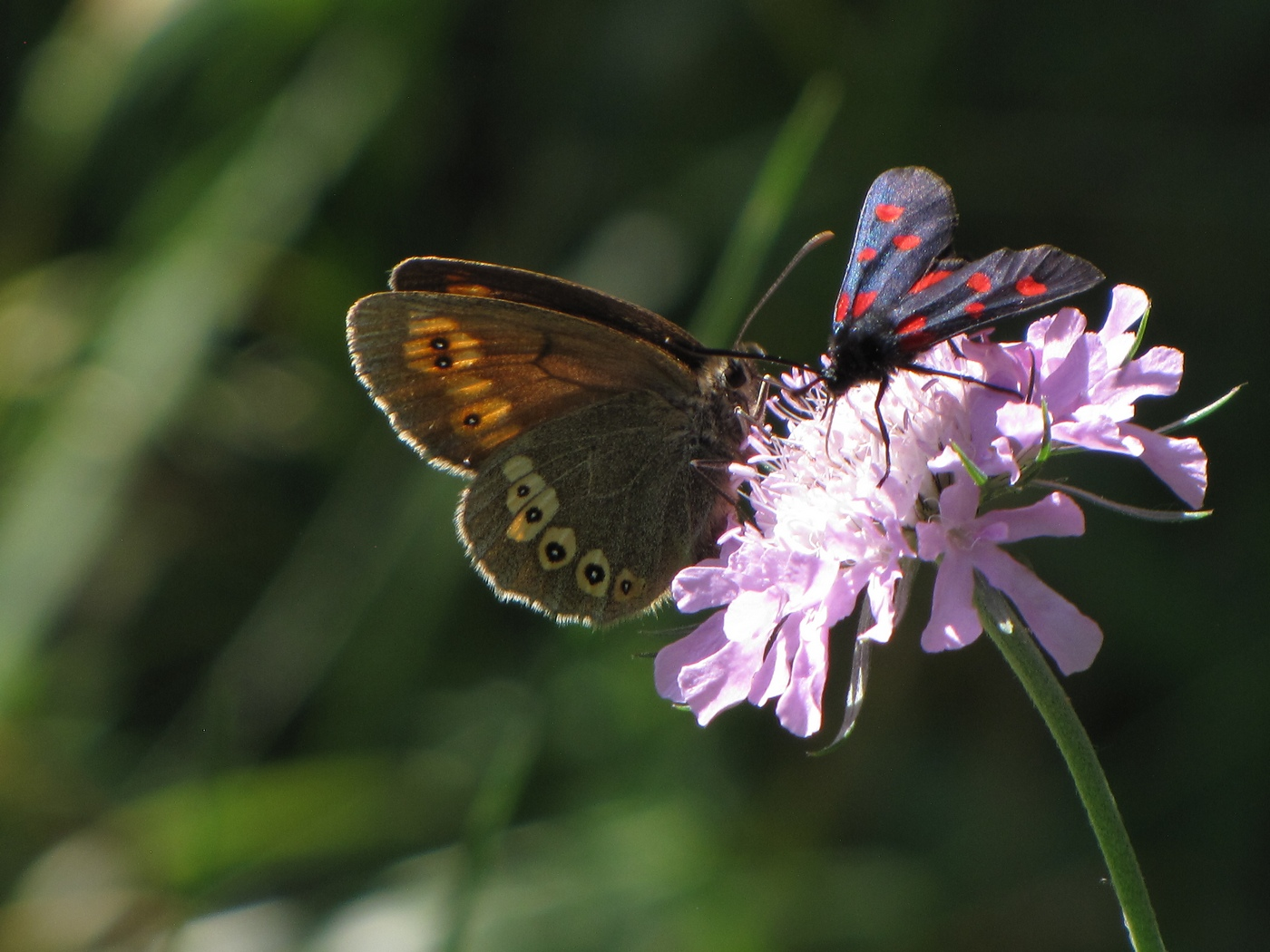
- Female, underside

Scientific classification
- Domain: Eukaryota
- Kingdom: Animalia
- Phylum: Arthropoda
- Class: Insecta
- Order: Lepidoptera
- Family: Nymphalidae
- Genus: Erebia
- Species: E. alberganus

Binomial name
- Erebia alberganus (Prunner, 1798)

= Erebia alberganus =

Almond ringlet

Species of butterfly

Erebia alberganus, the almond ringlet or almond-eyed ringlet, is a butterfly of the family Nymphalidae.

== Subspecies ==
- Erebia alberganus alberganus (Prunner, 1798)
- Erebia alberganus phorcys (Freyer, 1836) (Bulgaria)

== Distribution and habitat ==
This species can be found in the alpine regions of France, Italy, Switzerland, and Austria, in the mountains of central Italy and in some mountains of the northern Balkans. These butterflies live in flowery meadows, clearings, grassy places, amongst scrub or woodland, at an elevation of 1,000–2,200 metres (3,300–7,200 ft) above sea level.

== Description ==
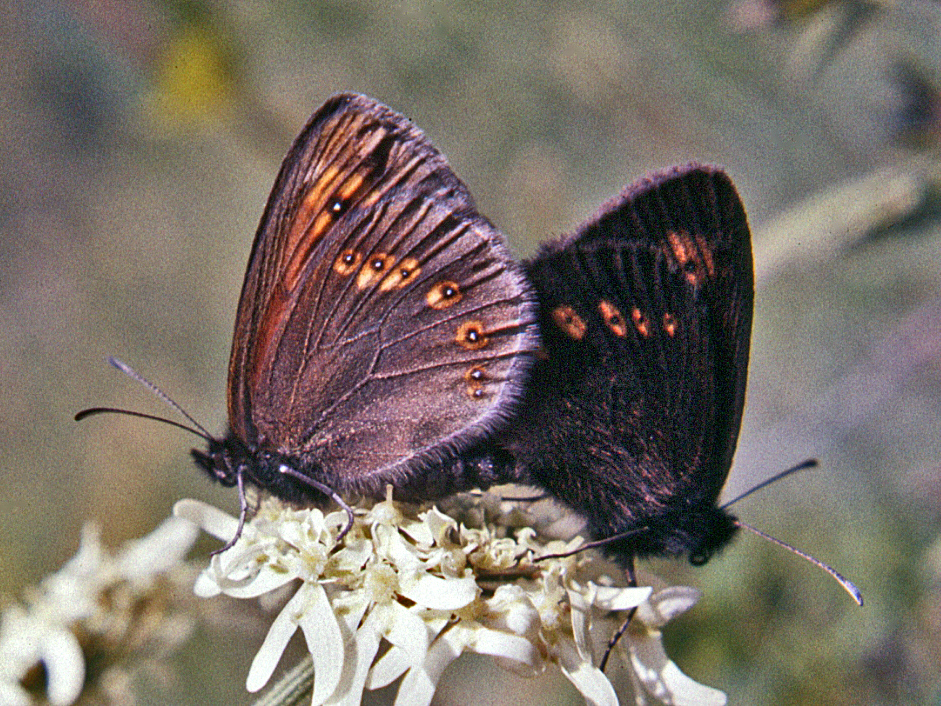
Mating pair

Erebia alberganus has a wingspan of 40 mm. These small butterflies have dark brown wings, with a series of distinctive postdiscal oval or almond shaped (hence the common name) orange markings containing small black spots with white highlights. The two sides of the wings are identical. The females usually are slightly larger and lighter brown than the males. Moreover, the eyespots have small white centres.

This species is rather similar to a woodland ringlet but has smaller eyespots. Wheeler (1903) gives a short description (as ceto)

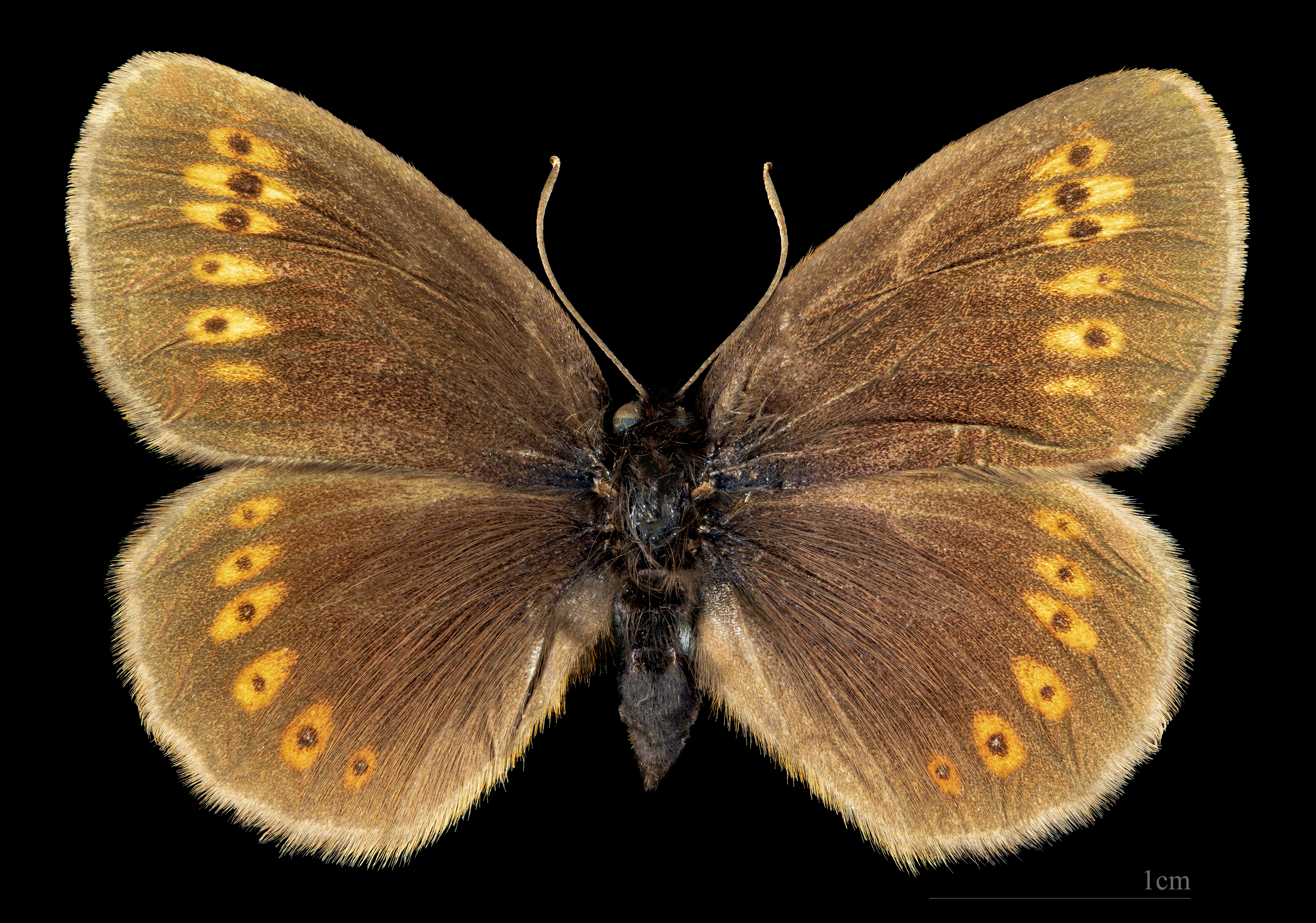
Erebia alberganus ♂

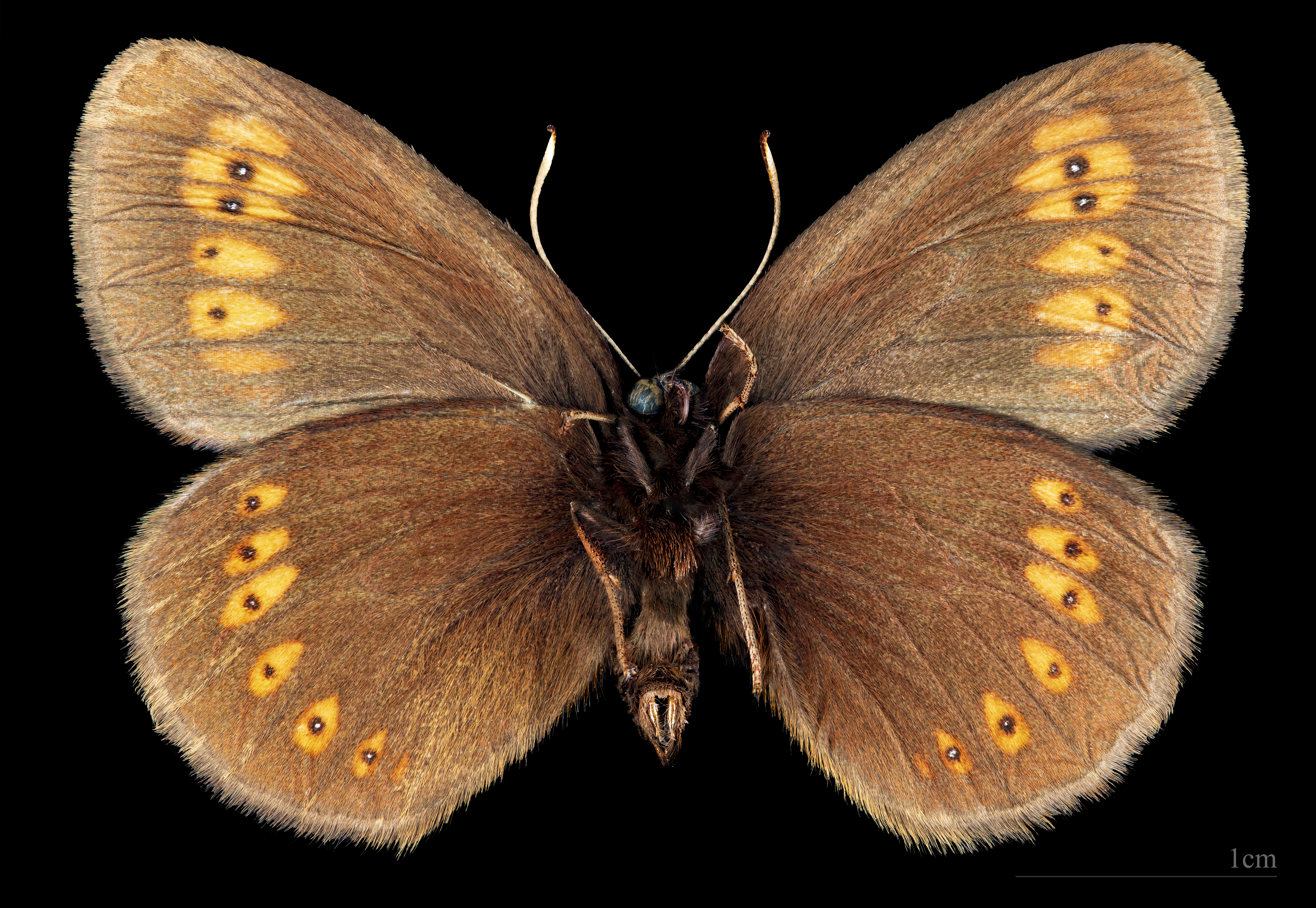
Erebia alberganus ♂ △

== Biology ==
Caterpillars feed on Gramineae, Poa annua, sheep's fescue (Festuca ovina) and sweet vernal-grass (Anthoxanthum odoratum). When they are half-grown they hibernate. They pupate at the following spring. Adults fly from mid-June to August.
