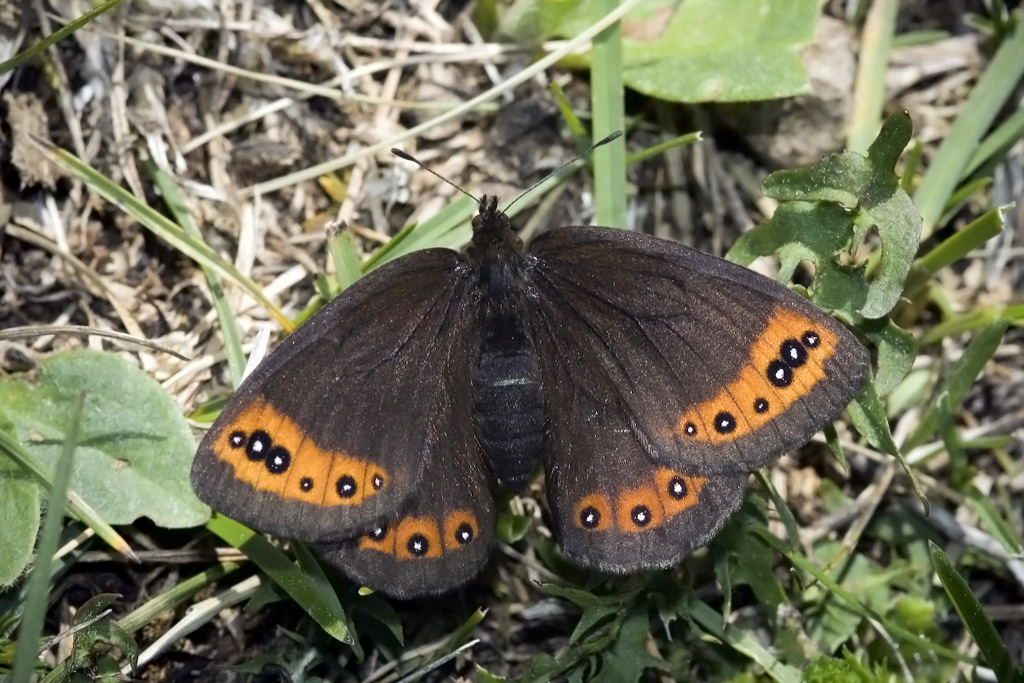

Conservation status
- Near Threatened (IUCN 3.1)

Scientific classification
- Kingdom: Animalia
- Phylum: Arthropoda
- Clade: Pancrustacea
- Class: Insecta
- Order: Lepidoptera
- Family: Nymphalidae
- Genus: Erebia
- Species: E. triarius

Binomial name
- Erebia triarius (de Prunner, 1798)

= De Prunner's ringlet =

de Prunner's ringlet

Species of butterfly

The de Prunner's ringlet (Erebia triarius) is a member of the subfamily Satyrinae of the family Nymphalidae.

== Distribution ==
It is a mountain butterfly found in Albania, Andorra, Austria, Switzerland, France, Italy, Spain, Portugal and Yugoslavia.

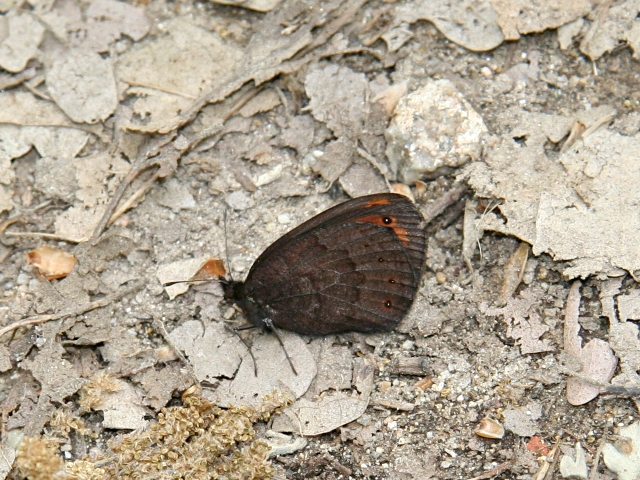

== Description in Seitz ==
E. evias God. (= bonellii Hbn.) (3.5 g). Always somewhat larger than the preceding [stygne] : the upperside of the wings dark black-brown, the forewing with a russet-red or reddish yellow transverse band bearing 5 white-centred black ocelli of different sizes, 3 of them standing near the costa and being united, while the 2 others stand further back and are somewhat smaller. The band of the hindwing consists of 4-5 oval brown spots, each bearing a white-centred black ocellus. The forewing beneath is similarly marked as above, the hindwing of the male being black, thinly dusted with grey, and bearing a more or less dark median band which is somewhat excurved between the veins. In the lighter discal margin there are 3-5 white-pupilled black ocelli. The female is brownish grey beneath, costal and distal margins of the forewing marmorated with grey and brown like the hindwing, the median band of the latter being more prominent than in the male. — The smaller form from the Pyrenees, pyrenaica Stgr., has the underside more strongly marked, the russet-red band is narrower and the ocelli are absent or strongly reduced. — The form hispanica Zap. (37 a) is somewhat smaller, the transverse band being lighter in both sexes, the ocelli smaller, and the upper 3 ocelli in the band of the forewing moreover are not united as in nymotypical erias, but stand separated one below the other. — The species appears already the middle of May in warmer localities, flying from June to August at higher altitudes, and occurs on grassy slopes; plentiful in most f!ight places. The insect is found in the Pyrenees, the lower Alps of Southern France, in Wallis and the Southern Tyrol.

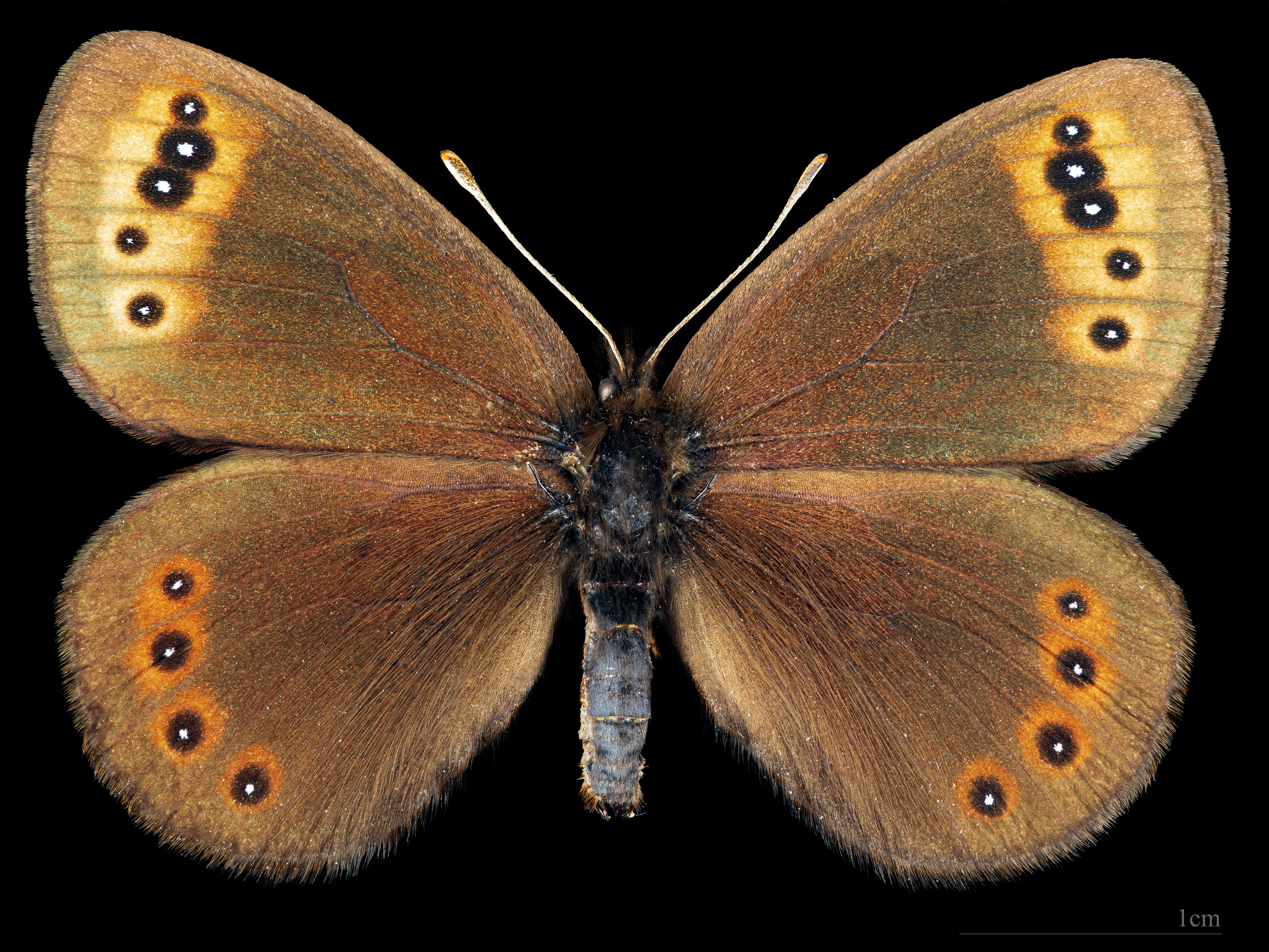
Erebia triarius ♂

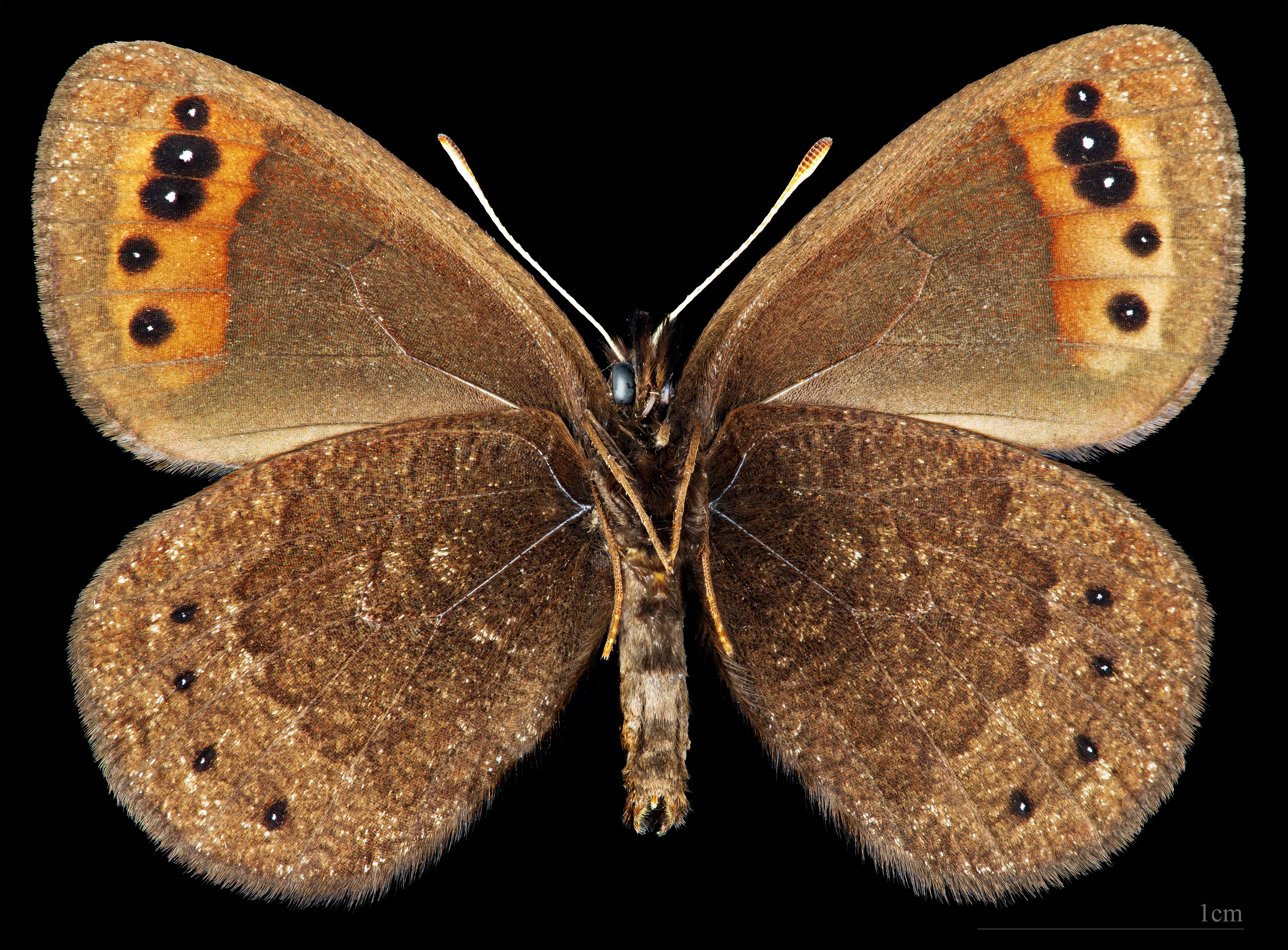
Erebia triarius ♂ △
