= Leonardo De Prunner =

Le Chevalier Leonardo De (or de) Prunner (died 1831) was an Italian soldier, a mineralogist and an entomologist. He wrote Catalogus larvarum Europae (1793, 39 pages) and Lepidoptera Pedemontana illustrata (1798, 127 pages).

== Sources ==
- Cesare Conci et Roberto Poggi (1996), Iconography of Italian Entomologists, with essential biographical data. Memorie della Società entomologica Italiana, 75 : 159–382.
- Courte bibliographie en italien de Musei universitari
