= Heinzenberg GR =

Coordinates: 46°44′23″N 9°24′31″E

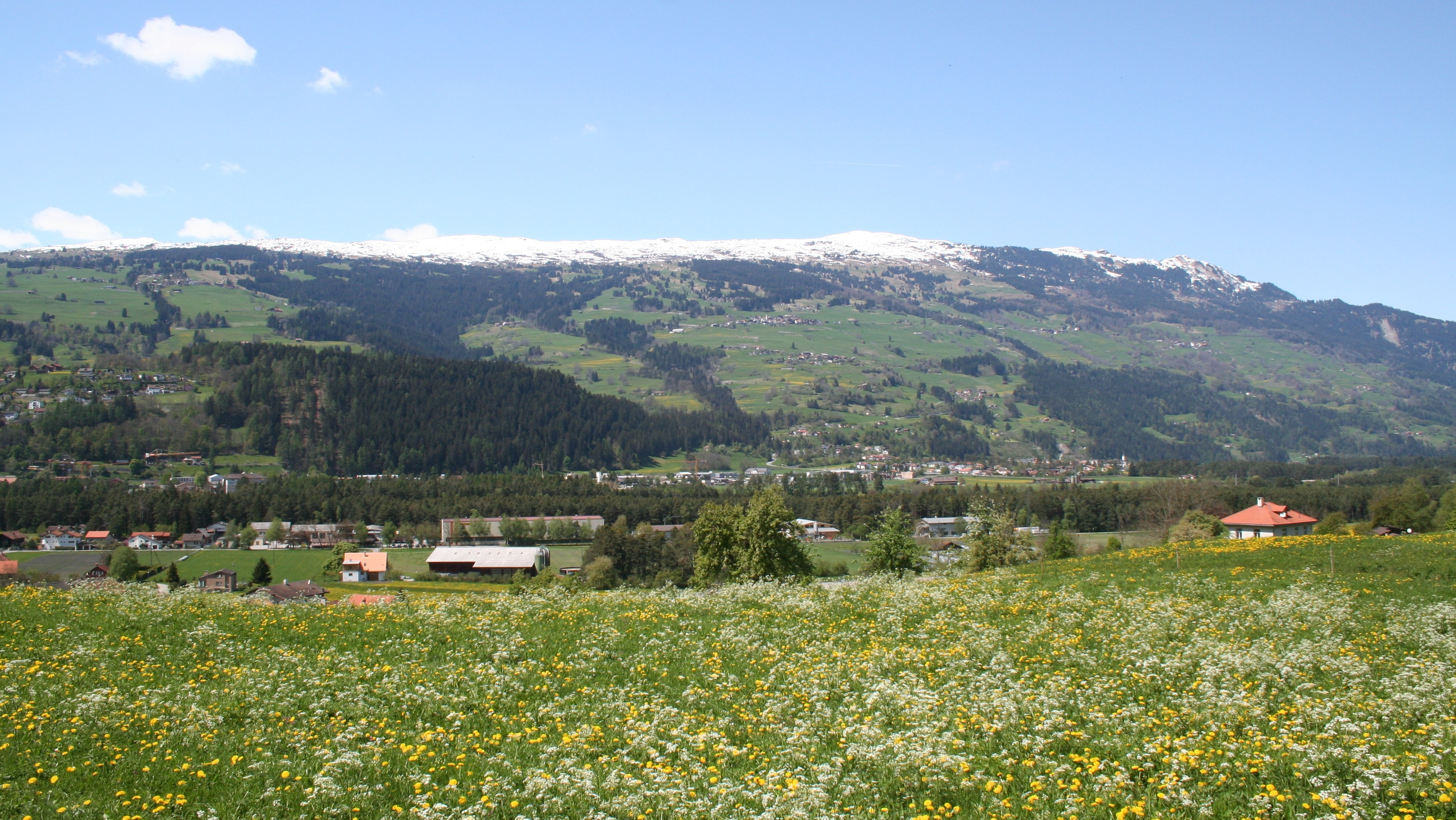
Heinzenberg

Heinzenberg (Romansh: Mantogna) is the western side of Hinterrhein valley in the Swiss canton of Graubünden between the Viamala and the narrow valley in Rothenbrunnen. The eastern side of the valley is called Domleschg. The region is named after the Heinzenberg Castle near the village of Präz.

== Geography ==
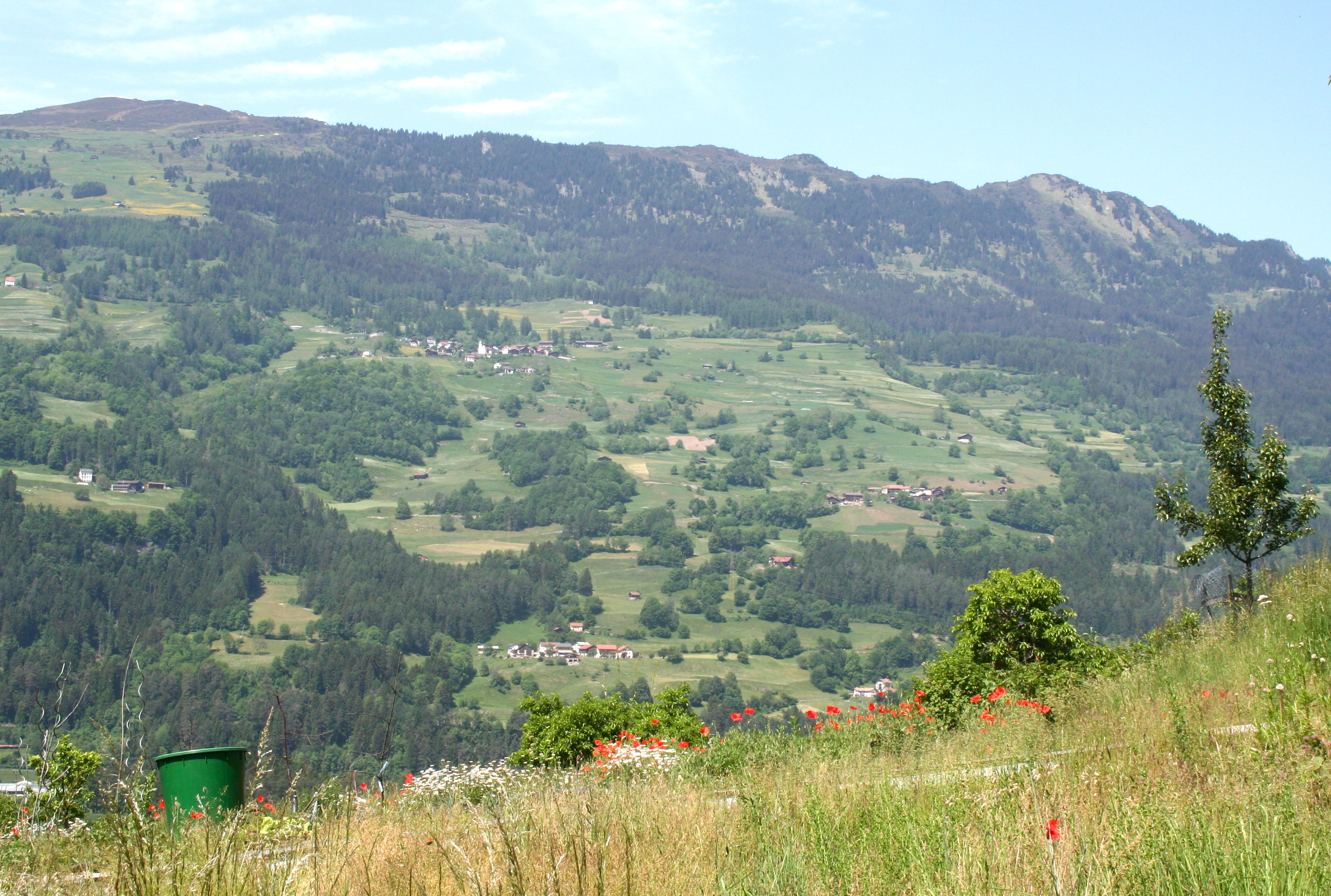
Heinzenberg with Präz

The Heinzenberg area extends for about 10 km from south to north, and is bounded on the west by the Heinzenberg Ridge and on the east by the Posterior Rhine. The slope rises very gently (with a 15 to 20 percent grade), especially in the southern part, and offers good conditions for agriculture. There are meadows and pastures around the villages and on the lower slopes, and fields and fruit trees. Higher up the slopes, there is a zone with Maiensässes. Above 1,800 m above the sea, Alpine meadows can be found. Duke Henri of Rohan praised the diverse landscape exuberantly as "the most beautiful mountain in the world".

The substrate of the area consists mostly of Bündner schist, providing little resistance to erosion. The geology of the area is dominated by subsidence and minor landslides. The Nolla brook, which forms the southern border of the Heinzenberg area, dug itself a deep ravine within a few decades at the end of the 18th century and was feared because it often caused floods in Thusis. It took extensive control structures to stabilize the situation. The Porteiner Tobel also shows extensive erosion damage.

The Heinzenberg Ridge begins in the south with the 1848 m high Glas Pass, a historically significant bridle path connecting Thusis to the Safien valley. A trail exists along the ridge, which provides nice views of the valley. The highest points along the trail are Lüschgrat (2179 m), Tguma (2163 m) and Präzerhöhi (2120 m). To the west, the ridge falls off abruptly into the Safien valley.

== Municipalities ==
The largest villages are Thusis and Cazis at the bottom of the slope at about 700 m above sea level. Slightly higher (850 to 1000 m) are the villages of Masein and Tartar. Higher still (1140–1270 m) are the villages of Urmein Flerden, Portein Sarn and Präz. The highest community is the typical Walser scattered settlement Tschappina at 1400 to 1600 m.

Use of the German language spread from Thusis to the smaller villages, displacing the Sutsilvan dialect of the traditional Romansh language almost completely. Today only a handful of elderly people in the more remote parts of Heinzenberg (in particular Präz) speak Romansh. All communities joined the Reformation in the 16th century, except Cazis.

The ten municipalities together form the Kreis ("sub-district") of Thusis. Until 1 January 2001, the Kreise of Thusis, Domleschg and Safien formed the district of Heinzenberg. Today, the Kreis of Thusis is part of the district of Hinterrhein.

== Transport ==
From time immemorial, the Posterior Rhine valley was a transit area on the route from Chur to the Alpine passes of the Splügen and San Bernardino. Today, transport arteries exist on both sides of the river: the highway A13 on the Domleschg side, and the Rhaetian Railway on the Heinzenberg side.

The Heinzenberg area is served by two Postauto lines:

- Thusis – Präz
- Thusis – Obertschappina, in summer to Glas Pass
