= Safiental =

- Municipality
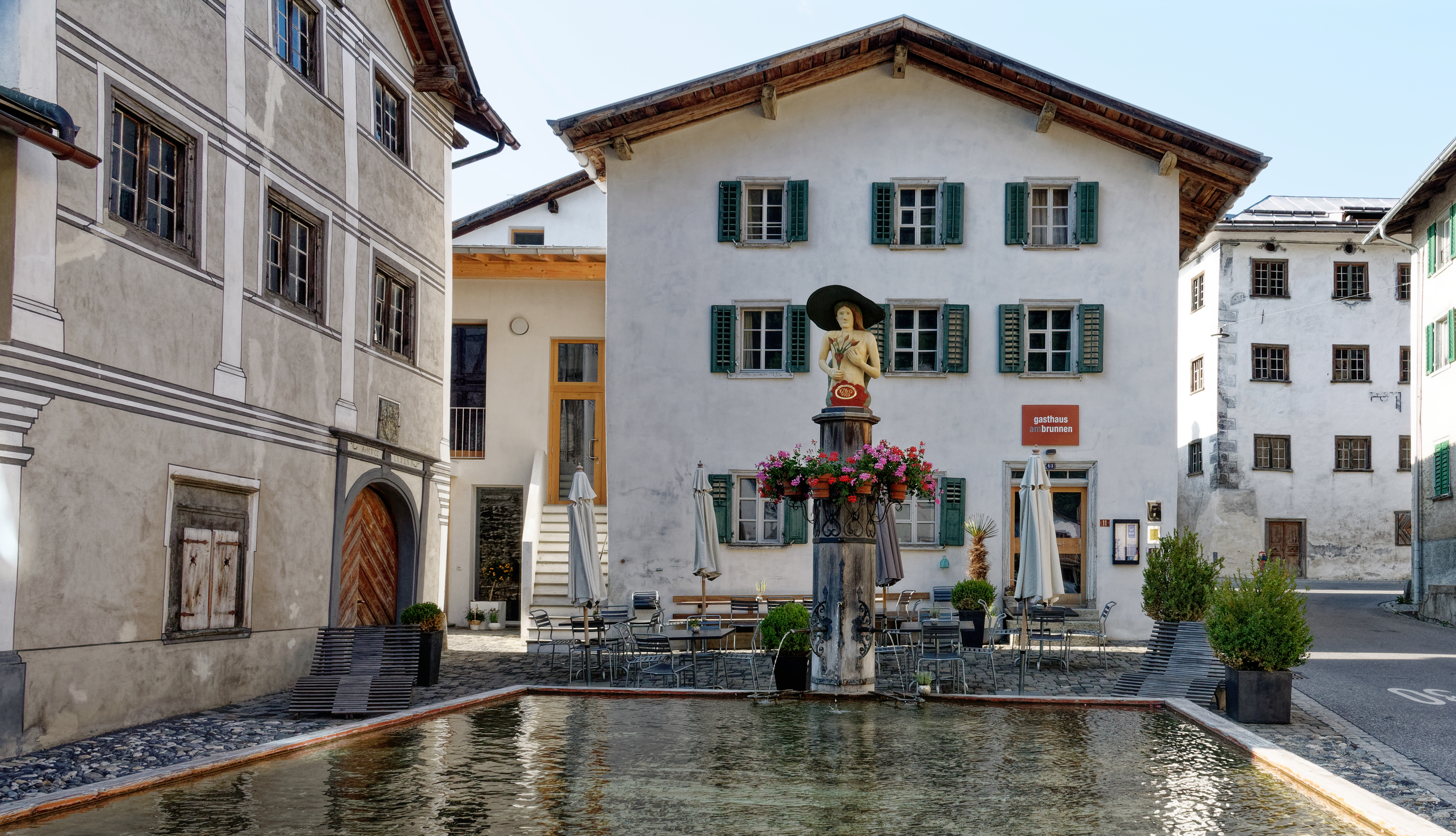
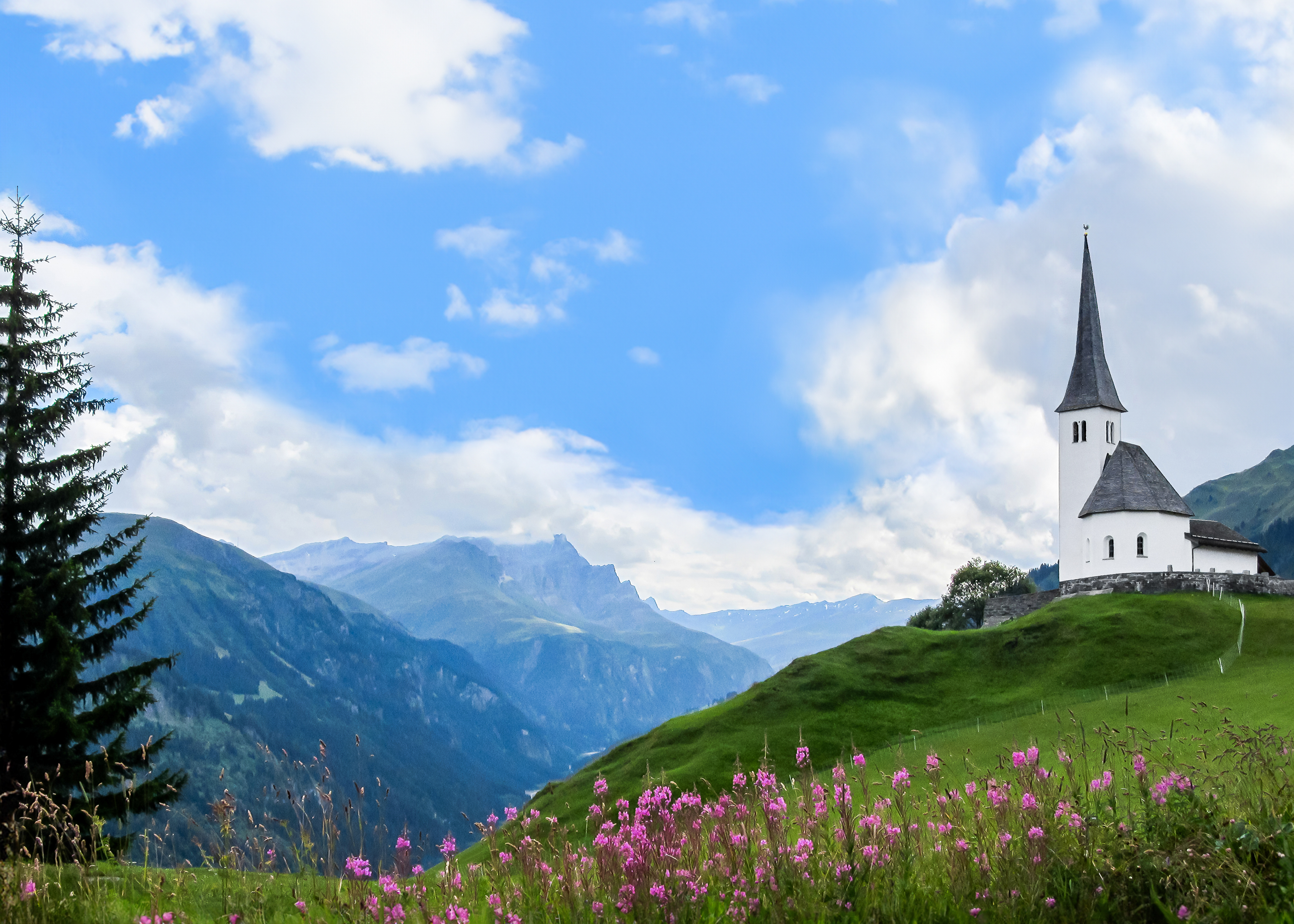
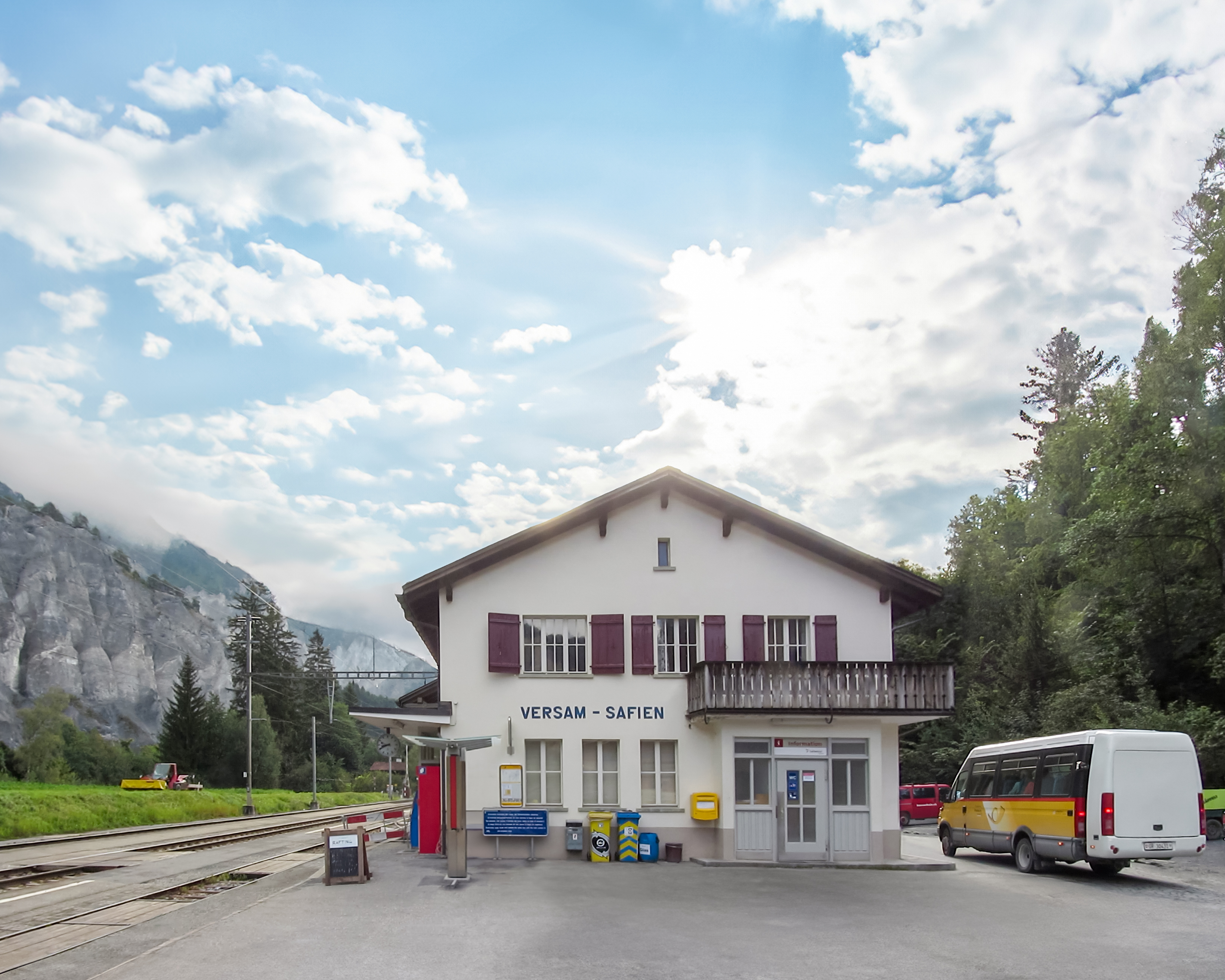
- Valendas town center and fountain Tenna's church Versam-Safien railway station

- Flag Coat of arms
- Location of Safiental
- Location within Switzerland Location within Canton of Grisons
- Coordinates: 46°47′N 9°16′E
- Country: Switzerland
- Canton: Grisons
- District: Surselva

Area
  - Total: 151.42 km^{2} (58.46 sq mi)

Population (Dec 2011)
  - Total: 928
  - Density: 6.13/km^{2} (15.9/sq mi)
- Time zone: UTC+01:00 (CET)
  - Summer (DST): UTC+02:00 (CEST)
- Postal code: 7122/7104/7107/7106
- SFOS number: 3672
- ISO 3166 code: CH-GR
- Surrounded by: Castrisch, Flims, Riein, Sagogn, Bonaduz, Präz, Rhäzüns, Trin, Casti-Wergenstein, Duvin, Flerden, Mathon, Nufenen, Pitasch, Portein, Sankt Martin, Sarn, Splügen, Sufers, Tschappina, Vals
- Website: https://gemeinde.safiental.ch SFSO statistics

Safiental (Romansh: Val Stussavgia) is a municipality in the Surselva Region in the canton of the Grisons in Switzerland. The municipalities of Valendas, Versam, Safien and Tenna merged on 1 January 2013 into the new municipality of Safiental.

== History ==
Valendas is first mentioned in 765 as in Valendano. Versam is first mentioned in 1050 as a valle Versamia. Safien is first mentioned in 1219 as Stosavia. Tenna is first mentioned in 1398 as Thena.

Formerly inhabited by Romansh speakers, it was settled by the Walser in the late 13th century. Population fell from 1,798 in 1850 to 994 in 1980 and has since stabilized around 1,000.

== Geography ==
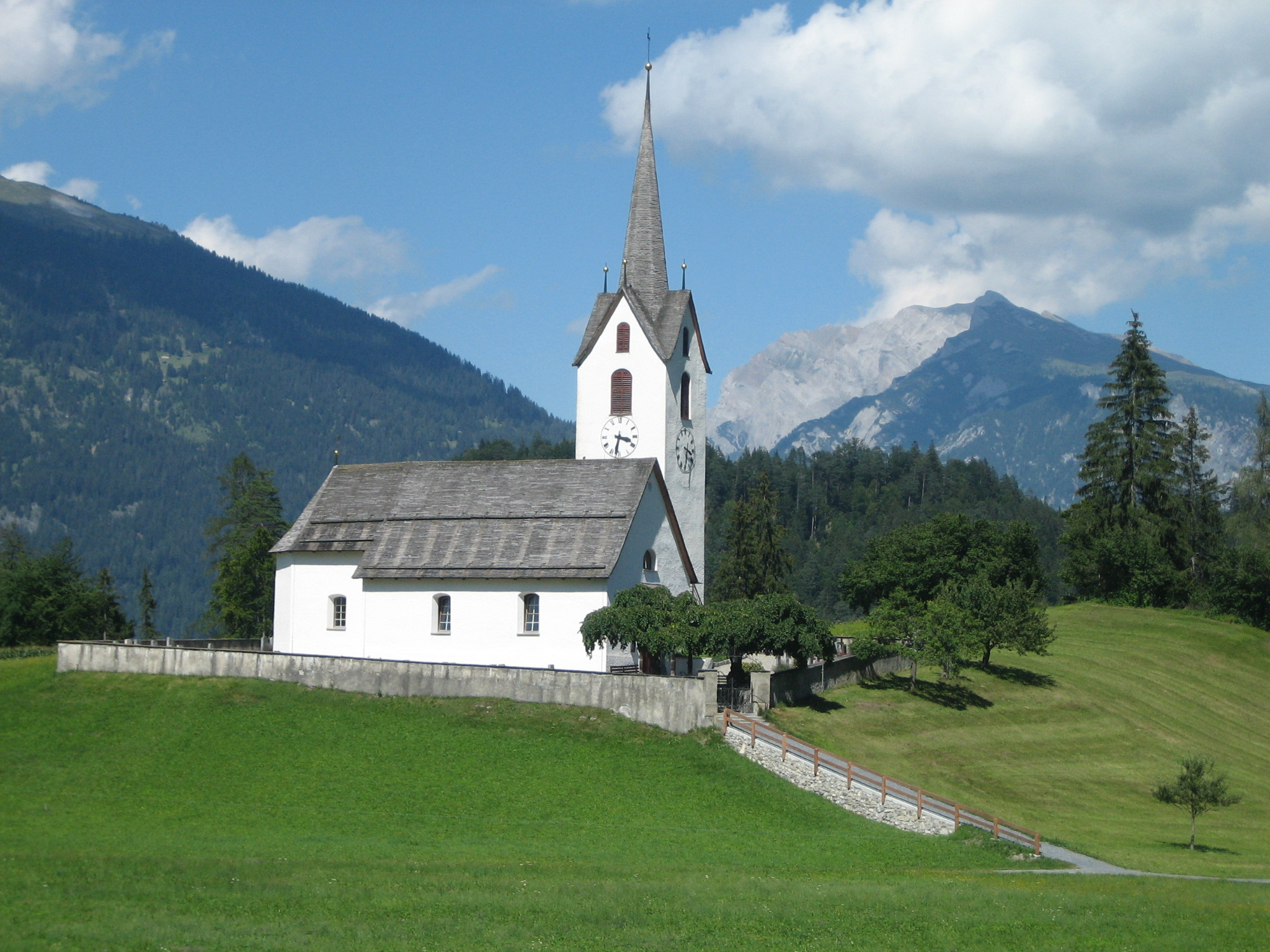
Versam village church

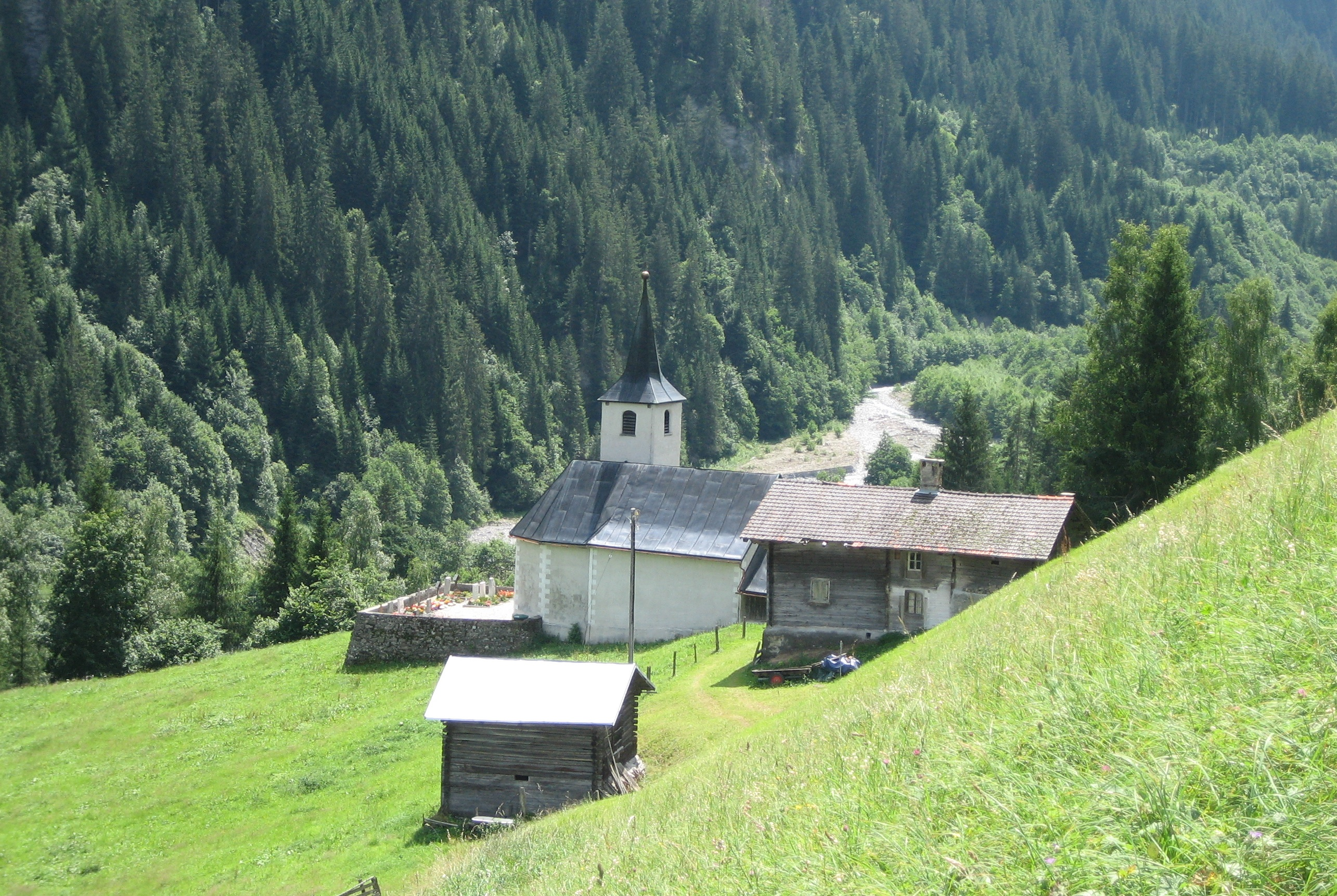
The Neukirch (New Church) hamlet of Safien village

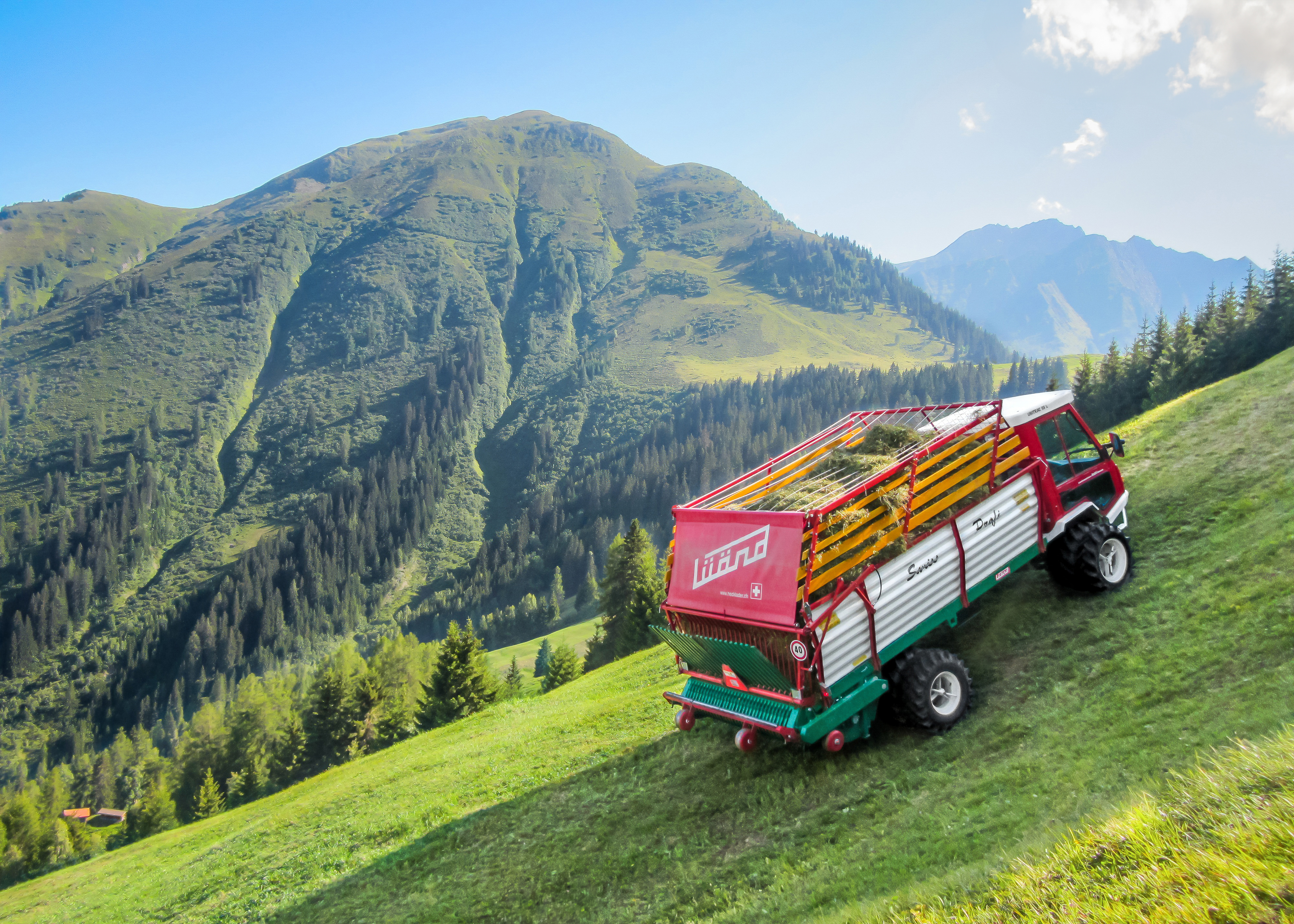
Hay harvesting in Versam

As of the 2004/09 survey, Safiental has an area of 151.42 km^{2} (58.46 sq mi). Of this area, about 38.8% is used for agricultural purposes, while 31.1% is forested. Of the rest of the land, 1.2% is settled (buildings or roads) and 29.0% is unproductive land. In the 2004/09 survey a total of 64 ha (160 acres) or about 0.4% of the total area was covered with buildings, an increase of 21 ha (52 acres) over the 1984/85 amount.

Of the agricultural land, 11 ha (27 acres) is used for orchards and vineyards, 1,398 ha (3,450 acres) is fields and grasslands and 4,683 ha (11,570 acres) consists of alpine grazing areas. Since 1984/85 the amount of agricultural land has decreased by 416 ha (1,030 acres). Over the same time period the amount of forested land has increased by 362 ha (890 acres). Rivers and lakes cover 238 ha (590 acres) in the municipality.

The municipality contains the Safien valley, an alpine valley of the Canton of the Grisons, branching off the Vorderrhein valley.

Safien had an area, as of 2006, of 100.6 km^{2} (38.8 sq mi). Of this area, 45.6% is used for agricultural purposes, while 18.2% is forested. Of the rest of the land, 0.8% is settled (buildings or roads) and the remainder (35.4%) is non-productive (rivers, glaciers or mountains). Safien was the capital of the Safien sub-district of the Surselva district in the mid and upper Safien valley. The valley is drained by the Rabiusa river. The former municipality consists of the village of Safien-Platz (elevation: 1,350 m (4,430 ft)) and scattered hamlets and single farm houses throughout the valley.

Tenna had an area, as of 2006, of 11.3 km^{2} (4.4 sq mi). Of this area, 45.1% is used for agricultural purposes, while 34% is forested. Of the rest of the land, 1.1% is settled (buildings or roads) and the remainder (19.8%) is non-productive (rivers, glaciers or mountains). It is a German-speaking collection of small settlements on a terrace above the west side of the Safien valley. It consists of the village of Tenna which is made up of the sections of Ausserberg, Mitte and Innerberg as well as the hamlets of Acla and Egschi along the valley road.

Valendas had an area, as of 2006, of 22.8 km^{2} (8.8 sq mi). Of this area, 21.6% is used for agricultural purposes, while 48.7% is forested. Of the rest of the land, 1.8% is settled (buildings or roads) and the remainder (27.9%) is non-productive (rivers, glaciers or mountains). It is located above the right side of the Vorderrhein canyon. It consists of the haufendorf village (an irregular, unplanned and quite closely packed village, built around a central square) of Valendas and the hamlets of Carrera, Brün, Dutjen and Turisch.

Versam had an area, as of 2006, of 16.8 km^{2} (6.5 sq mi). Of this area, 16.8% is used for agricultural purposes, while 70.6% is forested. Of the rest of the land, 2% is settled (buildings or roads) and the remainder (10.6%) is non-productive (rivers, glaciers or mountains). It is located above the Vorderrhein canyon at the entrance to the Safien Valley. It consists of the linear village of Versam and the hamlets of Versam-Station, Arezen, Calörtsch and Sculms.

== Demographics ==
Safiental has a population (as of December 2020) of 937. As of 2015, 5.6% of the population are resident foreign nationals. Over the last 5 years (2010-2015) the population has changed at a rate of -5.49%. The birth rate in the municipality, in 2015, was 15.6, while the death rate was 7.8 per thousand residents.

As of 2015, children and teenagers (0–19 years old) make up 21.8% of the population, while adults (20–64 years old) are 54.7% of the population and seniors (over 64 years old) make up 23.5%. In 2015 there were 380 single residents, 406 people who were married or in a civil partnership, 55 widows or widowers and 55 divorced residents.

In 2015 there were 359 private households in Safiental with an average household size of 2.49 persons. In 2015 about 60.5% of all buildings in the municipality were single family homes, which is greater than the percentage in the canton (49.4%) and about the same as the percentage nationally (57.4%). In 2014 the rate of construction of new housing units per 1000 residents was 3.35. The vacancy rate for the municipality, in 2016, was 0.8%.

== Historic Population ==
The historical population is given in the following chart:

== Heritage sites of national significance ==
The Türelihus and the Haus Joos with attached barn in Valendas and the Swiss Reformed Church in Tenna are listed as Swiss heritage sites of national significance.

The Türelihus (Türeli House) is located in the center of Valendas and is one of the most historically valuable houses in the village. The interior contains many of the original furnishings from the Renaissance and Baroque eras. The original building was constructed in 1485. In 1554 it was expanded, this expansion was known as the Renaissance phase, with a spiral staircase within a tower and a stable was added to the north side. In 1775 it was renovated in the baroque style. The four-story building was abandoned for many years and had begun to decay. In 1994, the first attempt to renovate this building ended with only the addition of a temporary roof.

The oldest part of the Haus Joos may date to about 1300. The attached barn has a date of 1572 carved into it. However, the building is currently in poor condition and has not been used for a number of years.

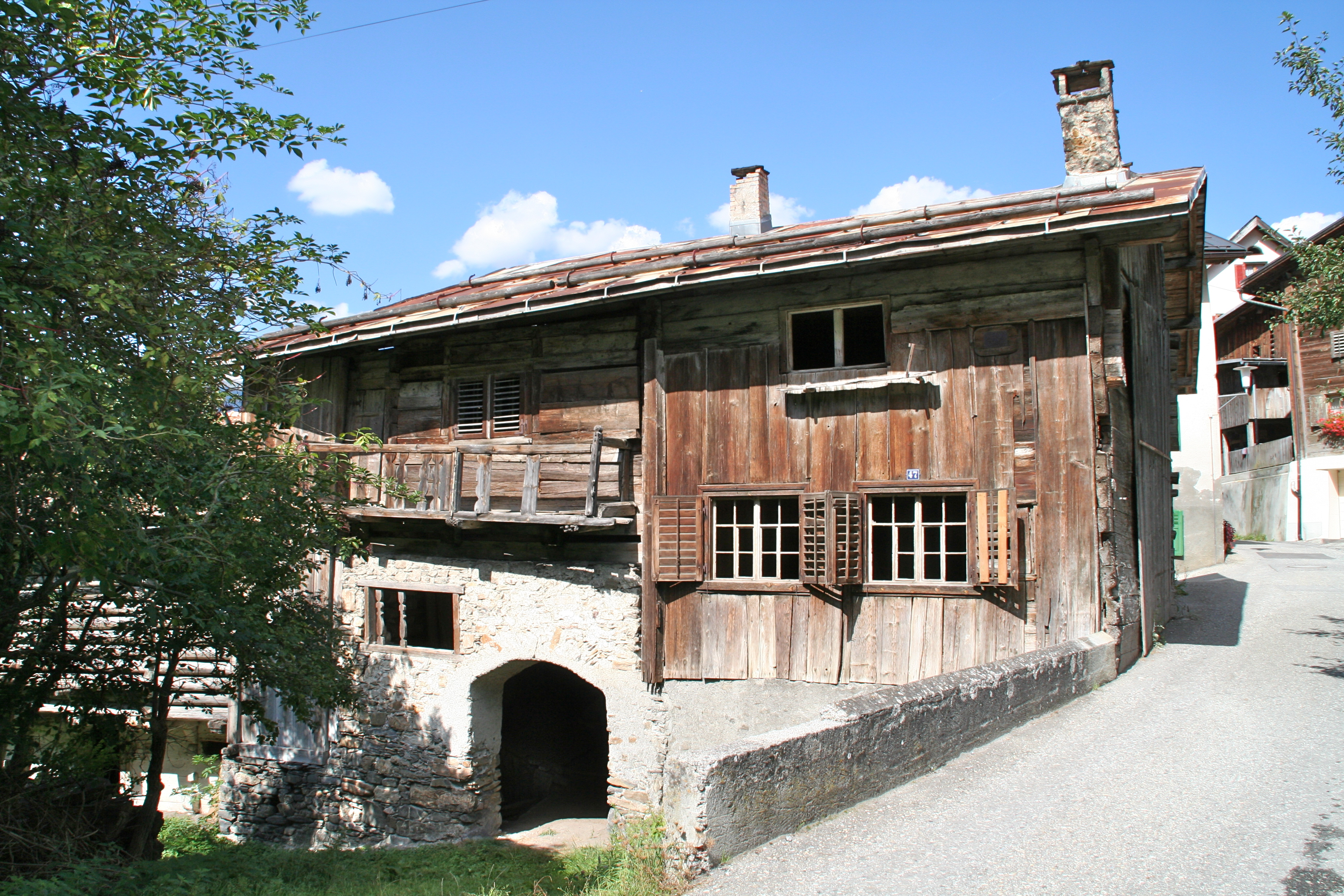
Joos House with Stables in Fraissa hamlet

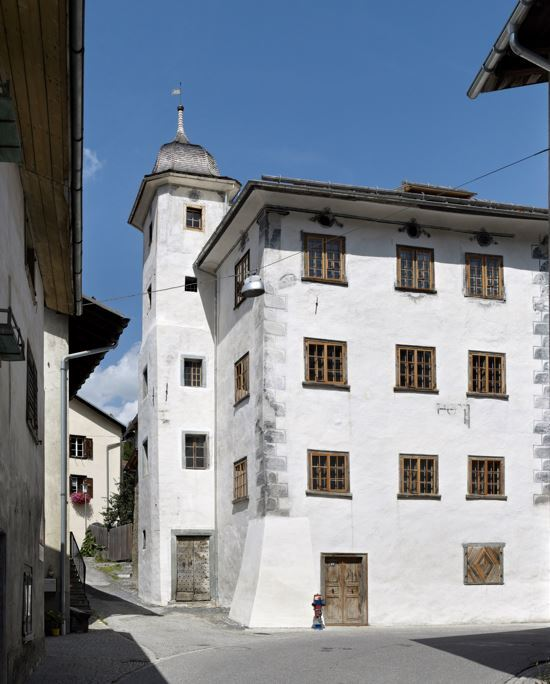
Türelihus in Valendas

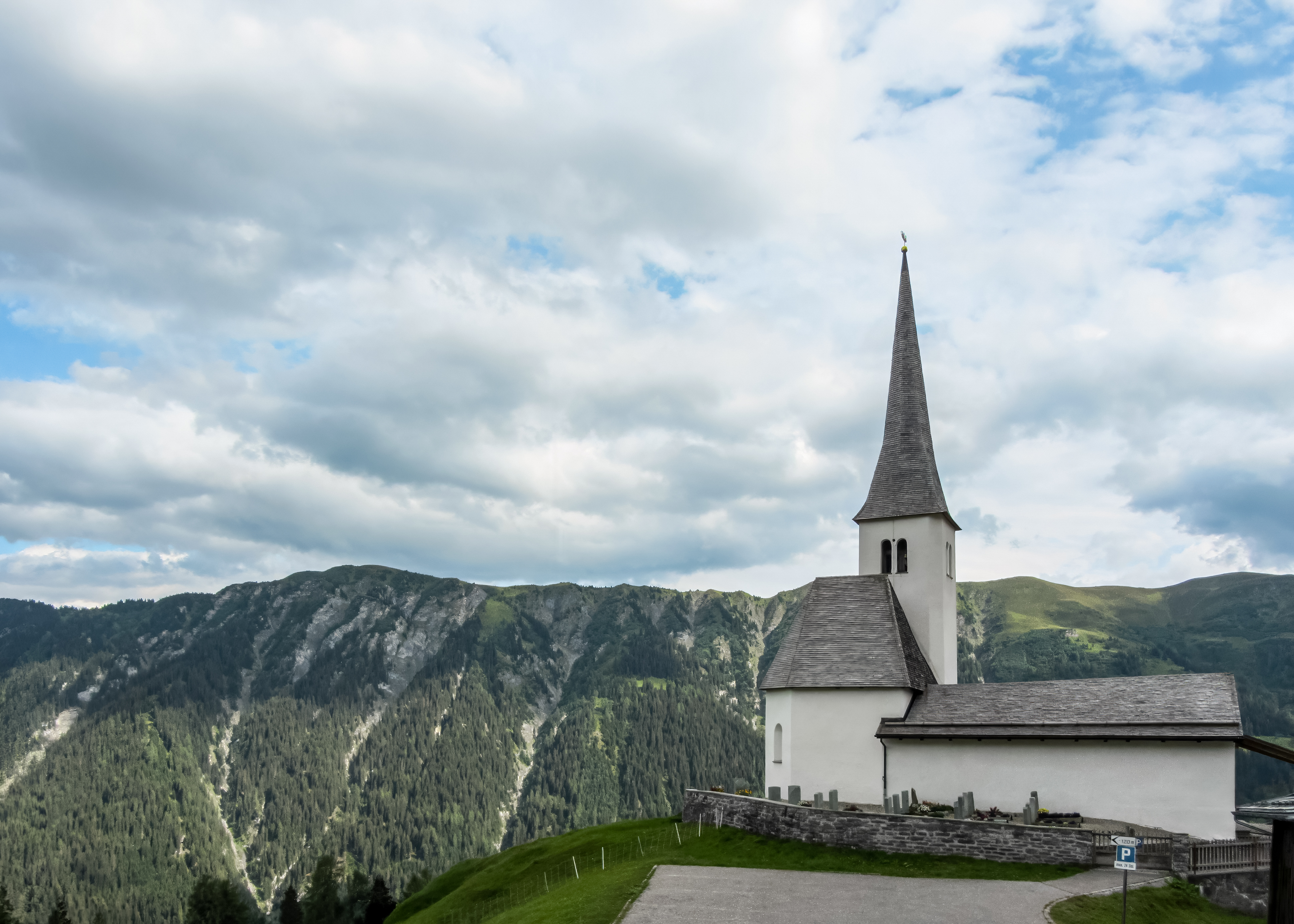
Swiss Reformed Church in Tenna

== Transport ==
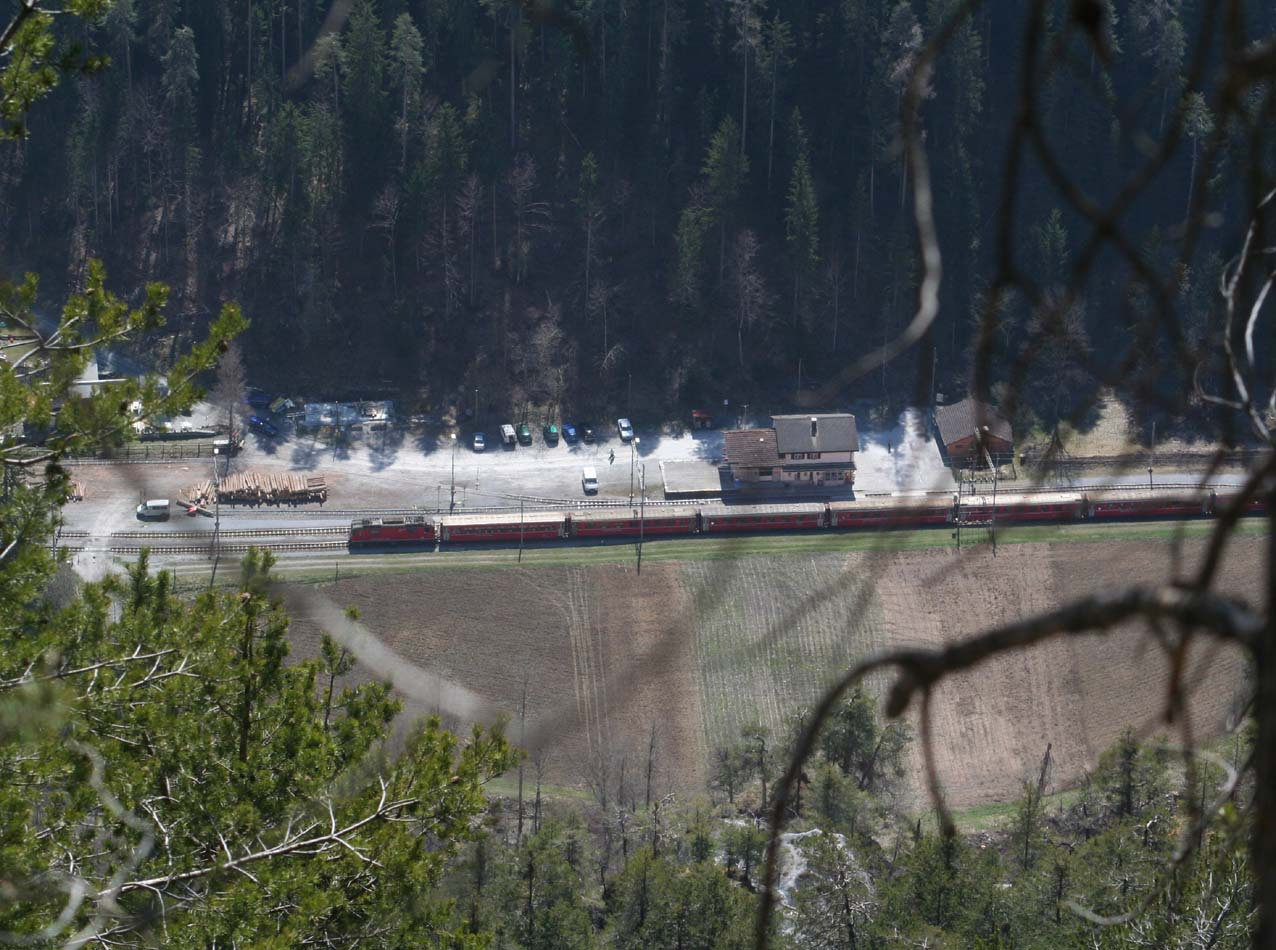
Versam-Safien station on the valley floor

The municipality is served by two railway stations on the line of the Rhaetian Railway that links Chur and Disentis, these being Versam-Safien and Valendas-Sagogn.

Versam-Safien station is located some 250 metres (820 ft) lower than the village of Versam, and about 3.6 km (2.2 mi) to the north. To reach the village directly, a PostAuto bus service provides a connection, which also serves Thalkirch and Tenna.

Similarly, Valendas-Sagogn station lies some 120 metres (390 ft) below and 1.2 kilometres (0.75 mi) distant from the village of Valendas and is also connected by a PostAuto bus service.

== In popular culture ==
The 2012 feature film The Hour of Living is largely set in Safiental, with especially Grossalp Piggamad, as well as Z'hinderst, Bodaälpli and Alperschällihorn with its Gletscherseeli all serving as prominent locations.
