= Tartar, Switzerland =

Tartar
- Former municipality
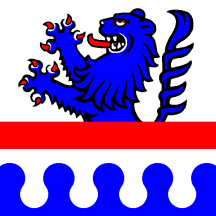
- Flag Coat of arms
- Location of Tartar
- Location within Switzerland Location within Canton of Graubünden
- Coordinates: 46°43′N 9°25′E
- Country: Switzerland
- Canton: Graubünden
- District: Hinterrhein

Area
  - Total: 1.58 km^{2} (0.61 sq mi)
- Elevation: 995 m (3,264 ft)

Population (December 2007)
  - Total: 168
  - Density: 106/km^{2} (275/sq mi)
- Time zone: UTC+01:00 (CET)
  - Summer (DST): UTC+02:00 (CEST)
- Postal code: 7422
- SFOS number: 3667
- ISO 3166 code: CH-GR
- Surrounded by: Cazis, Masein, Portein, Präz, Sarn
- Website: www.tartar.ch

Tartar is a former municipality in the district of Hinterrhein in the Swiss canton of Graubünden. On 1 January 2010 the municipalities of Portein, Präz, Sarn and Tartar merged into the municipality of Cazis.

== History ==
Tartar is first mentioned around 1290-98 as in Tartere.

== Geography ==
Tartar had an area, as of 2006, of 1.6 km^{2} (0.62 sq mi). Of this area, 51.9% is used for agricultural purposes, while 38% is forested. Of the rest of the land, 8.2% is settled (buildings or roads) and the remainder (1.9%) is non-productive (rivers, glaciers or mountains).

The former municipality is located in the Thusis sub-district, of the Hinterrhein district. Tartar is located on the lower Heinzenberg mountains at an elevation of 994 m (3,261 ft). It consists of the haufendorf (an irregular, unplanned and quite closely packed village, built around a central square) village of Tartar made up of the sections of Oberschauenberg, Valeina, Pro Biet and the farm house group of Foppa. The municipalities of Portein, Präz, Sarn, and Tartar merged on 1 January 2010 into the municipality of Cazis.

== Demographics ==
Tartar had a population (as of 2007) of 168, of which 4.8% are foreign nationals. Over the last 10 years the population has decreased at a rate of -4%.

As of 2000, the gender distribution of the population was 50.6% male and 49.4% female. The age distribution, as of 2000, in Tartar is; 17 people or 10.8% of the population are between 0 and 9 years old. 14 people or 8.9% are 10 to 14, and 7 people or 4.4% are 15 to 19. Of the adult population, 14 people or 8.9% of the population are between 20 and 29 years old. 21 people or 13.3% are 30 to 39, 23 people or 14.6% are 40 to 49, and 22 people or 13.9% are 50 to 59. The senior population distribution is 20 people or 12.7% of the population are between 60 and 69 years old, 10 people or 6.3% are 70 to 79, there are 8 people or 5.1% who are 80 to 89, and there are 2 people or 1.3% who are 90 to 99.

In the 2007 federal election the most popular party was the SVP which received 53.4% of the vote. The next three most popular parties were the SPS (16.8%), the CVP (15.3%) and the FDP (14.5%).

In Tartar about 67.4% of the population (between age 25-64) have completed either non-mandatory upper secondary education or additional higher education (either University or a Fachhochschule).

Tartar has an unemployment rate of 1.05%. As of 2005, there were 7 people employed in the primary economic sector and about 2 businesses involved in this sector. 2 people are employed in the secondary sector and there is 1 business in this sector. 9 people are employed in the tertiary sector, with 3 businesses in this sector.

The historical population is given in the following table:

year	population
1808	108
1850	170
1900	146
1920	206
1950	188
2000	158

== Languages ==
Nearly all of the population (as of 2000) speaks German, with Italian and Romansh spoken by three and one person, respectively.

Languages in Tartar
Languages	Census 1980		Census 1990		Census 2000	
Languages	Number	Percent	Number	Percent	Number	Percent
German	98	93.3%	144	89.4%	154	97.5%
Romanish	6	5.7%	4	2.5%	1	0.6%
Italian	0	0.0%	4	2.5%	3	1.9%
Population	105	100%	161	100%	158	100%
