= Masein =

- Municipality
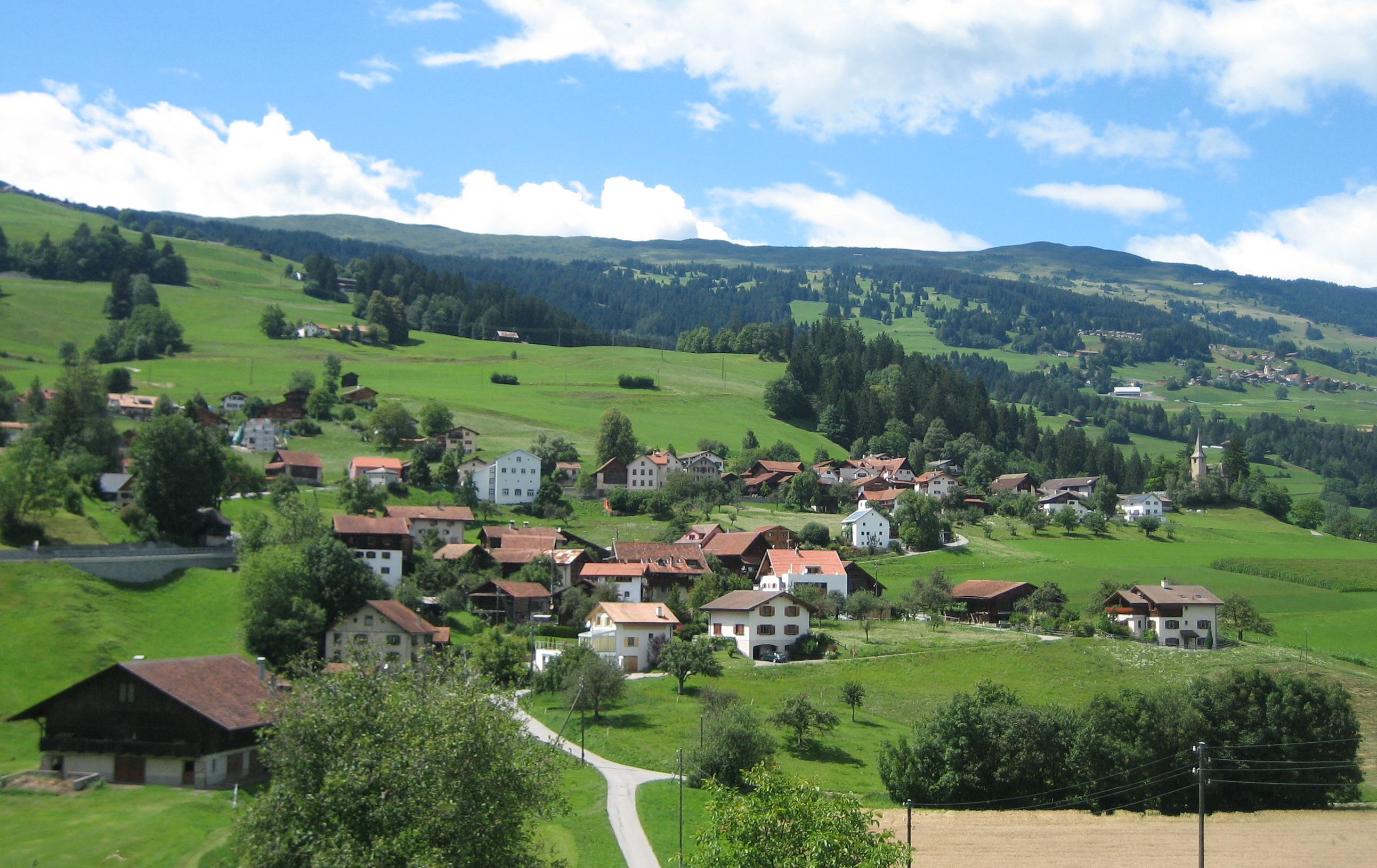

- Flag Coat of arms
- Location of Masein
- Location within Switzerland Location within Canton of Grisons
- Coordinates: 46°42′N 9°25′E
- Country: Switzerland
- Canton: Grisons
- District: Viamala

Area
  - Total: 4.2 km^{2} (1.6 sq mi)
- Elevation: 865 m (2,838 ft)

Population (December 2020)
  - Total: 500
  - Density: 120/km^{2} (310/sq mi)
- Time zone: UTC+01:00 (CET)
  - Summer (DST): UTC+02:00 (CEST)
- Postal code: 7425
- SFOS number: 3663
- ISO 3166 code: CH-GR
- Surrounded by: Cazis, Flerden, Portein, Tartar, Thusis, Urmein
- Website: www.masein.ch

Masein (Romansh: Masagn) is a municipality in the Viamala Region in the Swiss canton of the Grisons.

== History ==
Masein is first mentioned in 1156 as de Medezenu.

== Geography ==
Masein has an area, as of 2006, of 4.2 km^{2} (1.6 sq mi). Of this area, 38.4% is used for agricultural purposes, while 52% is forested. Of the rest of the land, 6% is settled (buildings or roads) and the remainder (3.6%) is non-productive (rivers, glaciers or mountains).

Before 2017, the municipality was located in the Thusis sub-district, of the Hinterrhein district, after 2017 it was part of the Viamala Region. It is located on the lower Heinzenberg and consists of the two settlements of Ober- and Unter-Masein and the hamlets of Dalaus, Cresta und Lochmüli.

== Demographics ==
Masein has a population (as of 31 December 2020) of 500. As of 2008, 2.8% of the population was made up of foreign nationals. Over the last 10 years the population has grown at a rate of 2.9%.

As of 2000, the gender distribution of the population was 51.0% male and 49.0% female. The age distribution, as of 2000, in Masein is; 46 people or 12.6% of the population are between 0 and 9 years old. 29 people or 7.9% are 10 to 14, and 37 people or 10.1% are 15 to 19. Of the adult population, 38 people or 10.4% of the population are between 20 and 29 years old. 60 people or 16.4% are 30 to 39, 70 people or 19.1% are 40 to 49, and 47 people or 12.8% are 50 to 59. The senior population distribution is 21 people or 5.7% of the population are between 60 and 69 years old, 12 people or 3.3% are 70 to 79, there are 5 people or 1.4% who are 80 to 89, and there is 1 person who is 90 to 99.

In the 2007 federal election the most popular party was the SVP which received 37.7% of the vote. The next three most popular parties were the SPS (33.6%), the FDP (14.8%) and the CVP (11.4%).

The entire Swiss population is generally well educated. In Masein about 80.4% of the population (between age 25-64) have completed either non-mandatory upper secondary education or additional higher education (either university or a Fachhochschule).

Masein has an unemployment rate of 1.21%. As of 2005, there were 32 people employed in the primary economic sector and about 11 businesses involved in this sector. 3 people are employed in the secondary sector and there are 2 businesses in this sector. 47 people are employed in the tertiary sector, with 11 businesses in this sector.

The historical population is given in the following table:

year	population
1803	198
1850	282
1900	228
1950	270
2000	366
2010	409

== Languages ==
Most of the population (as of 2000) speaks German (92.6%), with Romansh being second most common ( 3.3%) and Dutch being third ( 1.4%).

Languages in Masein
Languages	Census 1980		Census 1990		Census 2000	
Languages	Number	Percent	Number	Percent	Number	Percent
German	188	82.82%	306	91.89%	339	92.62%
Romanish	26	11.45%	15	4.50%	12	3.28%
Italian	6	2.64%	3	0.90%	1	0.27%
Population	227	100%	333	100%	366	100%
