= Portein =

- Former municipality
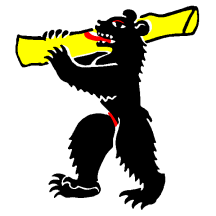
- Flag Coat of arms
- Location of Portein
- Location within Switzerland Location within Canton of Graubünden
- Coordinates: 46°43′N 9°24′E
- Country: Switzerland
- Canton: Graubünden
- District: Hinterrhein

Area
  - Total: 3.42 km^{2} (1.32 sq mi)
- Elevation: 1,167 m (3,829 ft)

Population (December 2007)
  - Total: 22
  - Density: 6.4/km^{2} (17/sq mi)
- Time zone: UTC+01:00 (CET)
  - Summer (DST): UTC+02:00 (CEST)
- Postal code: 7423
- SFOS number: 3664
- ISO 3166 code: CH-GR
- Surrounded by: Flerden, Masein, Safien, Sarn, Tartar
- Website: SFSO statistics

Portein (Romansh: Purtagn) was a municipality in the district of Hinterrhein in the Swiss canton of Graubünden. On 1 January 2010 the municipalities of Portein, Präz, Sarn and Tartar merged into the municipality of Cazis.

== Coat of Arms ==
In Silver (white) an upright, red armed black bear carrying a gold tree trunk. This golden tree trunk carrying bear is attributed to Saint Gall, the patron saint of the Reformed Portein village church.

== History ==
Portein is first mentioned in 1378 as Purteyn.

== Geography ==
Portein has an area, as of 2006, of 3.4 km^{2} (1.3 sq mi). Of this area, 58.8% is used for agricultural purposes, while 31% is forested. Of the rest of the land, 2% is settled (buildings or roads) and the remainder (8.2%) is non-productive (rivers, glaciers or mountains).

The municipality is located in the Thusis sub-district, of the Hinterrhein district in the Heinzenberg. It is located on a ridge between the Porteiner Tobel and the Val da la Malanotg at an altitude of 1,178 m (3,865 ft). It consists of the hamlet-like Haufendorf (an irregular, unplanned and quite closely packed village, built around a central square) village of Portein. The municipalities of Portein, Präz, Sarn, and Tartar merged on 1 January 2010 into Cazis.

== Demographics ==
Portein has a population (as of 2007) of 22, of which 3 are foreign nationals. Over the last 10 years the population has stayed stable.

As of 2000, the gender distribution of the population was 40.9% male and 59.1% female. The age distribution, as of 2000, in Portein is; 2 people or 7.7% of the population are between 0 and 9 years old. 3 people or 11.5% are 10 to 14, and 2 people or 7.7% are 15 to 19. Of the adult population, 1 person or 3.8% of the population is between 20 and 29 years old. 3 people or 11.5% are 30 to 39, 5 people or 19.2% are 40 to 49, and 3 people or 11.5% are 50 to 59. The senior population distribution is no one is between 60 and 69 years old, 2 people or 7.7% are 70 to 79, there are 4 people or 15.4% who are 80 to 89, and there is 1 person who is 90 to 99.

In the 2007 federal election the most popular party was the SVP which received 66.3% of the vote. The next three most popular parties were the FDP (26.3%), the SPS (6.3%) and the CVP (1.3%).

In Portein about 90.9% of the population (between age 25 and 64) have completed either non-mandatory upper secondary education or additional higher education (either University or a Fachhochschule).

Portein has an unemployment rate of 0%. As of 2005, there were 7 people employed in the primary economic sector and about 2 businesses involved in this sector. No one is employed in the secondary sector and there are no businesses in this sector. No one is employed in the tertiary sector, and there are no businesses in this sector in the village.

The historical population is given in the following table:

| year | population |
|---|---|
| 1808 | 48 |
| 1850 | 65 |
| 1900 | 30 |
| 1950 | 37 |
| 2000 | 26 |

=== Population ===
On 31 December 2001, Portein was the smallest municipality in Switzerland in terms of population, with a population of 22. By the end of 2003, however, the population grew to 23, losing that distinction. As of 2007 the smallest municipality was Corippo in Canton Ticino.

=== Language ===
Even though the municipality is in a Romansh-speaking area, it is now almost completely German-speaking. As of 2000 the entire population speaks German.
