= Präz =

- Former municipality
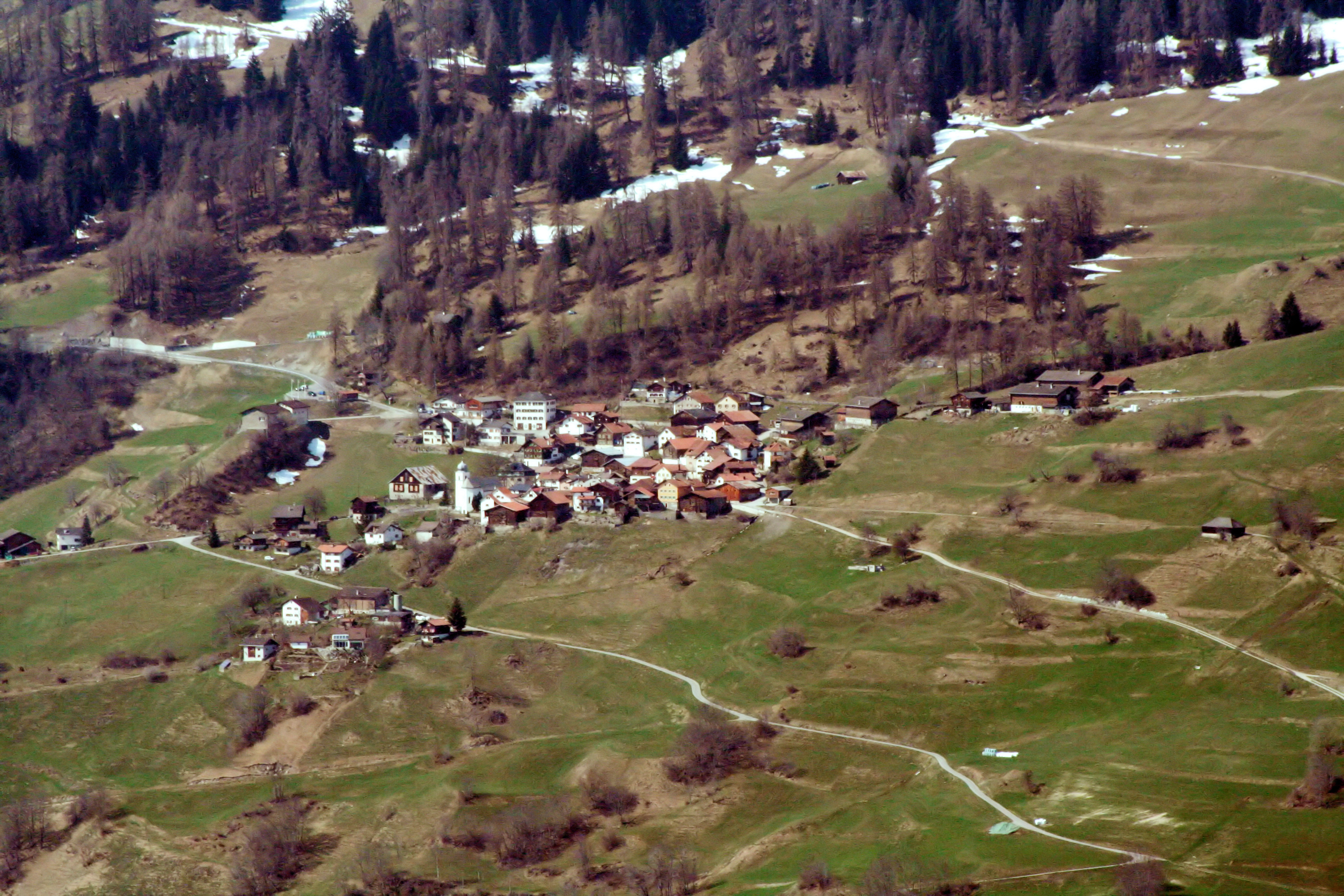
- Präz from the air

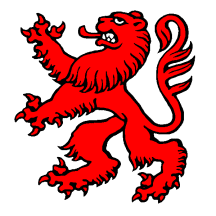
- Flag Coat of arms
- Location of Präz
- Location within Switzerland Location within Canton of Graubünden
- Coordinates: 46°44′N 9°24′E
- Country: Switzerland
- Canton: Graubünden
- District: Hinterrhein

Area
  - Total: 11.35 km^{2} (4.38 sq mi)
- Elevation: 1,200 m (3,900 ft)

Population (December 2007)
  - Total: 161
  - Density: 14.2/km^{2} (36.7/sq mi)
- Time zone: UTC+01:00 (CET)
  - Summer (DST): UTC+02:00 (CEST)
- Postal code: 7424
- SFOS number: 3665
- ISO 3166 code: CH-GR
- Surrounded by: Cazis, Rhäzüns, Safien, Sarn, Tartar, Versam
- Twin towns: Neerach (Switzerland)
- Website: www.praez.ch

Präz (Romansh: Preaz) was a municipality in the district of Hinterrhein in the Swiss canton of Graubünden. On 1 January 2010 the municipalities of Portein, Präz, Sarn and Tartar merged into the municipality of Cazis.

== History ==
Präz is first mentioned in 1290-98 as Pare(t)z.

== Geography ==
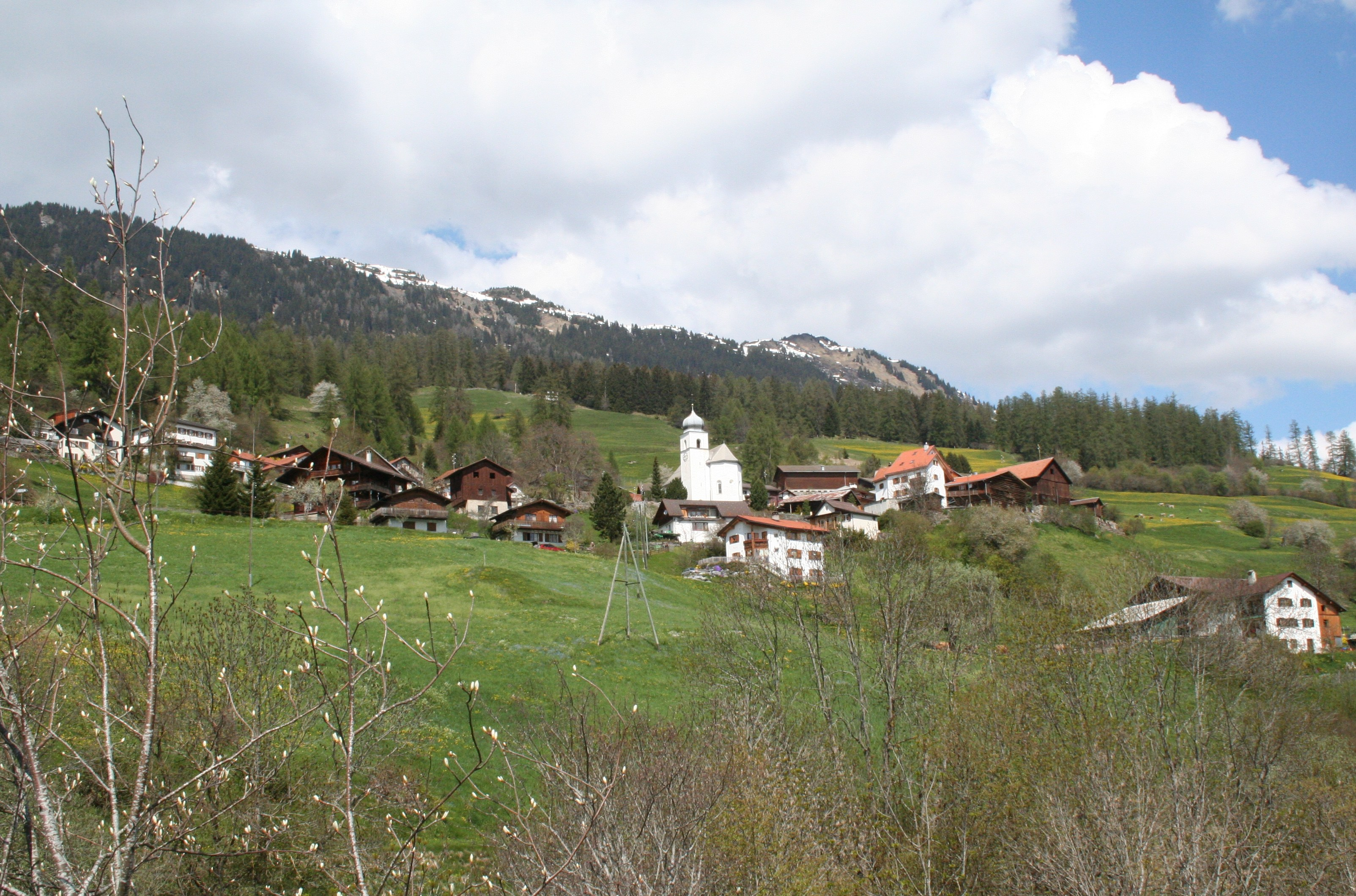
Präz village from downslope

Präz has an area, as of 2006, of 11.3 km^{2} (4.4 sq mi). Of this area, 45.3% is used for agricultural purposes, while 47.9% is forested. Of the rest of the land, 2.8% is settled (buildings or roads) and the remainder (4%) is non-productive (rivers, glaciers or mountains).

The municipality is located in the Thusis sub-district, of the Hinterrhein district and is located on the Heinzenberg mountains. It consists of the haufendorf (an irregular, unplanned and quite closely packed village, built around a central square) village of Präz and the hamlets of Dalin and Raschlinas as well as scattered farm houses. The municipalities of Portein, Präz, Sarn, and Tartar merged on 1 January 2010 into Cazis.

== Demographics ==
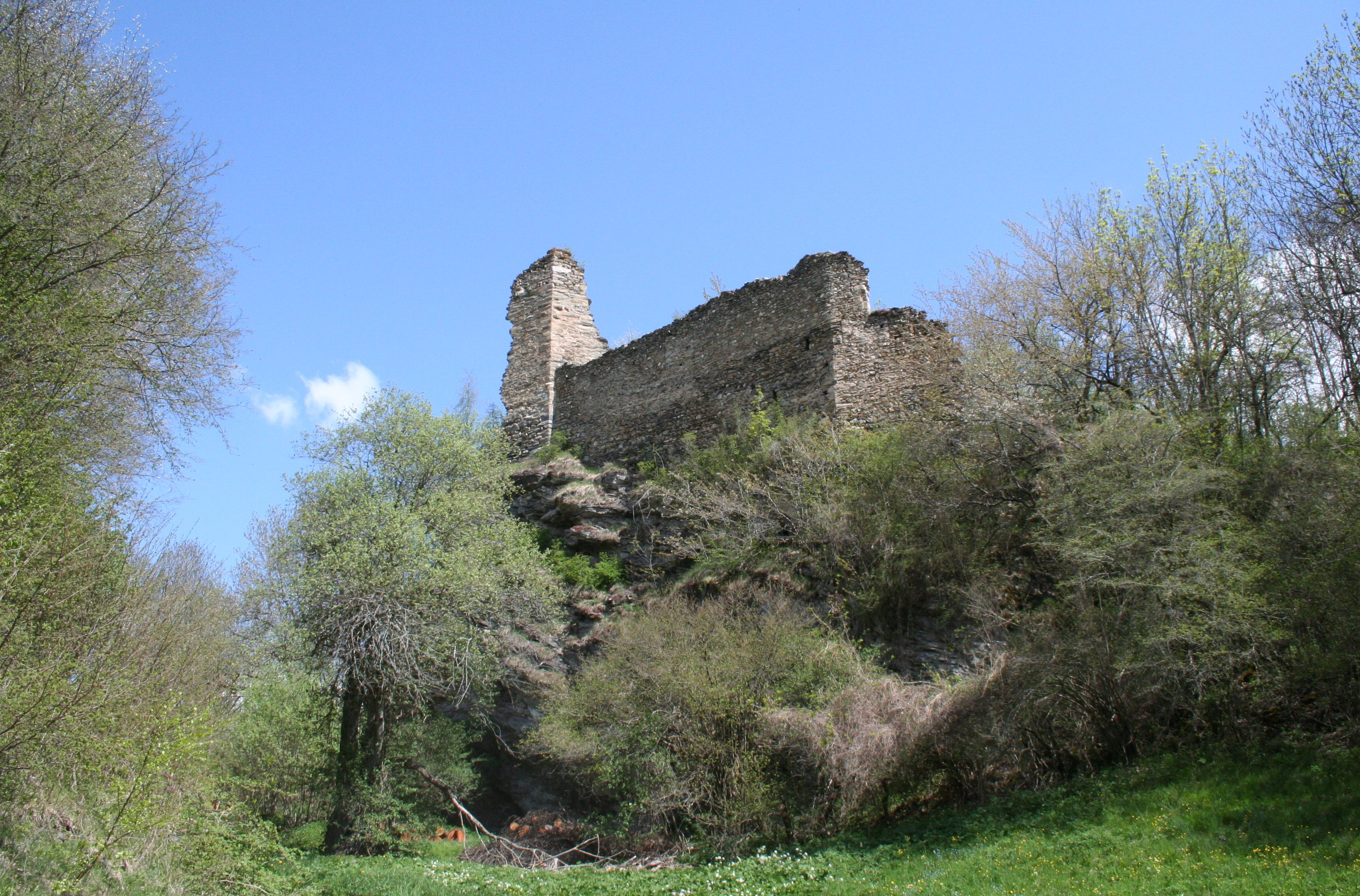
Castle Heinzenberg ruins

Präz has a population (as of 2007) of 161, of which 5.0% are foreign nationals. Over the last 10 years the population has decreased at a rate of -20.3%.

As of 2000, the gender distribution of the population was 48.4% male and 51.6% female. The age distribution, as of 2000, in Präz is; 29 people or 16.3% of the population are between 0 and 9 years old. 13 people or 7.3% are 10 to 14, and 9 people or 5.1% are 15 to 19. Of the adult population, 17 people or 9.6% of the population are between 20 and 29 years old. 33 people or 18.5% are 30 to 39, 21 people or 11.8% are 40 to 49, and 22 people or 12.4% are 50 to 59. The senior population distribution is 15 people or 8.4% of the population are between 60 and 69 years old, 12 people or 6.7% are 70 to 79, there are 5 people or 2.8% who are 80 to 89, and there are 2 people or 1.1% who are 90 to 99.

In the 2007 federal election the most popular party was the SVP which received 48% of the vote. The next three most popular parties were the SPS (24.6%), the FDP (17.3%) and the CVP (9.7%).

The entire Swiss population is generally well educated. In Präz about 70.5% of the population (between age 25-64) have completed either non-mandatory upper secondary education or additional higher education (either University or a Fachhochschule).

Präz has an unemployment rate of 0.82%. As of 2005, there were 45 people employed in the primary economic sector and about 18 businesses involved in this sector. 1 person is employed in the secondary sector and there is 1 business in this sector. 7 people are employed in the tertiary sector, with 5 businesses in this sector.

The historical population is given in the following table:

year	population
1803	286
1850	303
1900	201
1950	231
1980	148
2000	178

== Languages ==
Most of the population (as of 2000) speaks German (95.5%), with Romansh being second most common ( 2.8%) and Italian being third ( 0.6%). The Romansh population speaks the Sutsilvan dialect.

Languages in Präz
Languages	Census 1980		Census 1990		Census 2000	
Languages	Number	Percent	Number	Percent	Number	Percent
German	105	69.08%	132	91.03%	170	95.51%
Romanish	46	30.26%	10	6.90%	5	2.81%
Population	152	100%	145	100%	178	100%
