= Sarn, Switzerland =

Sarn
- Former municipality
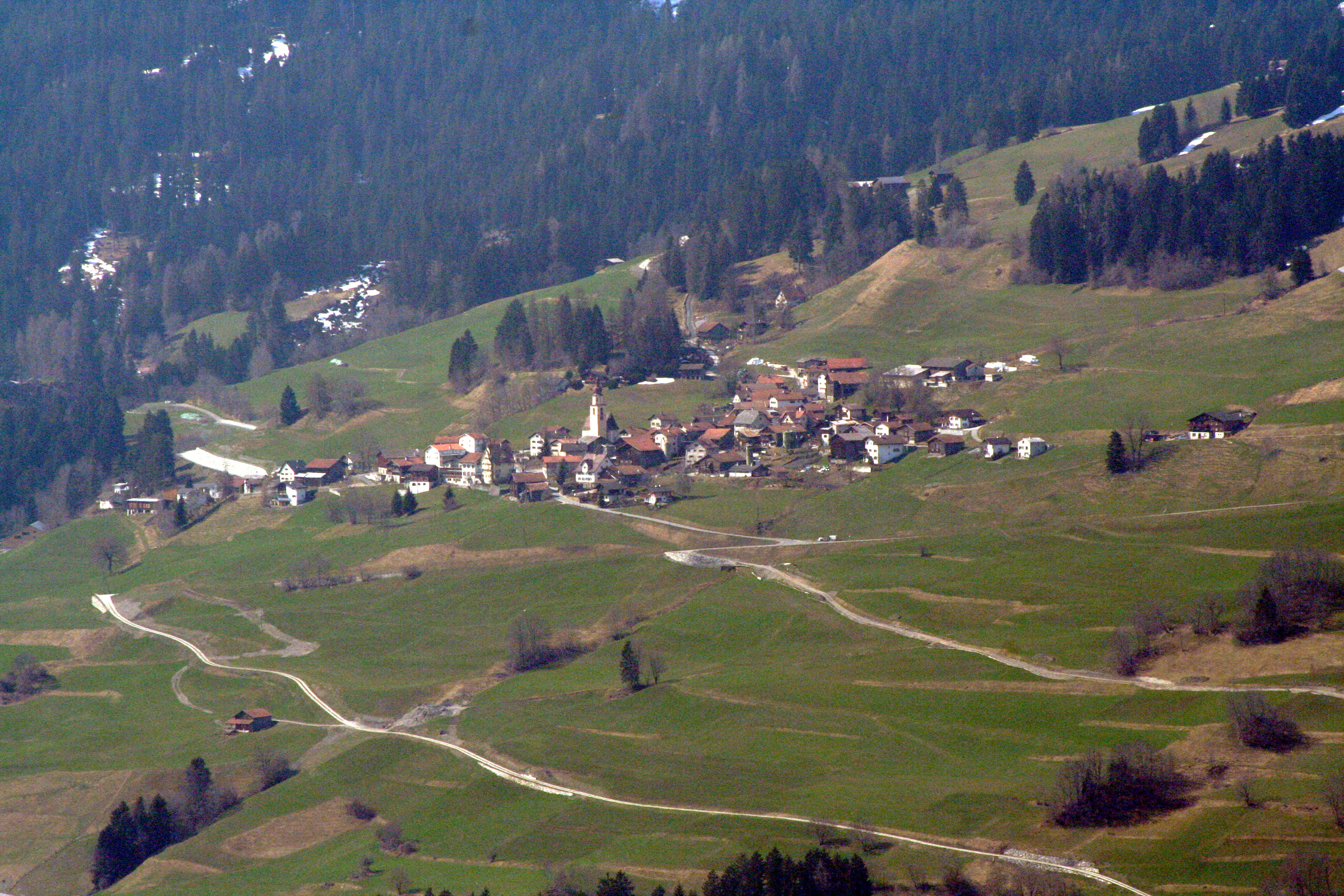
- Sarn from the air

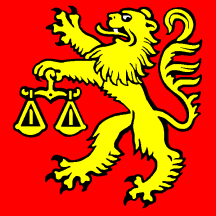
- Flag Coat of arms
- Location of Sarn
- Location within Switzerland Location within Canton of Graubünden
- Coordinates: 46°43′N 9°24′E
- Country: Switzerland
- Canton: Graubünden
- District: Hinterrhein

Area
  - Total: 7.6 km^{2} (2.9 sq mi)
- Elevation: 625 m (2,051 ft)

Population (December 2007)
  - Total: 142
  - Density: 19/km^{2} (48/sq mi)
- Time zone: UTC+01:00 (CET)
  - Summer (DST): UTC+02:00 (CEST)
- Postal code: 7423
- SFOS number: 3666
- ISO 3166 code: CH-GR
- Surrounded by: Portein, Präz, Safien, Tartar
- Website: www.sarn.ch

Sarn was a municipality in the district of Hinterrhein in the Swiss canton of Graubünden. On 1 January 2010 the municipalities of Portein, Präz, Sarn, and Tartar merged into the municipality of Cazis.

== History ==
Sarn is first mentioned in 1156 as Sarn.

== Geography ==
Sarn has an area, as of 2006, of 7.6 km^{2} (2.9 sq mi). Of this area, 78.9% is used for agricultural purposes, while 15.1% is forested. Of the rest of the land, 3.2% is settled (buildings or roads) and the remainder (2.8%) is non-productive (rivers, glaciers or mountains).

The municipality is located in the Thusis sub-district, of the Hinterrhein district. It consists of the haufendorf (an irregular, unplanned and quite closely packed village, built around a central square) village of Sarn on the Heinzenberg mountains. The municipalities of Portein, Präz, Sarn, and Tartar merged on 1 January 2010 into the municipality of Cazis.

== Demographics ==
Sarn has a population (as of 2007) of 142, of which 8.5% are foreign nationals. Over the last 10 years the population has decreased at a rate of -15.5%.

As of 2000, the gender distribution of the population was 51.4% male and 48.6% female. The age distribution, as of 2000, in Sarn is; 27 people or 17.0% of the population are between 0 and 9 years old. 14 people or 8.8% are 10 to 14, and 9 people or 5.7% are 15 to 19. Of the adult population, 8 people or 5.0% of the population are between 20 and 29 years old. 25 people or 15.7% are 30 to 39, 26 people or 16.4% are 40 to 49, and 16 people or 10.1% are 50 to 59. The senior population distribution is 18 people or 11.3% of the population are between 60 and 69 years old, 14 people or 8.8% are 70 to 79, there are 2 people or 1.3% who are 80 to 89.

In the 2007 federal election the most popular party was the SVP which received 51.5% of the vote. The next three most popular parties were the FDP (18.1%), the FDP (18.1%) and the CVP (11.7%).

The entire Swiss population is generally well educated. In Sarn about 71% of the population (between age 25-64) have completed either non-mandatory upper secondary education or additional higher education (either University or a Fachhochschule).

Sarn has an unemployment rate of 0%. As of 2005, there were 39 people employed in the primary economic sector and about 12 businesses involved in this sector. 10 people are employed in the secondary sector and there is 1 business in this sector. 7 people are employed in the tertiary sector, with 6 businesses in this sector.

The historical population is given in the following table:

year	population
1850	259
1900	150
1950	168
2000	159

== Languages ==
Most of the population (as of 2000) speaks German (97.5%), with Italian being second most common ( 1.9%) and English being third ( 0.6%).

Languages in Sarn
Languages	Census 1980		Census 1990		Census 2000	
Languages	Number	Percent	Number	Percent	Number	Percent
German	115	89.15%	144	97.30%	155	97.48%
Romanish	11	8.53%	4	2.70%	0	0.00%
Italian	3	2.33%	0	0.00%	3	1.94%
Population	129	100%	148	100%	159	100%
