= Safien =

- Former municipality
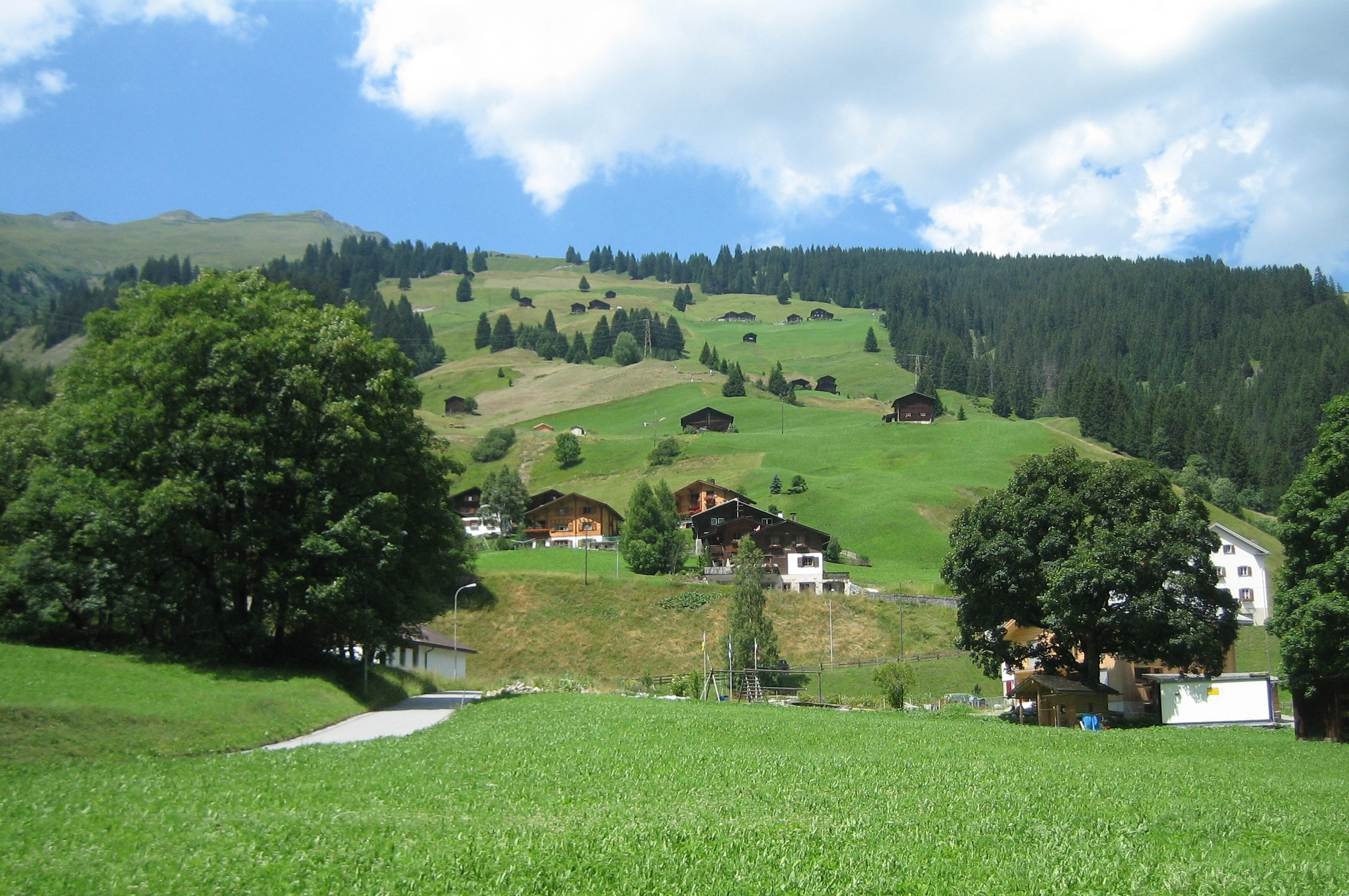
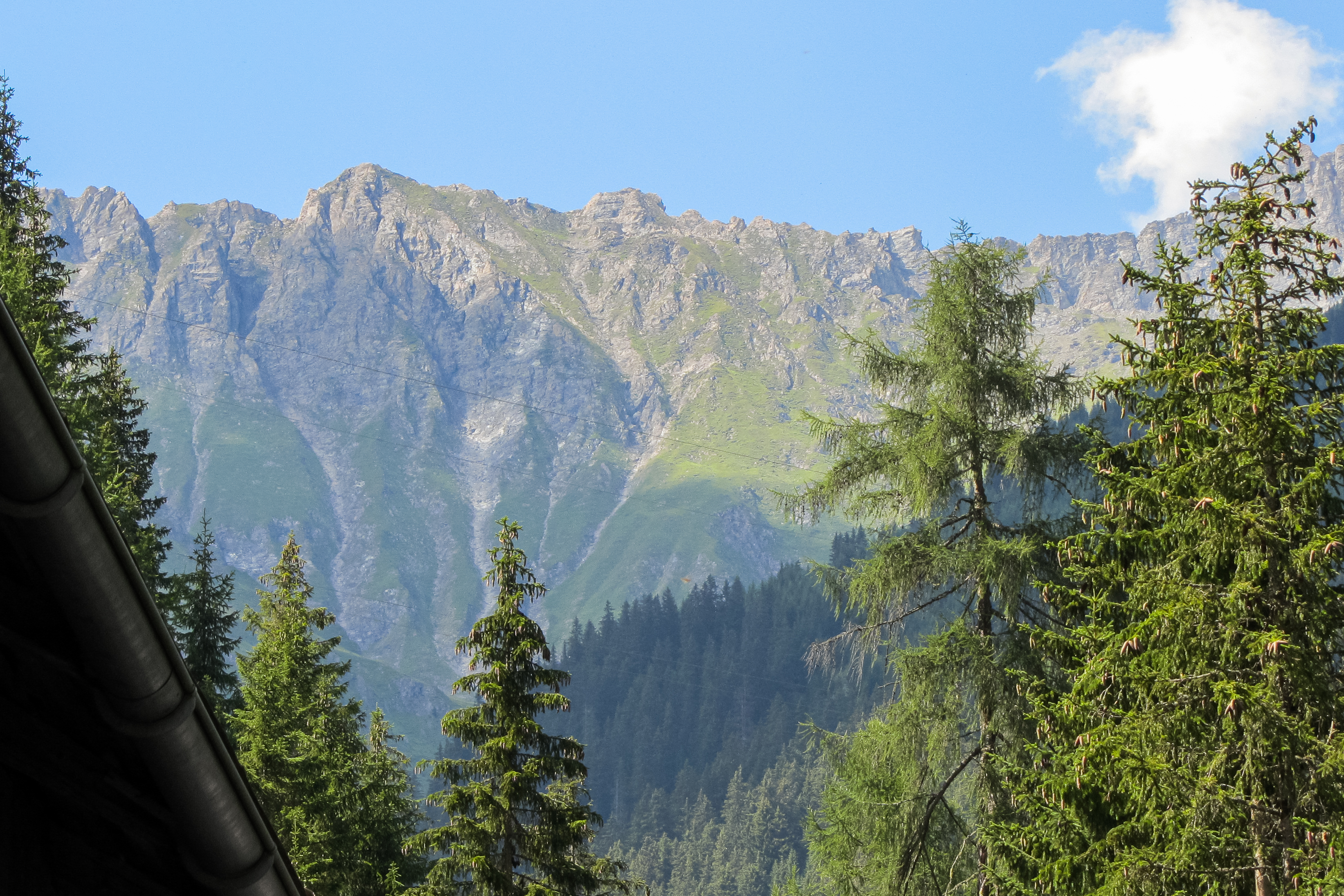
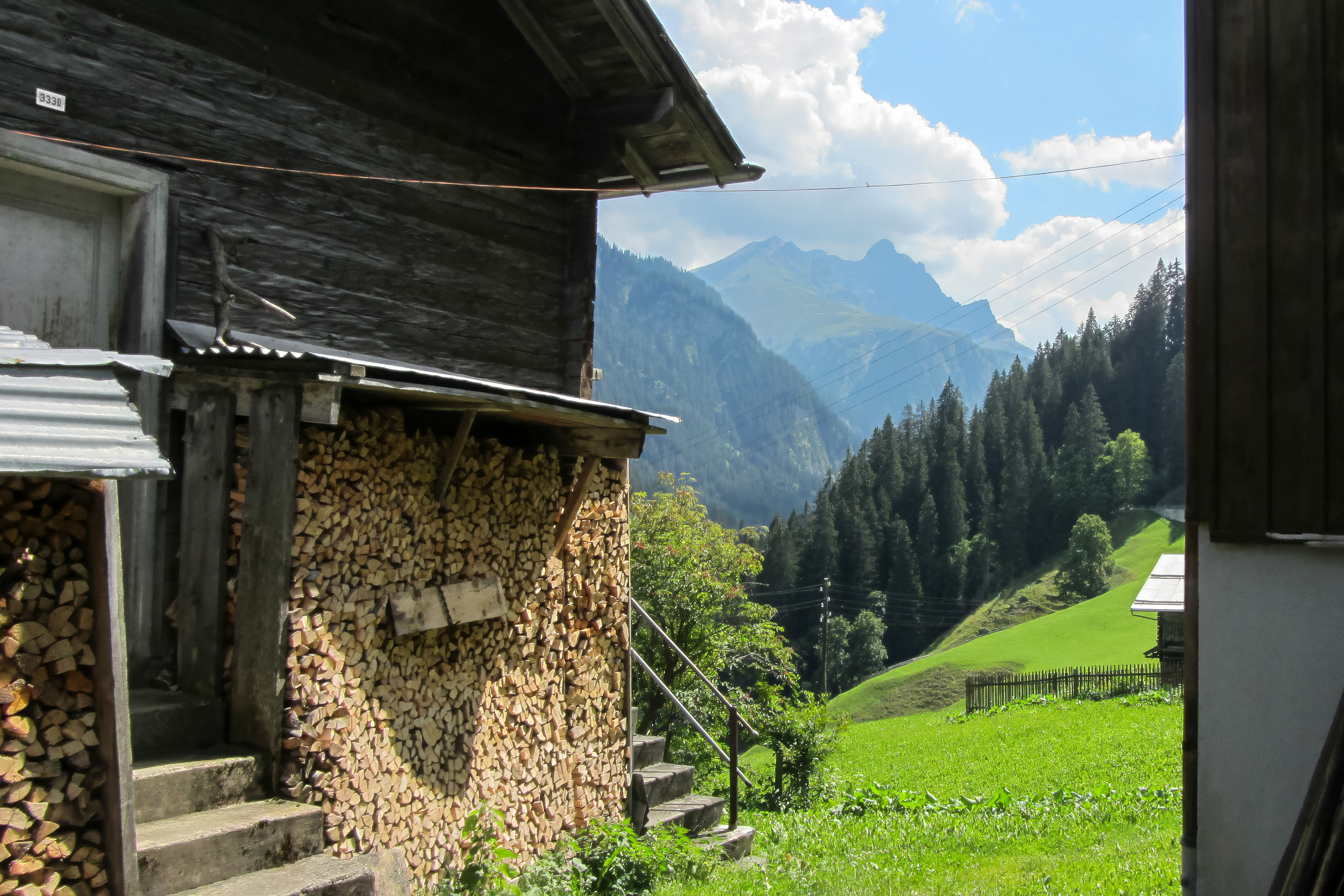

- Flag Coat of arms
- Location of Safien
- Location within Switzerland Location within Canton of Graubünden
- Coordinates: 46°40′N 9°18′E
- Country: Switzerland
- Canton: Graubünden
- District: Surselva

Area
  - Total: 100.6 km^{2} (38.8 sq mi)
- Elevation: 1,315 m (4,314 ft)

Population (Dec 2011)
  - Total: 294
  - Density: 2.92/km^{2} (7.57/sq mi)
- Time zone: UTC+01:00 (CET)
  - Summer (DST): UTC+02:00 (CEST)
- Postal code: 7107
- SFOS number: 3651
- ISO 3166 code: CH-GR
- Surrounded by: Casti-Wergenstein, Duvin, Flerden, Mathon, Nufenen, Pitasch, Portein, Präz, Riein, Sankt Martin, Sarn, Splügen, Sufers, Tenna, Tschappina, Vals
- Twin towns: Bettingen (Switzerland)
- Website: www.safien.ch

Safien is a former municipality in the district of Surselva in the Swiss canton of Graubünden. The municipalities of Valendas, Versam, Safien and Tenna merged on 1 January 2013 into the new municipality of Safiental.

== History ==
Safien is first mentioned in 1219 as Stosavia.

== Geography ==
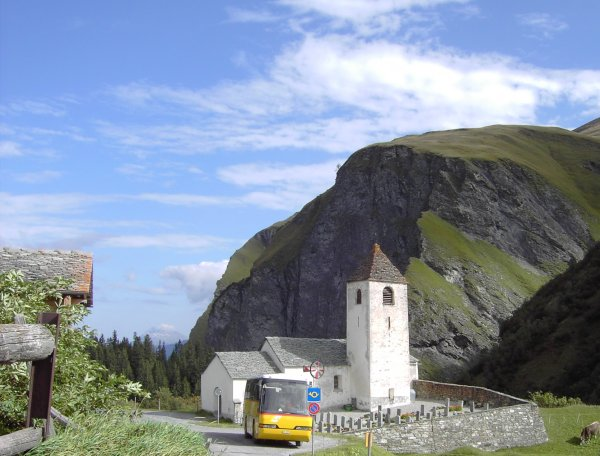
Thalkirch church, Safien

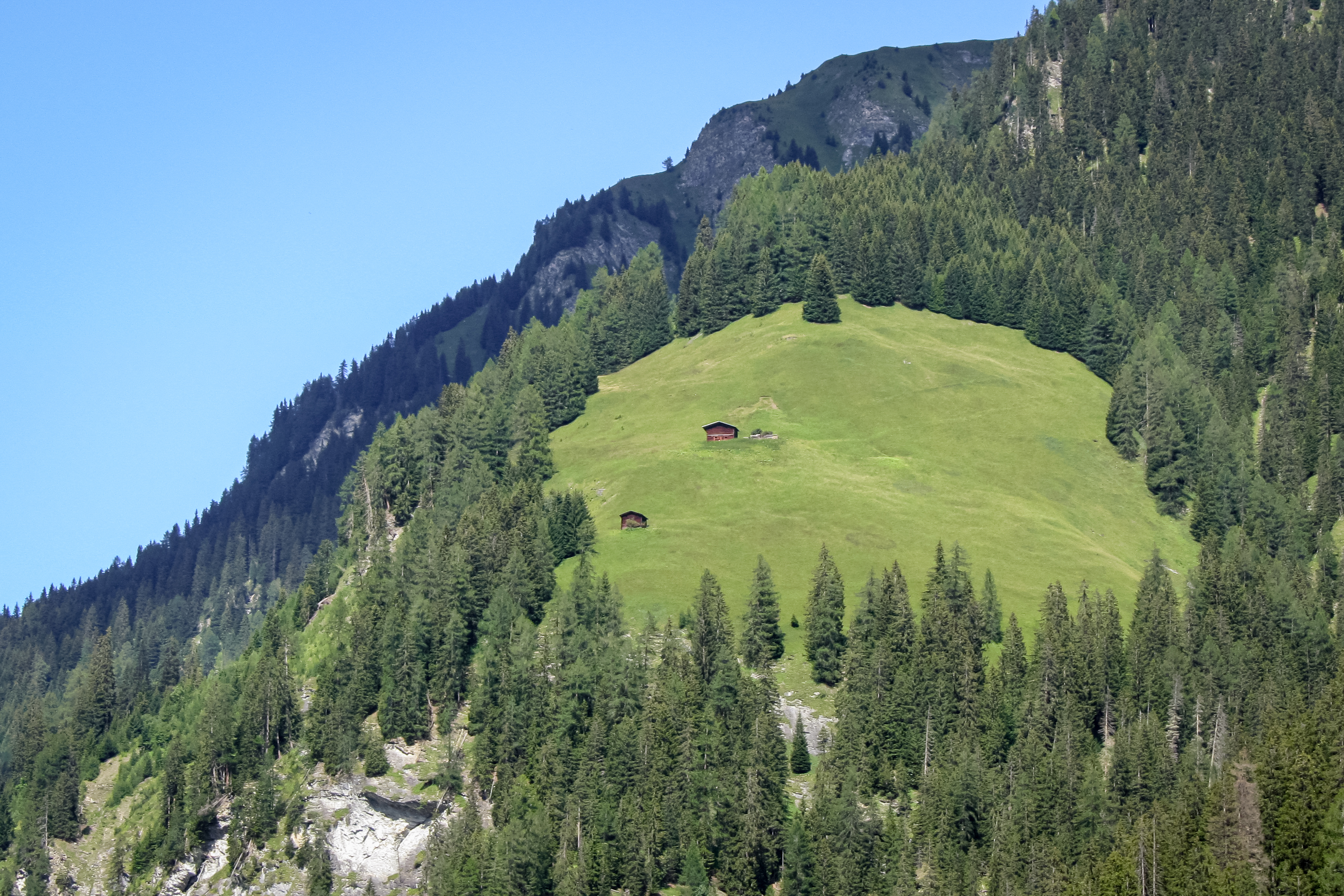
Mountain huts in Safien

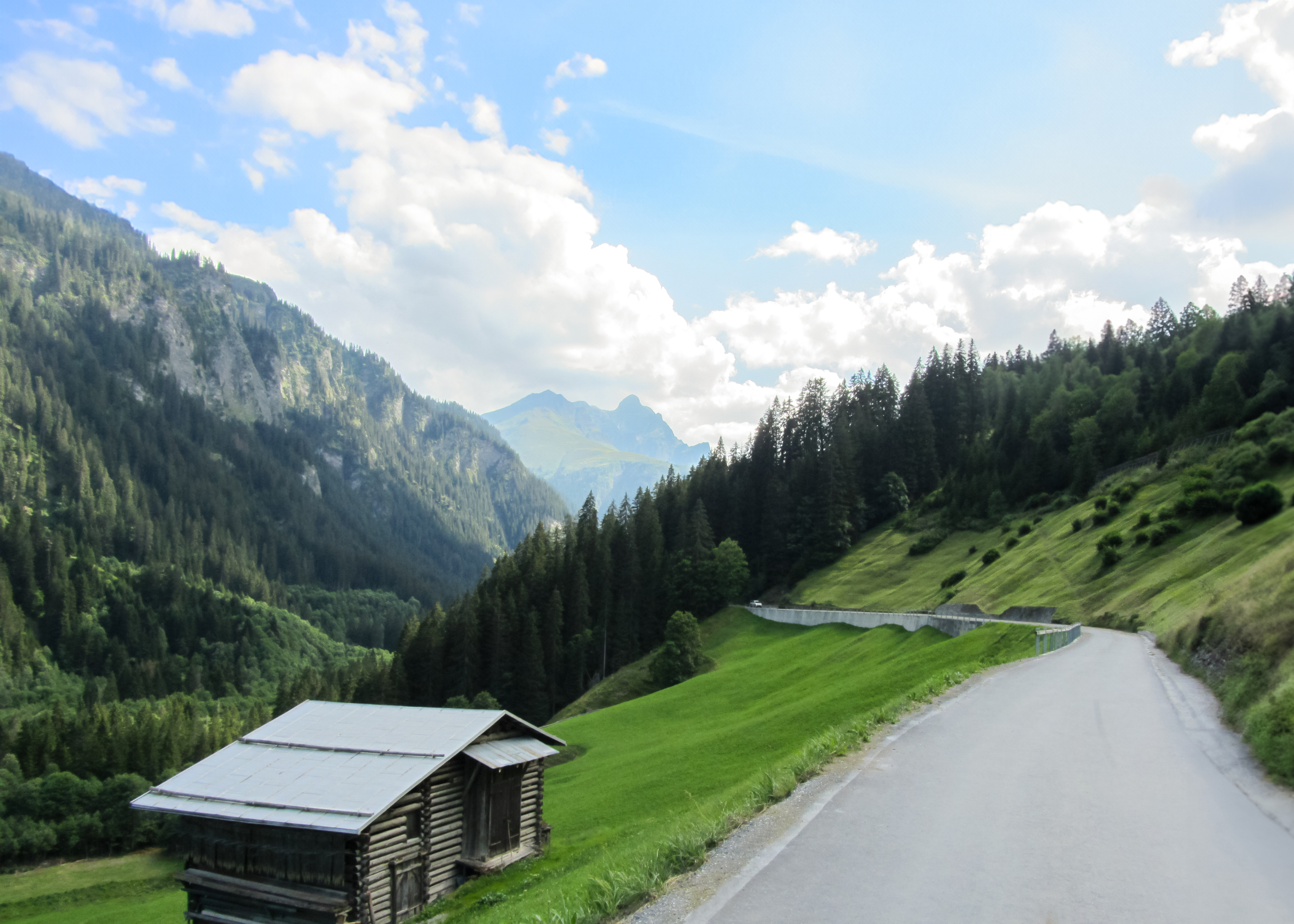
Farm shed on Safierstrasse

Safien had an area, as of 2006, of 100.6 km^{2} (38.8 sq mi). Of this area, 45.6% is used for agricultural purposes, while 18.2% is forested. Of the rest of the land, 0.8% is settled (buildings or roads) and the remainder (35.4%) is non-productive (rivers, glaciers or mountains).

The former municipality was the capital of the Safien sub-district of the Surselva district in the mid and upper Safien valley. The only other municipality in the sub-district was Tenna, which occupied the lower Safien valley. The valley is drained by the Rabiusa river.

The former municipality consists of the village of Safien-Platz (elevation: 1,350 m (4,430 ft)) and scattered hamlets and single farm houses throughout the valley.

== Coat of arms ==
The blazon of the municipal coat of arms is Gules a Cross gyronny Argent and Sable It is based on the simple design of the sub-district, with different colors.

== Demographics ==
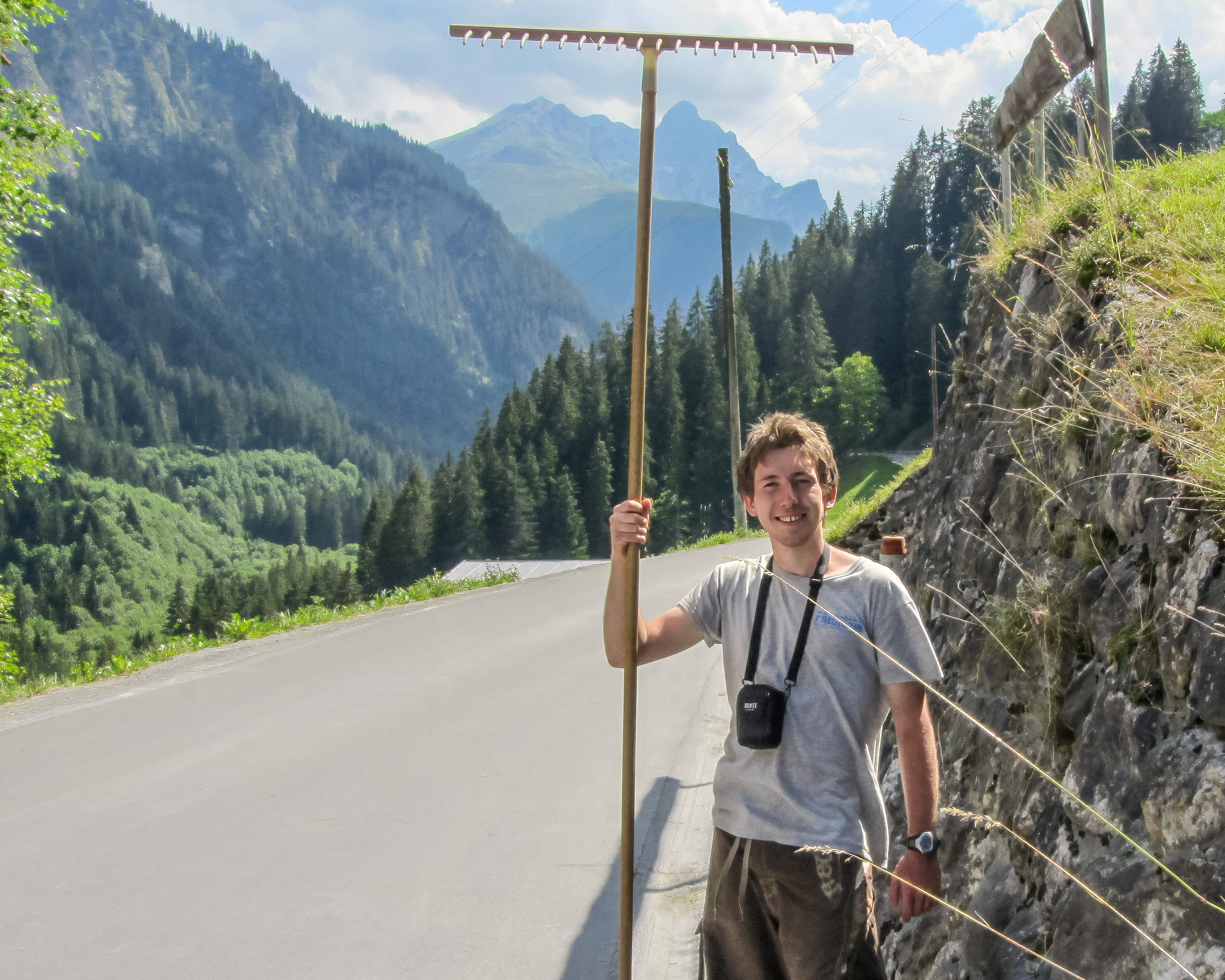
Hay farmer on Safierstrasse

As of 2011, Safien has a population of 294. The historical population is given in the following table:

| year | population |
|---|---|
| 1803 | 770 |
| 1850 | 685 |
| 1900 | 455 |
| 1950 | 453 |
| 2000 | 308 |
| 2010 | 305 |

As of 2008, 0.3% of the population was made up of foreign nationals.

As of 2000:

- most of the population speaks Swiss German (96.1%), with Swiss Italian being second most common ( 1.6%) and Albanian being third ( 1.6%).
- the gender distribution was 49.5% male and 50.5% female.
- the age distribution was as follows:

| Age group | Population | % of total |
|---|---|---|
| Children (0-9yrs) | 49 | 15.9% |
| Teenagers (10-19yrs) | 43 | 14.0% |
| Adults (20-29yrs) | 24 | 7.8% |
| Adults (30-39yrs) | 37 | 12.0% |
| Adults (40-49yrs) | 39 | 12.7% |
| Adults (50-59yrs) | 36 | 11.7% |
| Seniors (60-69yrs) | 30 | 9.7% |
| Seniors (70-79yrs) | 28 | 9.1% |
| Seniors (80-89yrs) | 18 | 5.8% |
| Seniors (90-99yrs) | 4 | 1.3% |
| Total | 308 | 100% |

=== Education ===
Around 61.7% of the population (between age 25-64) have completed either non-mandatory upper secondary education or additional higher education (either university or a Fachhochschule). The nearest fachhochschules to Safien are in Chur, such as the Chur University of Applied Sciences and Fachhochschule Graubünden.

=== Politics ===
In the 2007 federal election the most popular party was the SVP which received 62.4% of the vote. The next three most popular parties were the SP (18.8%), the FDP (7.4%) and the CVP (5.4%).

== Economy ==
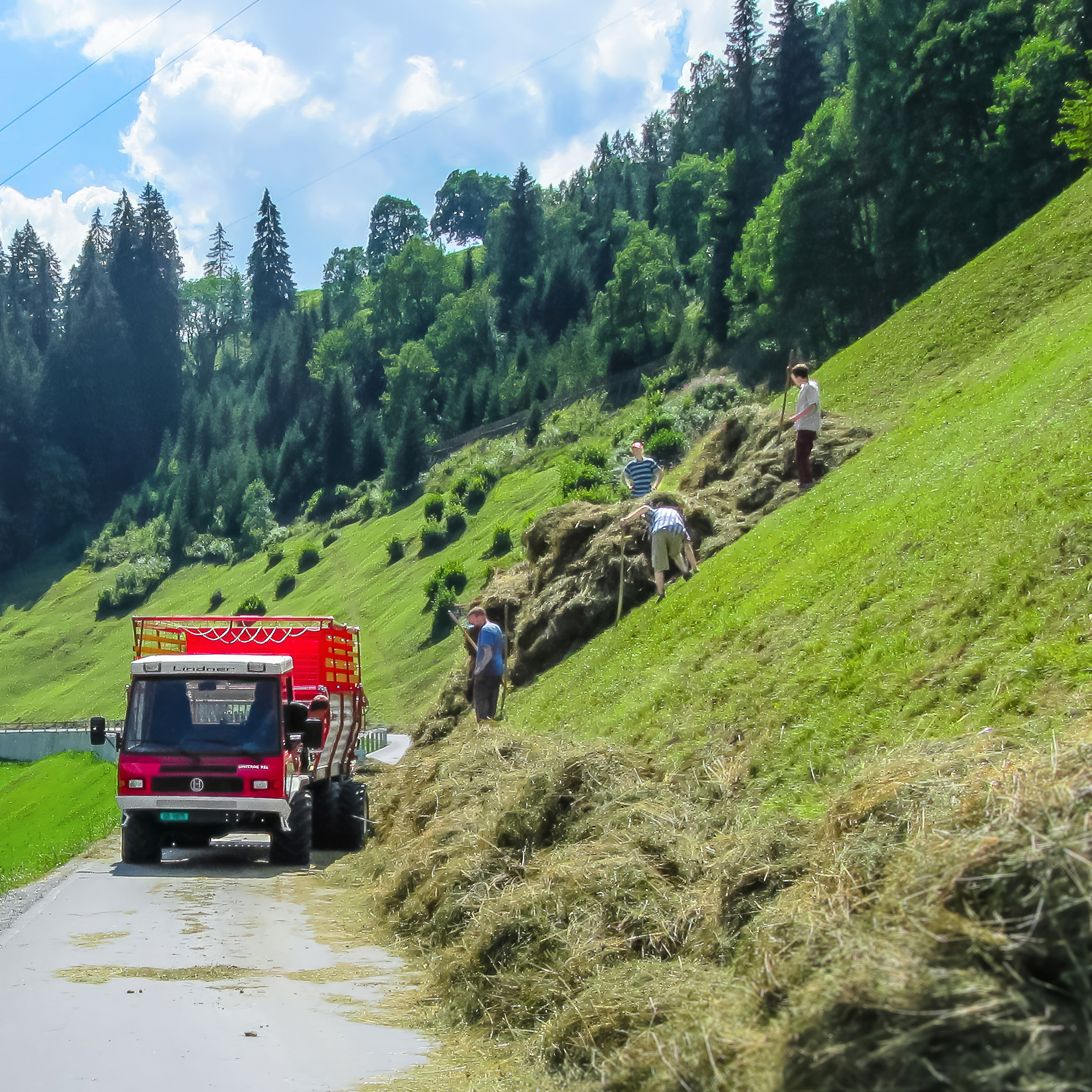
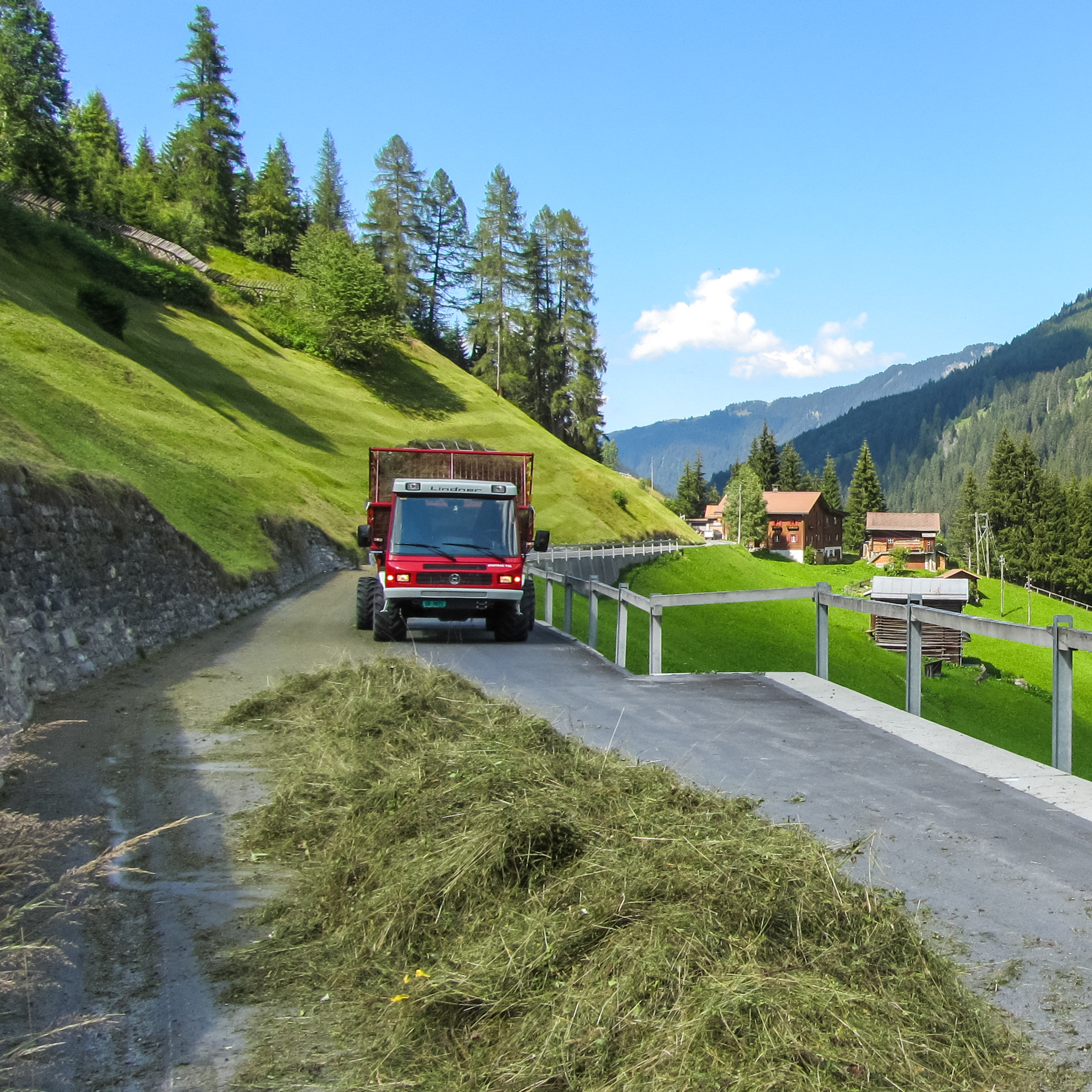
Farmers harvesting hay on Safierstrasse in Safien

As of 2005, Safien has an unemployment rate of 0.46%. Employment and businesses were organized as follows:

| Sector | People Employed | Businesses Involved |
|---|---|---|
| Primary (raw materials) | 89 | 35 |
| Secondary (manufacturing) | 15 | 3 |
| Tertiary (service) | 32 | 12 |
