= Cazis =

- Municipality
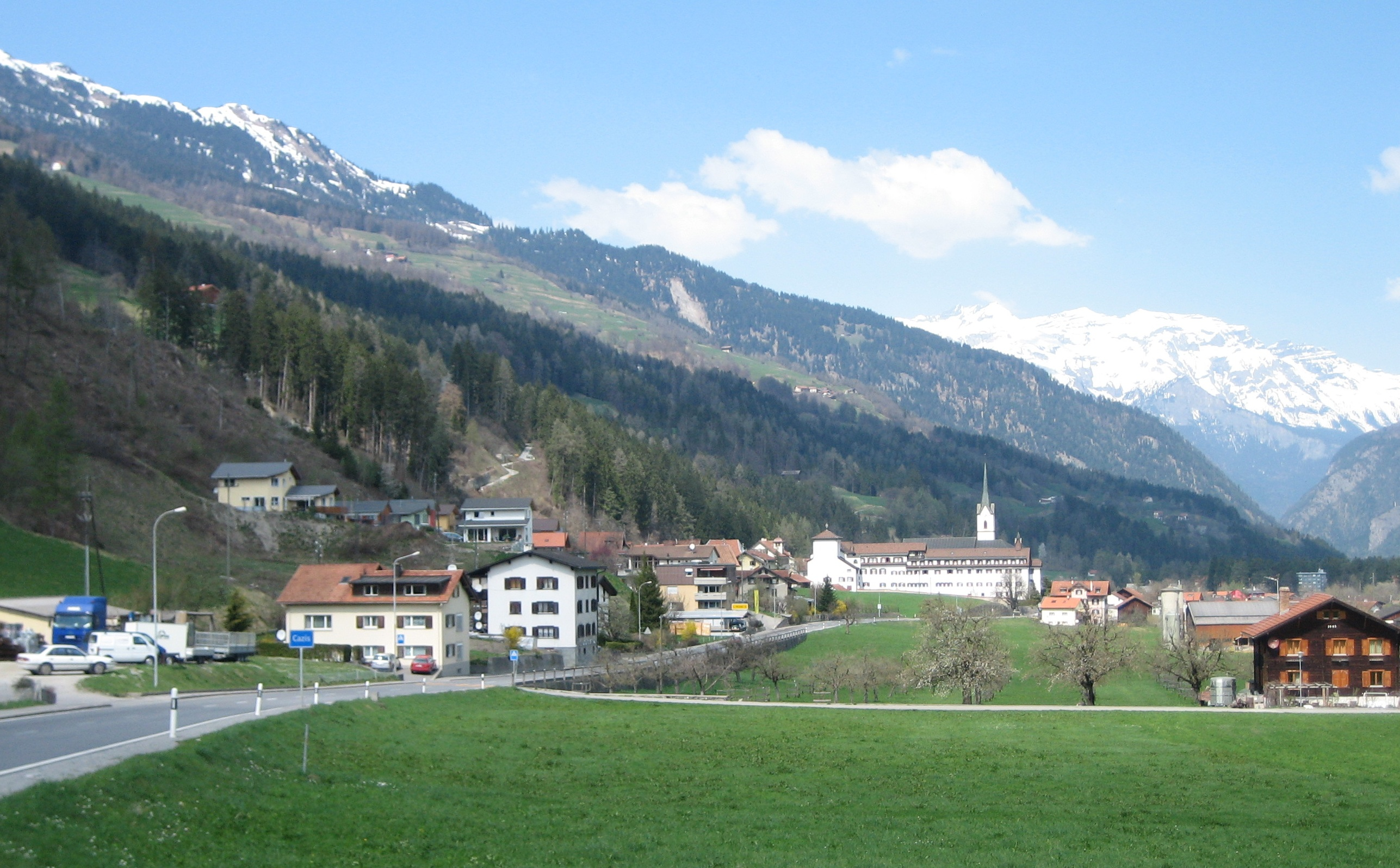

- Flag Coat of arms
- Location of Cazis
- Location within Switzerland Location within Canton of Grisons
- Coordinates: 46°43′N 9°25′E
- Country: Switzerland
- Canton: Grisons
- District: Viamala

Government
  - Mayor: Eduard Decurtins

Area
  - Total: 7.26 km^{2} (2.80 sq mi)
- Elevation: 659 m (2,162 ft)

Population (December 2020)
  - Total: 2,287
  - Density: 315/km^{2} (816/sq mi)
- Time zone: UTC+01:00 (CET)
  - Summer (DST): UTC+02:00 (CEST)
- Postal code: 7408
- SFOS number: 3661
- ISO 3166 code: CH-GR
- Surrounded by: Fürstenau, Masein, Paspels, Pratval, Rhäzüns, Rodels, Rothenbrunnen, Thusis, Tumegl/Tomils
- Website: www.cazis.ch

Cazis (Romansh: Tgazas) is a municipality in the Viamala Region in the Swiss canton of the Grisons. On 1 January 2010 the municipalities of Portein, Präz, Sarn and Tartar merged into the municipality of Cazis.

== History ==
Cazis is first mentioned in 926 as Cacias.

== Geography ==
Aerial view (1970)

Cazis has an area, as of 2006, of 7.3 km^{2} (2.8 sq mi). Of this area, 41% is used for agricultural purposes, while 41.1% is forested. Of the rest of the land, 13.6% is settled (buildings or roads) and the remainder (4.3%) is non-productive (rivers, glaciers or mountains).

Before 2017, the municipality was located in the Thusis sub-district, of the Heinzenberg district, after 2017 it was part of the Viamala Region. It is located on the western side of the Hinterrhein valley. It consists of the linear village of Cazis and the hamlets of Ober- and Unterrealta, Luvreu, Ratitsch, Summaprada, Schauenberg and Valleina. The municipalities of Cazis, Portein, Präz, Sarn, and Tartar merged on 1 January 2010 into a new municipality that will be known as Cazis.

== Demographics ==
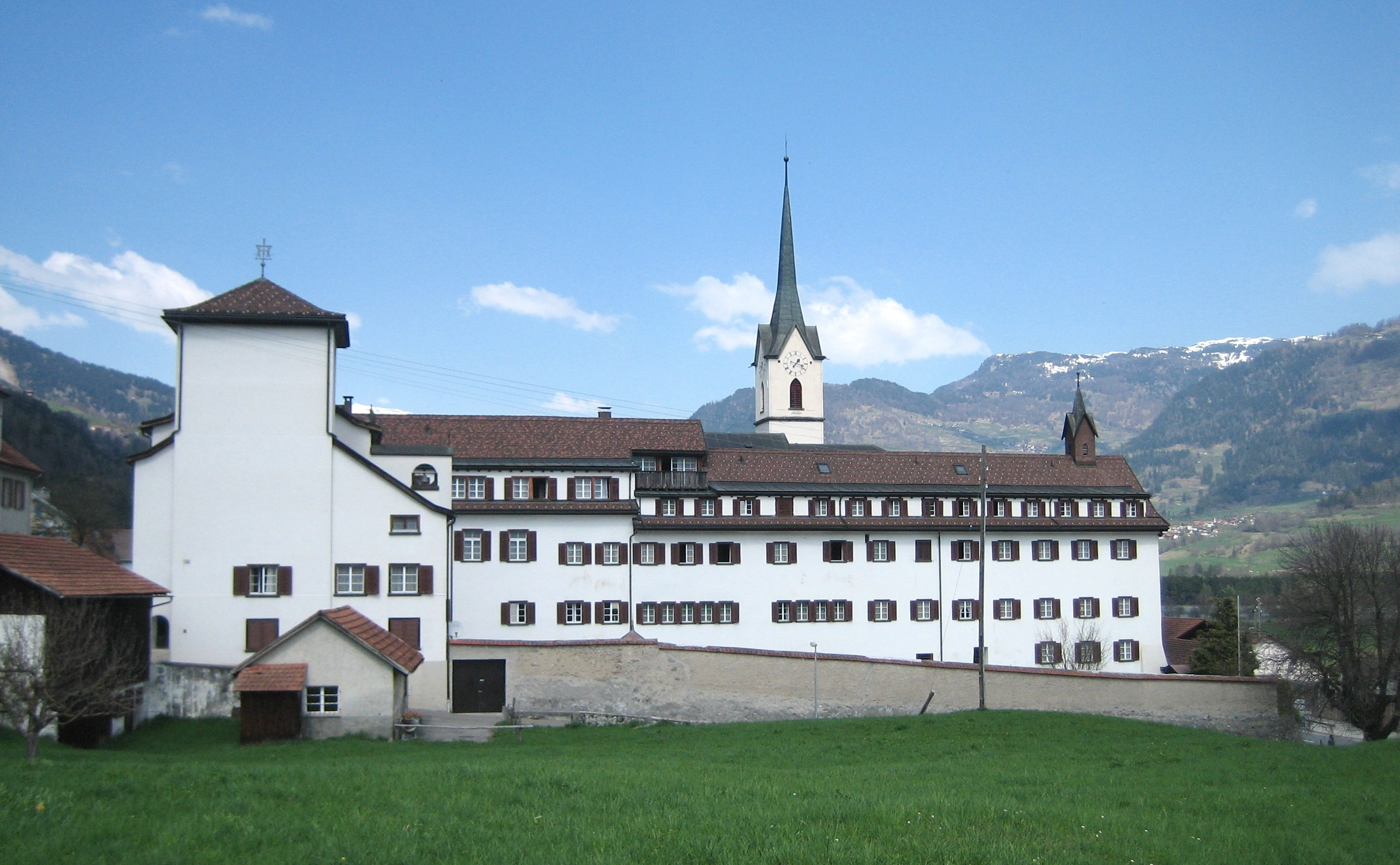
Dominican monastery in Cazis

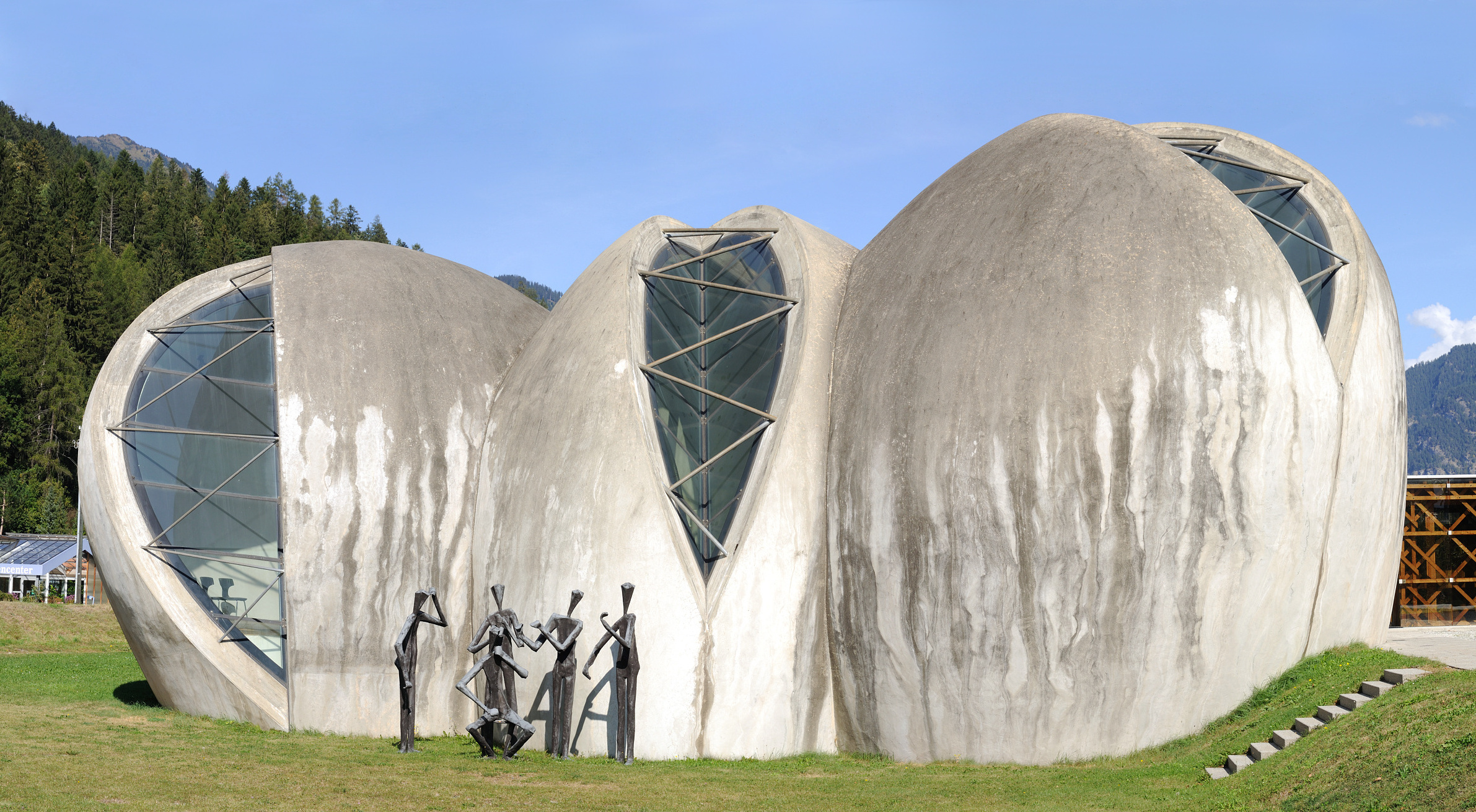
Stone Church in Cazis

Cazis has a population (as of 31 December 2020) of 2,287. As of 2008, 14.8% of the population was made up of foreign nationals. Over the last 10 years the population has grown at a rate of 7.4%.

As of 2000, the gender distribution of the population was 48.2% male and 51.8% female. The age distribution, as of 2000, in Cazis is; 180 people or 11.4% of the population are between 0 and 9 years old. 86 people or 5.5% are 10 to 14, and 126 people or 8.0% are 15 to 19. Of the adult population, 160 people or 10.2% of the population are between 20 and 29 years old. 274 people or 17.4% are 30 to 39, 255 people or 16.2% are 40 to 49, and 199 people or 12.6% are 50 to 59. The senior population distribution is 131 people or 8.3% of the population are between 60 and 69 years old, 87 people or 5.5% are 70 to 79, there are 67 people or 4.3% who are 80 to 89, and there are 10 people or 0.6% who are 90 to 99.

In the 2007 federal election the most popular party was the SVP which received 33.3% of the vote. The next three most popular parties were the CVP (29.6%), the SPS (22.3%) and the FDP (13.4%).

The entire Swiss population is generally well educated. In Cazis about 64.5% of the population (between age 25-64) have completed either non-mandatory upper secondary education or additional higher education (either University or a Fachhochschule).

Cazis has an unemployment rate of 1.09%. As of 2005, there were 69 people employed in the primary economic sector and about 19 businesses involved in this sector. 150 people are employed in the secondary sector and there are 16 businesses in this sector. 564 people are employed in the tertiary sector, with 42 businesses in this sector.

From the 2000 census, 840 or 53.3% are Roman Catholic, while 488 or 31.0% belonged to the Swiss Reformed Church. Of the rest of the population, there are 55 individuals (or about 3.49% of the population) who belong to the Orthodox Church, and there are 12 individuals (or about 0.76% of the population) who belong to another Christian church. There are 25 (or about 1.59% of the population) who are Islamic. There are 53 individuals (or about 3.37% of the population) who belong to another church (not listed on the census), 64 (or about 4.06% of the population) belong to no church, are agnostic or atheist, and 38 individuals (or about 2.41% of the population) did not answer the question.

The historical population is given in the following table:

year	population
1803	420
1850	755
1900	738
1950	1,441
1970	1,687
2000	1,575

== Languages ==
Until 1800, the municipality spoke exclusively Sursilvan, a dialect of Romansh.

Today, the municipality is predominantly German-speaking population, with small Romansh- and Italian-speaking minorities. Most of the population (as of 2000) speaks German (84.2%), with Romansh being second most common ( 4.7%) and Italian being third ( 2.7%).

Languages in Cazis
Language	Census of 1980		Census of 1990		Census of 2000	
Language	Number	Percentage	Number	Percentage	Number	Percentage
German	1166	79.37%	1276	87.52%	1326	91.89%
Romansh	191	13.00%	101	6.93%	74	5.13%
Italian	112	7.62%	81	5.56%	43	2.98%
Population	1469	100%	1458	100%	1443	100%

== Heritage sites of national significance ==
The Cresta (prehistoric settlement), Chapel St. Wendelin and the Catholic Church of St. Martin are listed as Swiss heritage sites of national significance.

== Transportation ==
The municipality has three railway stations: Cazis, Rodels-Realta, and Rothenbrunnen. All three are located on the Landquart–Thusis line with regular service to Chur and St. Moritz.
