= Heinzenberg =

- Municipality
- Coat of arms

- Location of Heinzenberg within Bad Kreuznach district
- Interactive map of Heinzenberg
- Location within Germany Location within Rhineland-Palatinate
- Coordinates: 49°49′27″N 07°29′06″E
- Country: Germany
- State: Rhineland-Palatinate
- District: Bad Kreuznach
- Municipal assoc.: Kirner Land

Government
  - Mayor (2019–24): Stephan Ostgen

Area
  - Total: 1.96 km^{2} (0.76 sq mi)
- Elevation: 198 m (650 ft)

Population (2025-12-31)
  - Total: 28
  - Density: 14/km^{2} (37/sq mi)
- Time zone: UTC+01:00 (CET)
  - Summer (DST): UTC+02:00 (CEST)
- Postal codes: 55606
- Dialling codes: 06754
- Vehicle registration: KH

Heinzenberg is an Ortsgemeinde – a municipality belonging to a Verbandsgemeinde, a kind of collective municipality – in the Bad Kreuznach district in Rhineland-Palatinate, Germany. It belongs to the Verbandsgemeinde Kirner Land, whose seat is in the town of Kirn. With only 28 permanent inhabitants, Heinzenberg is the district's smallest municipality.

== Geography ==
=== Location ===
Heinzenberg lies in the depths of the Kellenbach valley in the southern Hunsrück, roughly 4 km from the place where that brook empties into the Nahe. Bundesstraße 421 runs through the village.

=== Neighbouring municipalities ===
Clockwise from the north, Heinzenberg's neighbours are the municipalities of Hennweiler, Brauweiler, Hochstetten-Dhaun and Oberhausen bei Kirn, all of which likewise lie within the Bad Kreuznach district.

=== Constituent communities ===
Also belonging to Heinzenberg is the outlying homestead of Greberhof. There is also a homestead called the Heinzenberger Gesellschaftsmühle, suggesting a link with Heinzenberg, but this actually lies within neighbouring Hochstetten-Dhaun’s limits.

== History ==
Prehistoric barrows and traces of a Roman presence bear witness to an early settlement history on the small patch of ground on which Heinzenberg now lies. In the Middle Ages a small castle stood not far above the village, and it was mentioned in documents in 1152 as Hemezberg or Henzenberg. Some inhabitants, such as the Lords of Heinzenberg, played quite an important part in the region’s history as vassals of the Counts of Veldenz and the Waldgraves, and also as ministeriales of the Archbishops of Mainz and Trier. Belonging to the Veldenz holding with which the Lords of Heinzenberg had been enfeoffed was, among other things, the Vogtei of Hennweiler. There they were tasked as Vögte by their overlords with the exercise of jurisdiction, the setting and collection of taxes and other levies from the subjects and the military protection of the populace and the church. The area of jurisdiction within which the lords exercised these functions comprised the villages of Hennweiler, Oberhausen, Guntzelberg, Rode, the dale (village) of Heinzenberg and the estate of Eigen. In 1278, the Lords of Heinzenberg sold their castle to the Archbishop of Trier, who then enfeoffed the ministerial family of his time with it. Several times, the Lords of Heinzenberg were Ravengiersburg Abbey’s Schirmvögte (roughly, ecclesiastical protectors). Their coat of arms with the silver buckle hints at a kinship with the Lords of Schmidtburg. Standing out among the Lords of Heinzenberg was Wilhelm III of Heinzenberg, which was underscored even in his own time by the Latin title that he bore: Nobilis vir (“nobleman”). As a Minnesänger whose songwriting even found its way into the Codex Manesse, this member of the lordly house earned his own fame. Shortly before 1400, the lordly House of Heinzenberg died out, and their holdings were then inherited by the Knights of Wartenstein, who lived above the Hahnenbach valley. Wartenstein, the knights’ castle – nowadays a Schloss – became in the early 15th century an administrative hub of the Imperial knightly lordship of Wartenstein, to which also belonged the village of Heinzenberg. The jurisdiction in this zone lay first with the Lords of Schwarzenberg, and then beginning in 1583 with the Lords of Warsberg. After feudalism came to an end once French Revolutionary troops had overrun and occupied the German lands on the Rhine’s left bank, the French imposed a new administrative order on the French Revolutionary model. Beginning in 1798, Heinzenberg belonged to the Mairie (“Mayoralty”) of Kirn. About 1800, the village boasted only six one-floor buildings. After Napoleonic (as it had become in the meantime) French rule ended and the Congress of Vienna imposed yet another new administrative order, the Bürgermeisterei (“Mayoralty”) of Kirn, as it was now called, first belonged to the Simmern district, and then later to the Oberstein district. Only in May 1817 was it grouped into the Prussian Kreuznach district. When Kirn was granted town rights and along with them its own council in 1857, the outlying country villages became the Landbürgermeisterei (“Rural Mayoralty”) of Kirn, which was also headed by the Mayor of Kirn. When this “personal union” was abolished in 1896, the representatives of the rural villages elected their own mayor. The tiny municipality of Heinzenberg remained within this body, now the Amt of Kirn-Land, uninterruptedly through the administrative restructuring in 1969/1970, when the Amt became the Verbandsgemeinde of Kirn-Land. In 1980, the village had 50 inhabitants living in 13 dwellings in 11 buildings.

=== Population development ===
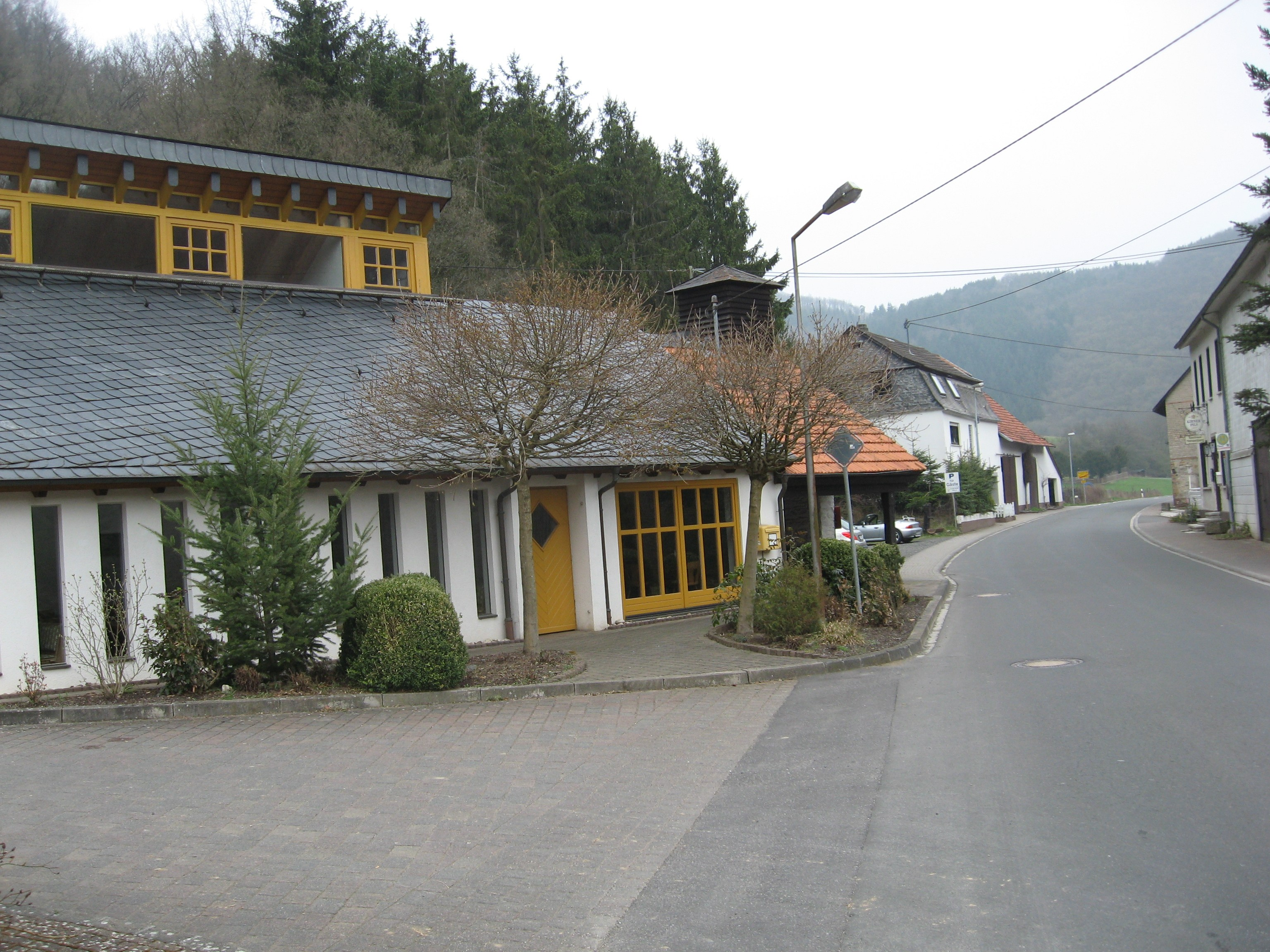
Heinzenberg – a very small village

Heinzenberg's population development since Napoleonic times is shown in the table below. The figures for the years from 1871 to 1987 are drawn from census data:

Year	Inhabitants
1815	66
1835	66
1871	49
1905	48
1939	60

Year	Inhabitants
1950	58
1961	53
1970	52
1987	30
2005	27

== Religion ==
As at 30 September 2013, there are 28 full-time residents in Heinzenberg, and of those, 2 are Evangelical (7.143%), 20 are Catholic (71.429%), 1 (3.571%) belongs to another religious group and 5 (17.857%) either have no religion or will not reveal their religious affiliation.

== Politics ==
=== Municipal council ===
The council is made up of 6 council members, who were elected by majority vote at the municipal election held on 7 June 2009, and the honorary mayor as chairman.

=== Mayor ===
Heinzenberg's mayor is Stephan Ostgen.

=== Coat of arms ===
The German blazon reads: Schild gespalten, vorne in Schwarz ein silberner goldgekrönter, -bewehrter und -gezungter Löwe, hinten in Rot eine silberne mit 4 roten und 4 blauen Steinen belegte Gewandschließe.

The municipality's arms might in English heraldic language be described thus: Per pale sable a lion rampant sinister argent armed, langued and crowned Or, and gules an arming buckle of the second garnished with eight stones, four of the fourth and four azure.

The charge on the dexter (armsbearer's right, viewer's left) side refers to the Lordship of Wartenstein, an Electoral-Trier fief to the House of Warsberg. The other charge, on the sinister (armsbearer's left, viewer's right) side, is the heraldic device once borne by the Lords of Heinzenberg, a buckle. Municipal council, on 28 January 1966, gave the architect Palm from Bad Kreuznach the task of designing a municipal coat of arms. At a council meeting on 16 May 1966, council adopted the design that had been put forth. After consent by the state archive, the Ministry of the Interior in Mainz granted approval for Heinzenberg to bear its own arms on 29 June 1966. The German blazon does not mention that the lion faces sinister (heraldic left). The municipal banner also bears this coat of arms in the centre.

== Culture and sightseeing ==
=== Buildings ===
The following are listed buildings or sites in Rhineland-Palatinate’s Directory of Cultural Monuments:

- At Dorfstraße 3 – house with single roof ridge, timber-frame, partly solid, earlier half of the 19th century
- Castle Heinzenberg ruin – location of Castle Heinzenberg, mentioned in 1159, in ruins since the 1452 fire

=== Clubs ===
Since it is a very small place, Heinzenberg does not have much of a club life, but it does have its Kultur- und Heimatverein Heinzenberg e.V., the culture and local history club.

== Economy and infrastructure ==
=== Transport ===
Running through Heinzenberg is Bundesstraße 421, which leads to Bundesstraße 41 at Simmertal, where a turn to the left takes one to Bad Sobernheim and Bad Kreuznach to the east, and a turn to the right takes one to Kirn and Idar-Oberstein to the west. North of Heinzenberg, Bundesstraße 421 leads to Kirchberg. Serving nearby Kirn is a railway station on the Nahe Valley Railway (Bingen–Saarbrücken).
