= Domleschg (valley) =

Valley in Graubünden, Switzerland

Coordinates: 46.7507°N 9.4331°E

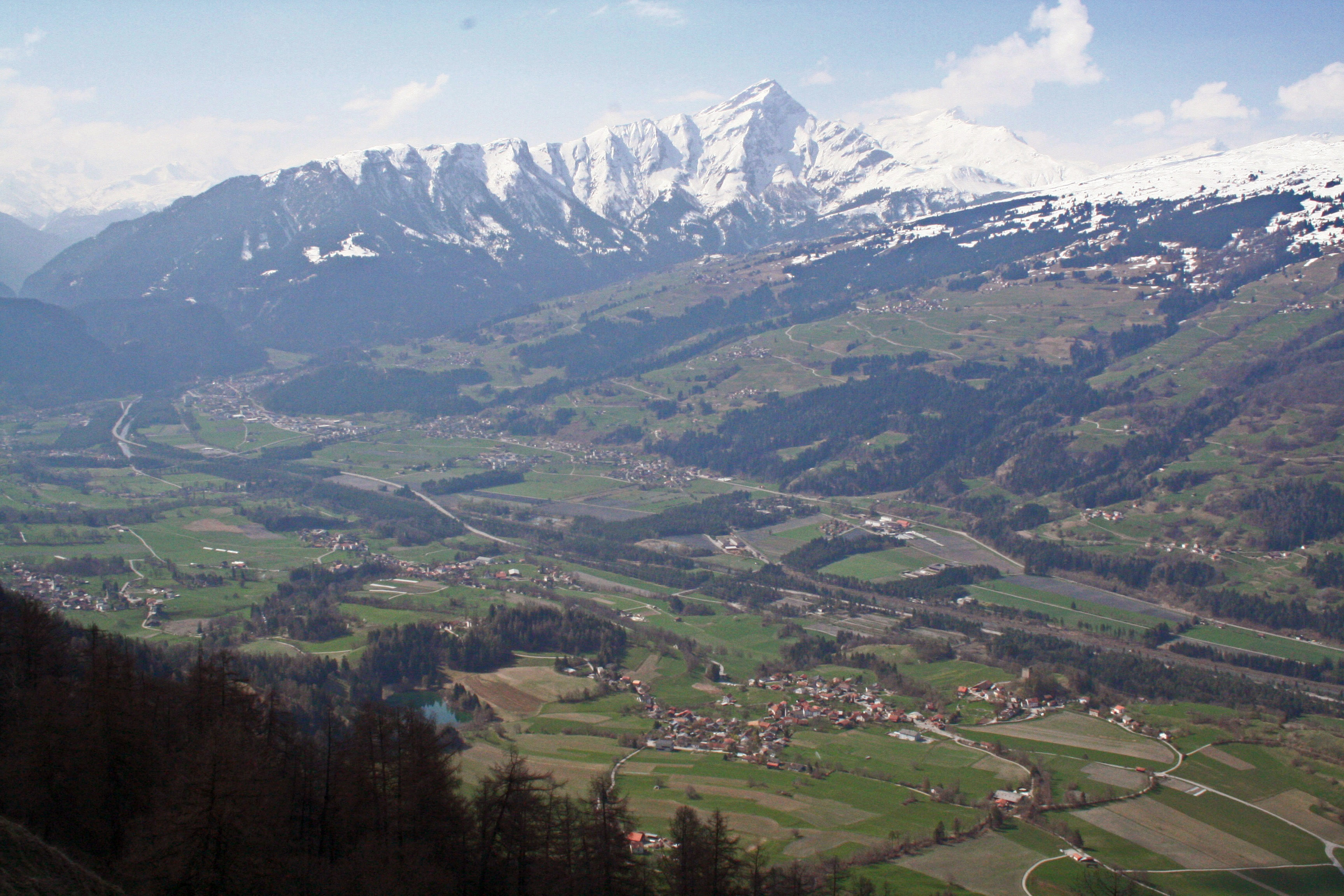
Views over Domleschg looking south towards Piz Beverin

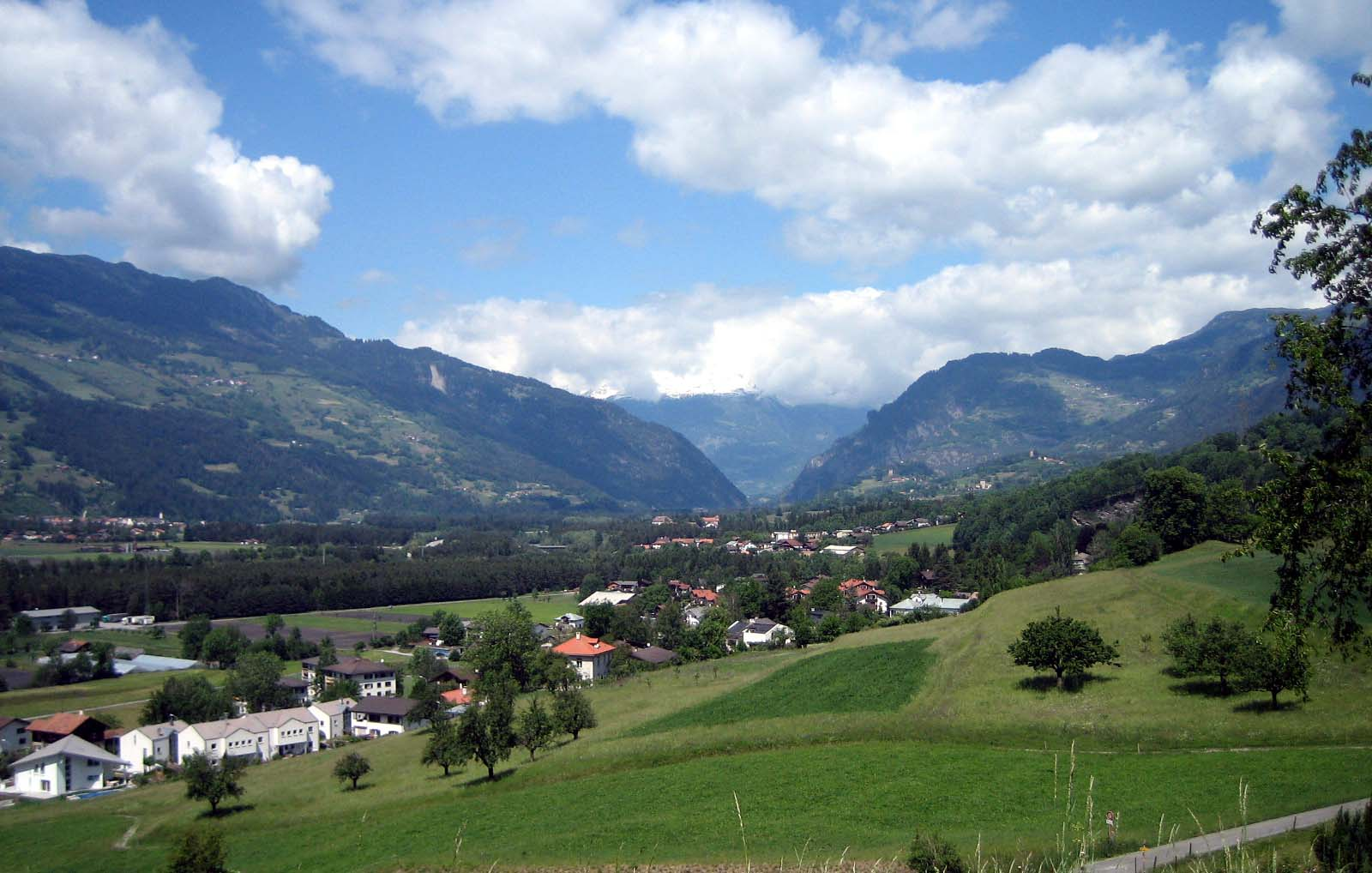
Views over Domleschg looking north

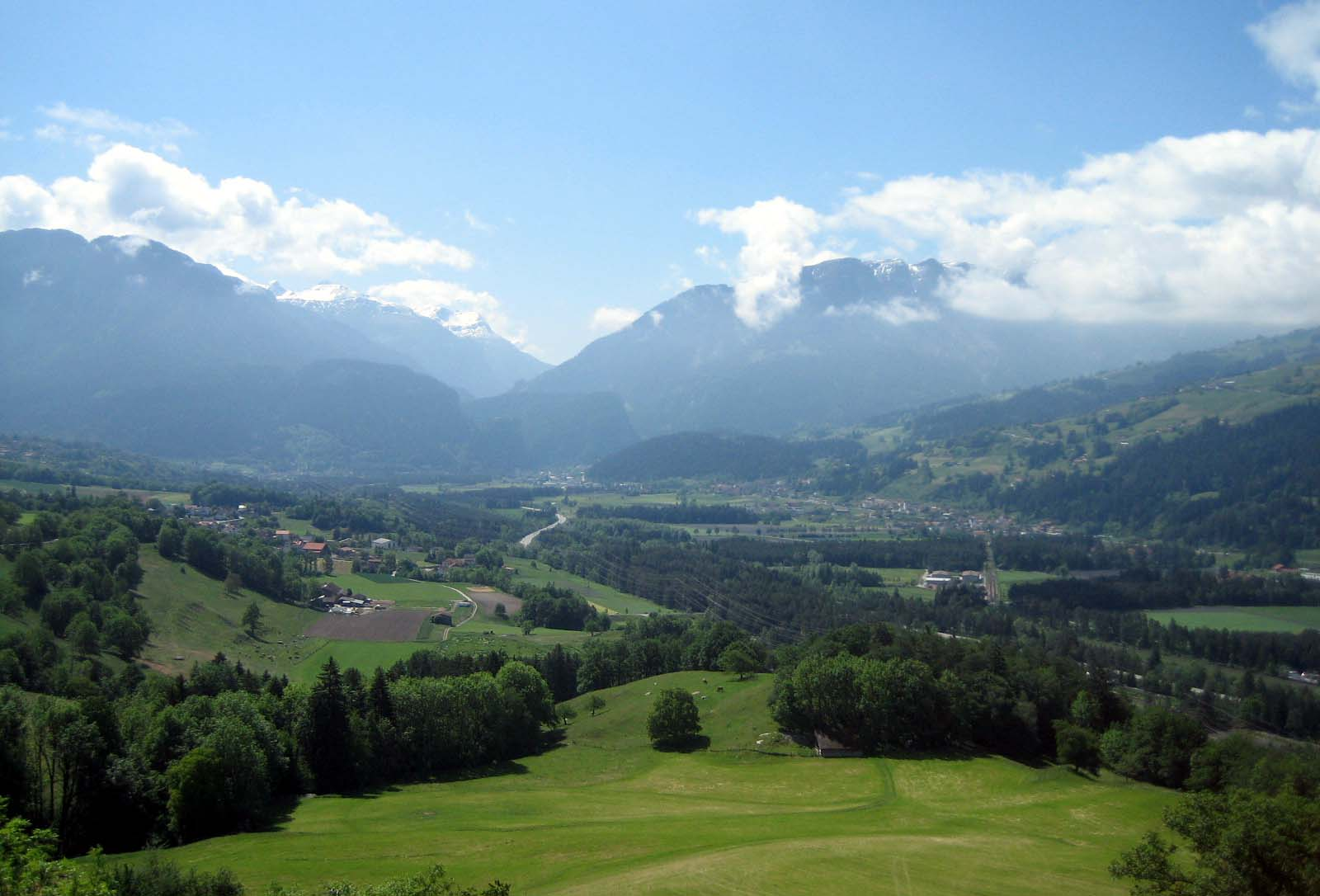
Views over Domleschg looking south

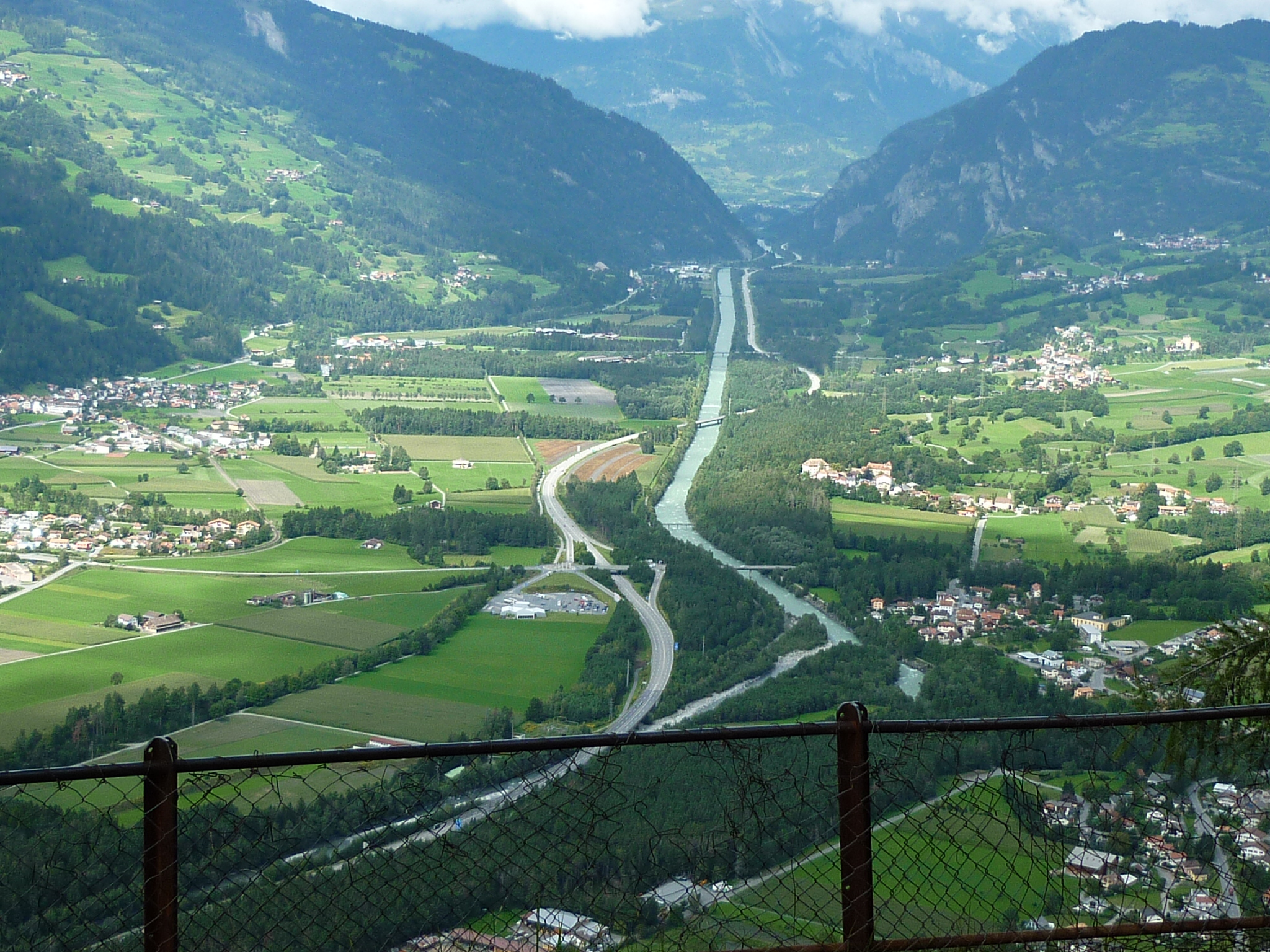
Domleschg, View from the Carschenna above Sils im Domleschg

The Domleschg (Romansh: Tumleastga) is a valley in Graubünden in Switzerland. Geographically, the name "Domleschg" covers both sides of the valley. Politically, the villages on the left bank of the Posterior Rhine form the Kreis (sub-district) of Thusis and those on the right bank form the Kreis of Domleschg. Thusis is the main village in the valley. The northernmost locality is Rothenbrunnen, the southernmost is Sils.

== Political municipalities ==
The following municipalities lie in the Domleschg valley (the first name is the German name, the second is Romansh):

- Almens/Almen
- Cazis/Caza
- Feldis/Veulden
- Fürstenau/Farschno
- Paspels/Pasqual
- Pratval/Pratval
- Rodels/Roten
- Rothenbrunnen/Giuvaulta
- Scharans/Sharons
- Scheid/Sched
- Sils im Domleschg/Seglias
- Thusis/Tusaun
- Tomils/Tumegl
- Trans/Traun

== Rivers ==
The Posterior Rhine emerges from the Schams (Romansh: Schons) valley. The Albula joins from the right. The section of the Posterior Rhine from the Albula confluence to Reichenau is mostly canalized. At Reichenau, the Posterior Rhine merges with the Anterior Rhine, forming the Rhine.

The Domleschg valley is a broad valley, surrounded by high mountains. Before the Posterior Rhine was canalized in the 19th century, it would meander all over the valley. Its natural appearance is now only visible on the last kilometers before the confluence at Reichenau.

== Language ==
As can be inferred from the place names, people in the valley was originally spoke the Sutsilvan dialect of the Romansh language. In the 19th century, the German language started spreading from Fürstenau and Sils. For the last twenty years, all municipalities in the valley have had a German-speaking majority. The Romansh speaking minority is concentrated in the mountain villages Scheid and Feldis.

== Transport ==
The highway A13 runs through the valley, as does a line of the Rhaetian Railway. The Postauto provides more fine-grained public transport.

== Castles ==
The Domleschg is strategically positioned on the route to three main Alpine passes: the Splügen Pass, the San Bernardino Pass and the Julier Pass. To control this route, castles were built, making the Domleschg one of the Swiss regions richest in castles. From north to south, they are Hochjuvalt and Innerjuvalt in Rothenbrunnen, Ortenstein in Tomils, Hasensprung in Pratval, Old Süns and New-Süns in Paspels, Rietberg in Pratval again, Heinzenberg Castle in Präz on the left bank, Baldenstein in Sils and Campbell, Ehrenfels Hohenrätien and Obertagstein above Thusis.

A hiking trail named Burgenpfad Domleschg provides easy access to all these castles.

== References and sources ==
- Plasch Barandun: Das Domleschg - La Tumgleastga, Chur, 2005, ISBN 3-905342-26-X.
- Mathias Kundert: Der Sprachwechsel im Domleschg und am Heinzenberg, Chur, 2007, ISBN 978-3-85637-340-5.
