= Alt-Süns Castle =

Ruined castle in Switzerland

- Ruine Alt-Süns
- Paspels village, Domleschg
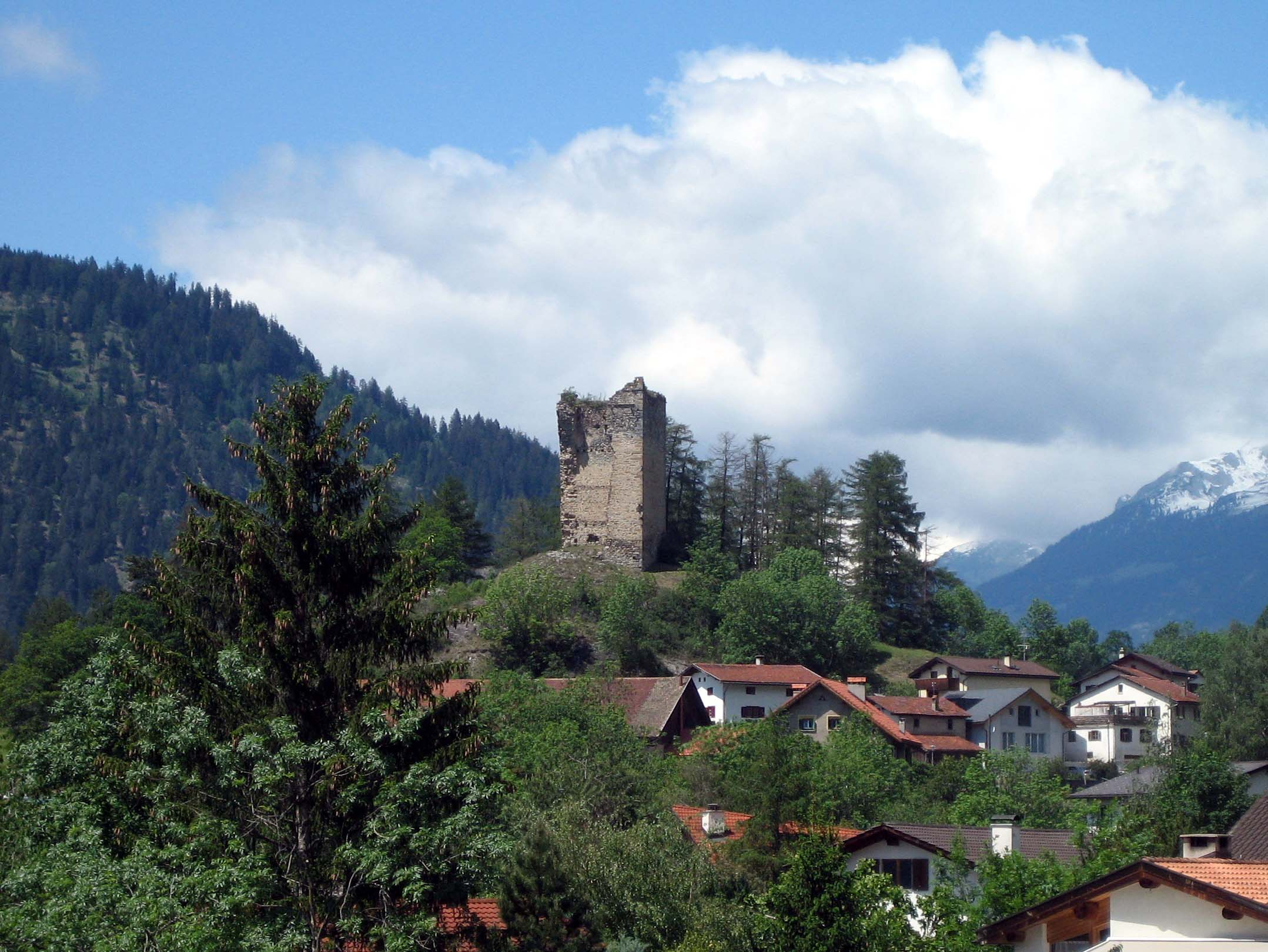

Site information
- Type: hill castle
- Code: CH-GR
- Condition: ruin

Location
- Coordinates: 46°44′58″N 9°26′21″E
- Height: 784 m above the sea

Site history
- Built: about 1200

Alt-Süns Castle or Alt-Sins Castle German: Ruine Alt-Süns is a ruined castle in the municipality of Domleschg in the Viamala Region of the canton of Graubünden in Switzerland.

== History ==
Alt-Süns Castle was built around 1200 by the Freiherr von Vaz as the center of their estates in the Domleschg valley. Their Herrschaft of Paspels/Süns was first mentioned in a record in 1237, but the castle wasn't mentioned until 1285. When the last male heir of the Vaz line, Donat von Vaz, died in 1338, the castle and lands were inherited by the Counts of Werdenberg-Sargans. They sold it to the von Matsch family in 1365, but retained the right to buy it back, which they did toward the end of the 14th century. The castle was specifically mentioned in a treaty between Schwyz, Glarus and Werdenberg-Sargans in 1437. The castle was destroyed in 1451 during a war between the residents of the Schams valley against Werdenberg-Sargans. The attackers demolished the south-west corner of the castle, rendering it useless. After a peace treaty was signed in 1452, the Counts abandoned the castle.

== Castle site ==
The castle was built on a hill top near the village of Paspels and not far from Neu-Süns Castle. The main tower is located on the eastern side of the hill. It is 12 m × 12 m (39 ft × 39 ft) and has 2 m (6.6 ft) thick walls. Except where the south-west corner was pulled down, the tower is four stories tall. The original tower was only three stories tall, but in a second construction phase, the fourth story was added as well as a ring wall. The ring wall was built with decorative opus spicatum patterns in the stonework. Today only a portion of the eastern wall remains.

On the western side of the hill there are a few traces of an outer bailey. It probably contained storage or production buildings, though nothing is visible today. A ditch separated the two parts of the castle.

== Gallery ==
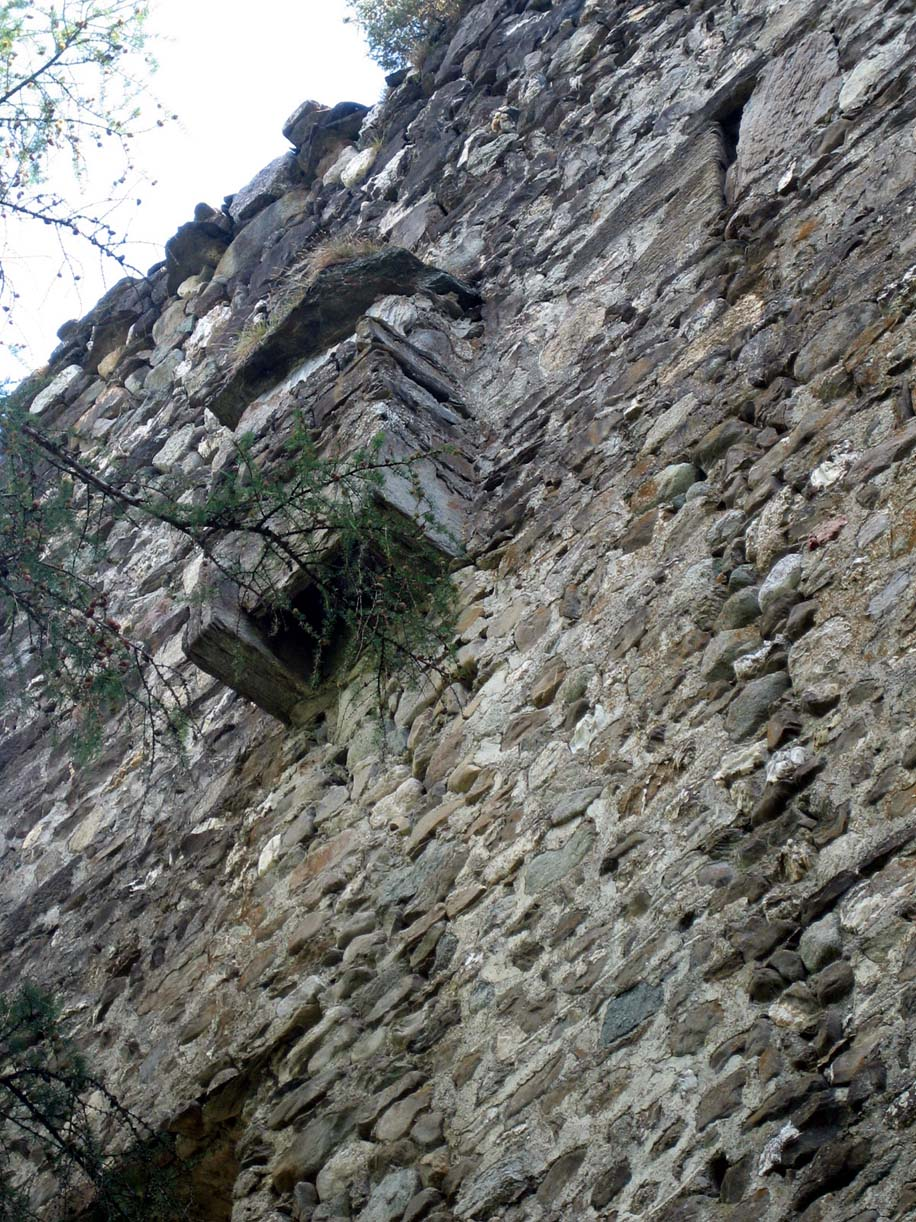
Garderobe or privy projecting out of the castle

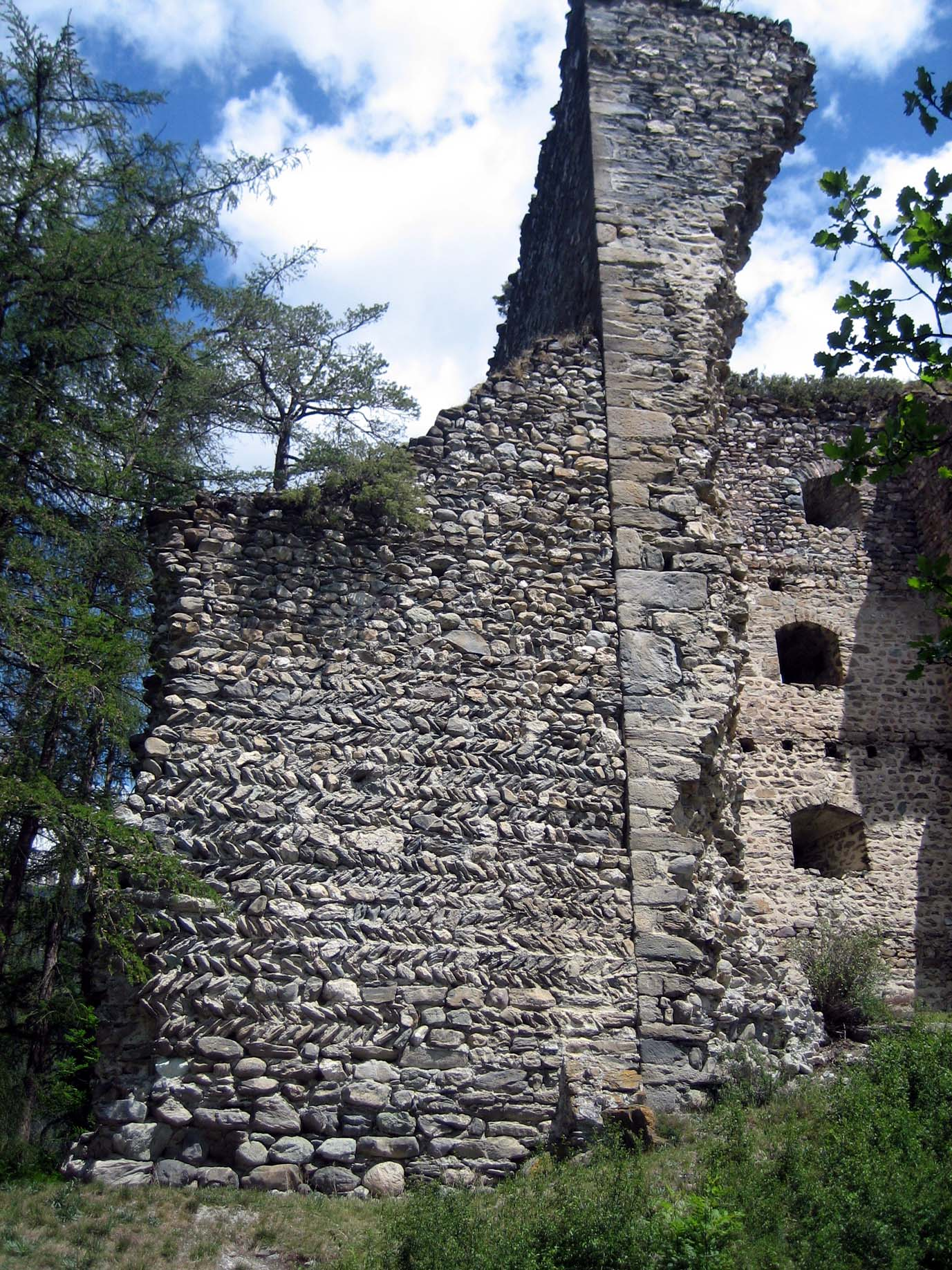
Castle wall with the opus spicatum or herringbone pattern visible

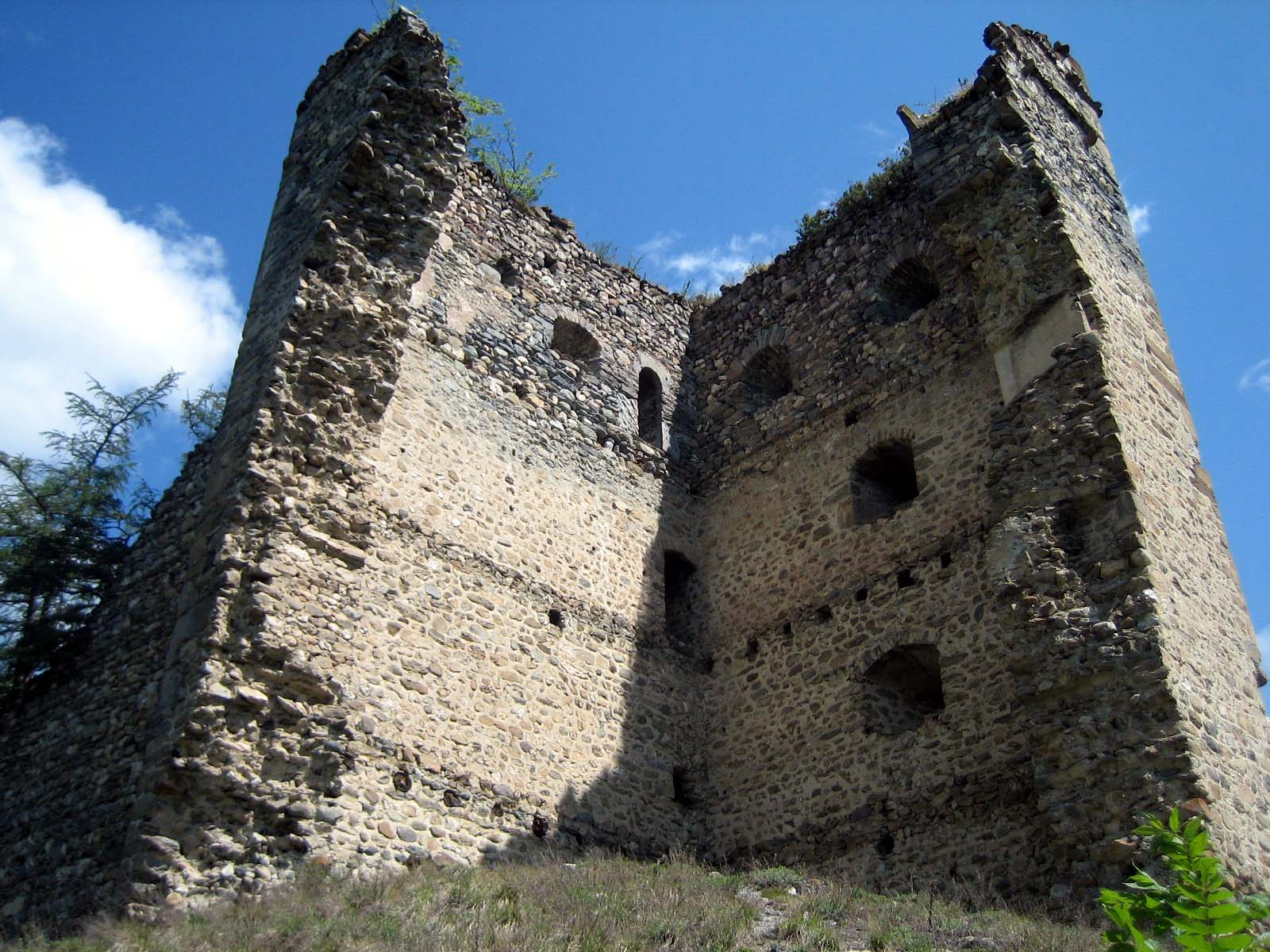
Interior of the castle

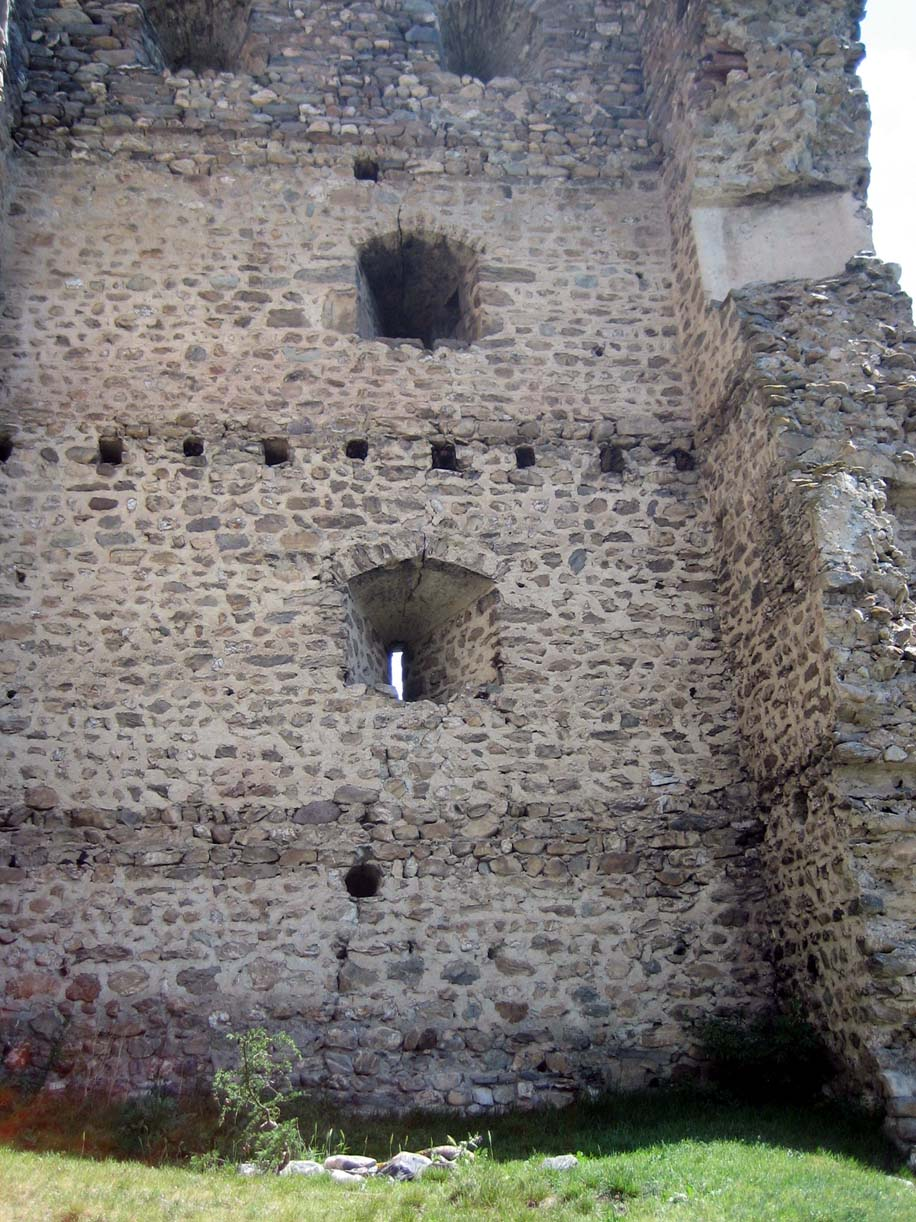
Interior of the castle

== See also ==
- List of castles in Switzerland
