= Tguma =

Mountain in Switzerland

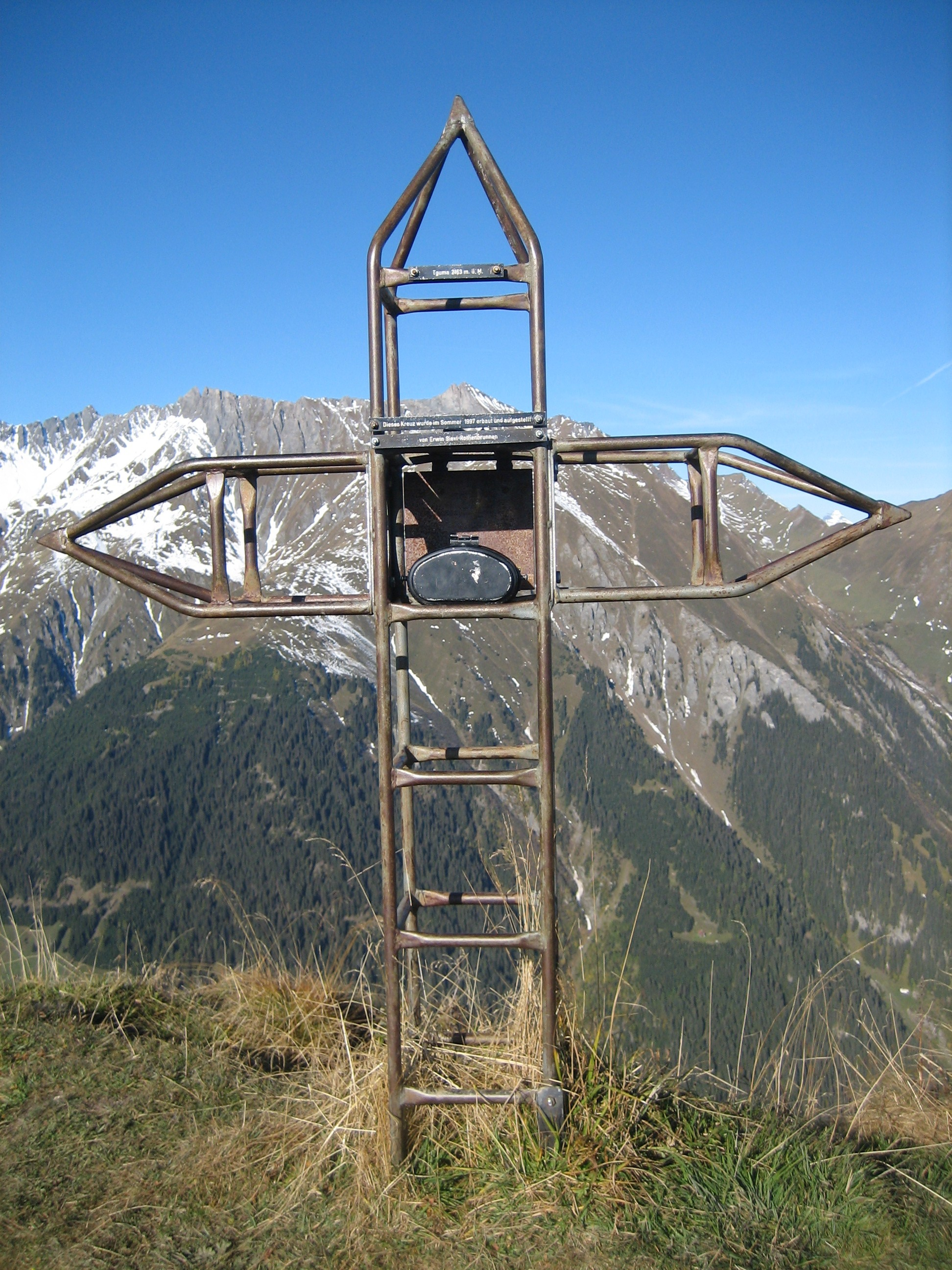
- Summit

Highest point
- Elevation: 2,163 m (7,096 ft)
- Prominence: 164 m (538 ft)
- Parent peak: Lüschgrat
- Coordinates: 46°43′07.6″N 9°21′21.6″E

Geography
- Location within Switzerland
- Location: Graubünden, Switzerland
- Parent range: Lepontine Alps

The Tguma is a mountain of the Swiss Lepontine Alps, situated west of Thusis in the canton of Graubünden. It lies on the range between the Safiental and the Domleschg.
