= Glaser Grat =

Mountain in Switzerland

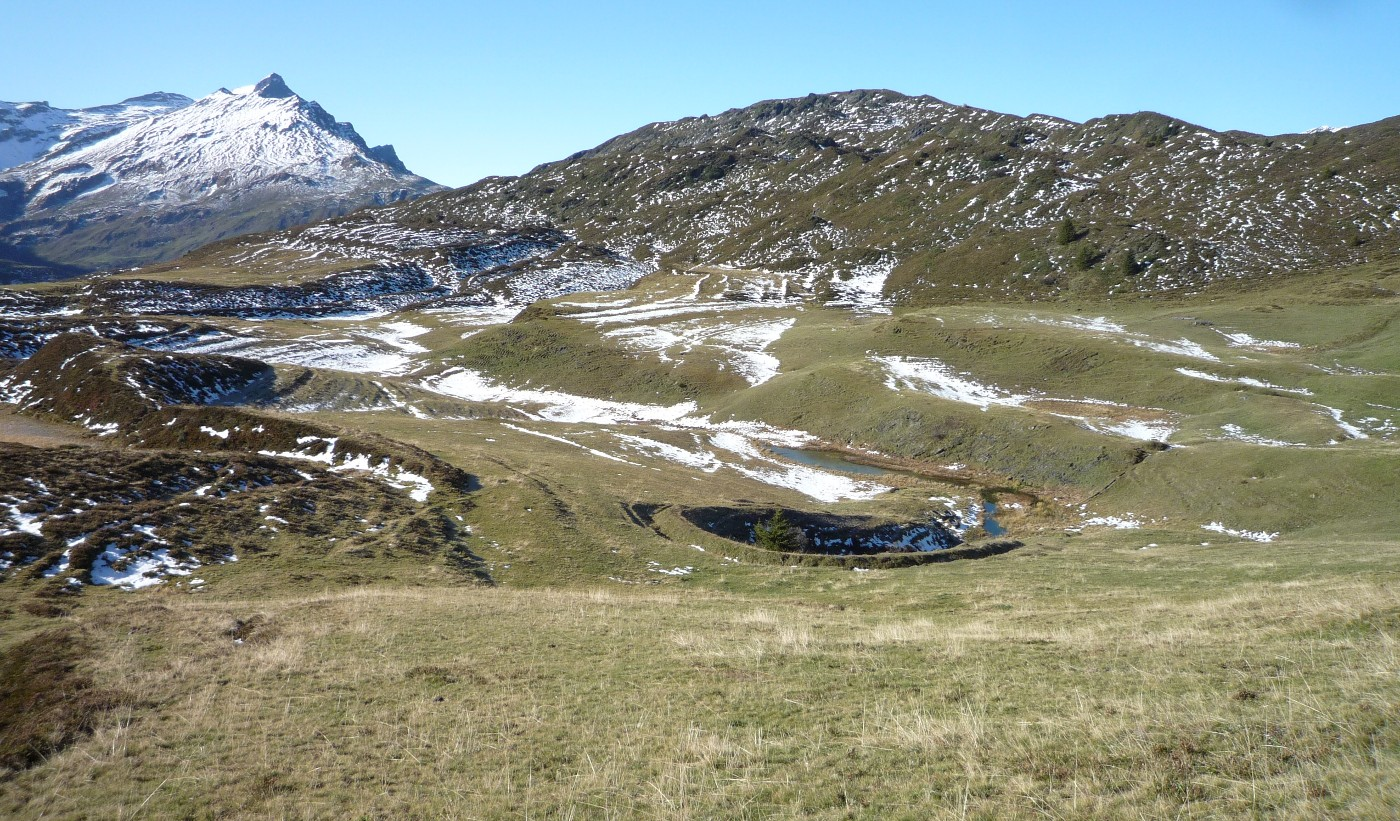
- The Glaser Grat from the east side

Highest point
- Elevation: 2,124 m (6,969 ft)
- Prominence: 135 m (443 ft)
- Parent peak: Lüschgrat
- Coordinates: 46°41′9.96″N 9°20′17.16″E

Geography
- Location within Switzerland
- Location: Graubünden, Switzerland
- Parent range: Lepontine Alps

The Glaser Grat is a mountain of the Lepontine Alps, located between Safien and Tschappina in the canton of Graubünden. It lies just north of the Glas Pass, from where a trail leads to the summit.
