= Glas Pass =

Mountain pass in Switzerland

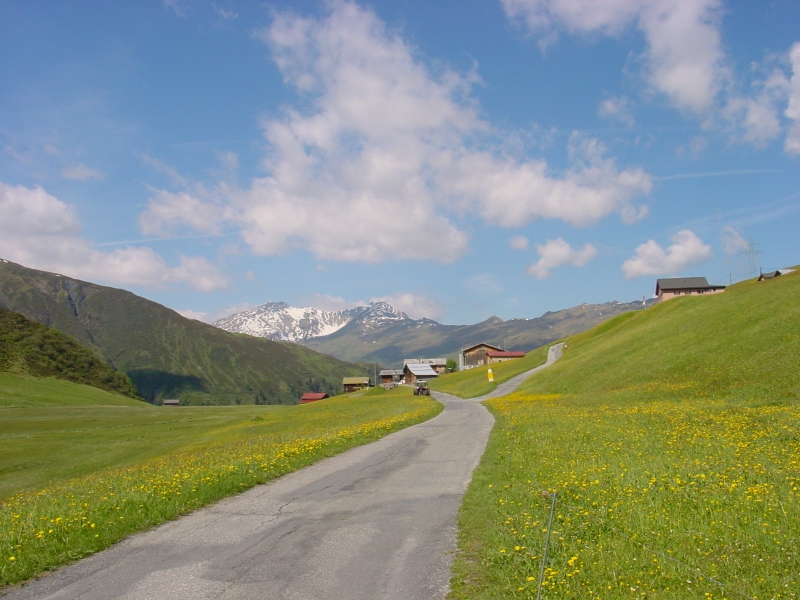
- The summit, view towards the west

- Location within Switzerland
- Elevation: 1,846 metres (6,056 ft)
- Traversed by: Trail (dead-end road)

Third Approach
- Location: Graubünden, Switzerland
- Range: Lepontine Alps
- Coordinates: 46°40′39″N 09°20′53″E

The Glas Pass (German: Glaspass; el. 1846 m) is a high mountain pass in the Lepontine Alps, located between the valleys of Safiental and Domleschg in central Graubünden. It is the deepest point on the ridge between the Lüschgrat (key col: 332 m) and Piz Beverin. The pass is overlooked by the Glaser Grat (north) and the Hoch Büel (south).

The Glas Pass is crossed by a small paved road, although it goes no further than Inner Glas (1,819 m), less than two kilometres west of the pass. The Glas Pass is connected from Thusis on the east side, via Tschappina. On the west side, a trail connects Inner Glas with Safien-Platz (1,315 m). The area is served by PostBus Switzerland during the summer season.

== See also ==
- List of mountain passes in Switzerland
