= Innerjuvalt Castle =

Castle in Switzerland

- Burg Innerjuvalt
- Rothenbrunnen
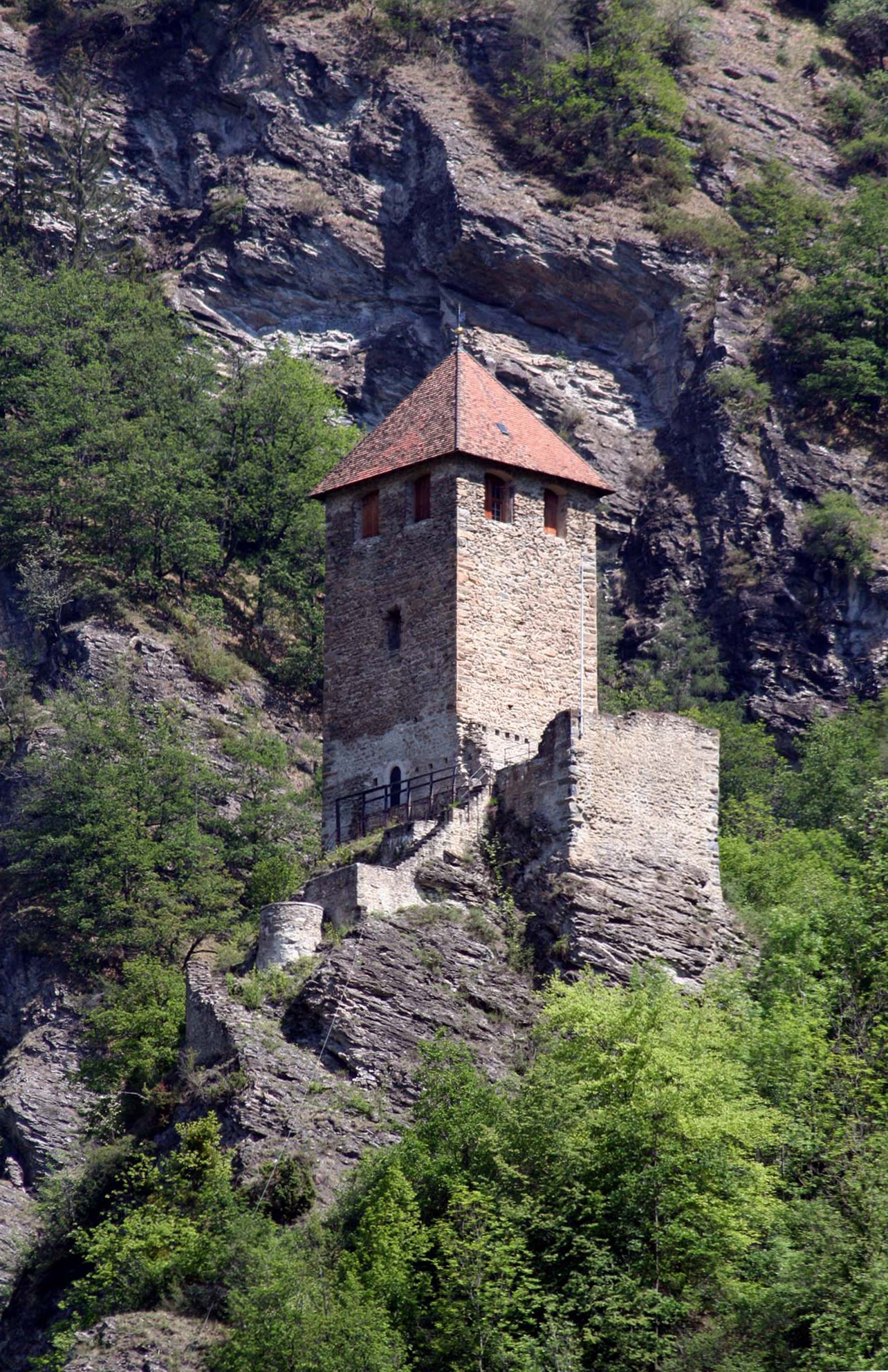
- Innerjuvalt Castle

Site information
- Type: hill castle
- Code: CH-GR
- Condition: ruin

Location
- Coordinates: 46°46′6″N 9°25′54″E
- Height: 780 m above the sea

Site history
- Built: around 1250

Innerjuvalt Castle (also called Oberjuvalt or Hochjuvalt) is a castle in the municipality of Rothenbrunnen of the Canton of Graubünden in Switzerland.

== History ==
Innerjuvalt was built about 2 km (1.2 mi) south-east of the older Hochjuvalt Castle by the Freiherr von Juvalt(a). It was built in two parts on a narrow rocky outcropping above the entrance to the Domleschg Valley. The upper castle was first built around 1250 and was expanded around 1273. In 1342 two of the von Juvalt family, Albrecht and Bertram, appeared in a probate court to settle their inheritance, with Bertram giving up his rights to Innerjuvalt. In 1372 Elgof and Friedrich von Juvalt divided the inheritance again, with Eglof receiving the castle, its meadows, a mill and vineyards. In 1382 Egolf's wife Ursula was living in the castle. In 1423 Rudolf von Juvalt was ordered to continually live in the castle, but by 1440 they had moved to the more accessible lower castle. However, they added a third story to the tower in the late 15th century.

In 1462 Barbara von Juvalt sold the castle to her brother in law Pedrutt von Wannis. A few decades later it was abandoned and by 1570 was described as a ruin.

== Castle site ==
The upper castle was built around 1250 as a two-story palas, probably to house workers as they completed the castle. A two-story main tower and an attached residential wing were added to the north-east of the palas. A third story was added to the tower in the late 15th century. A wall was built on lower western side of the outcropping, with the remainder protected by steep cliffs. A bakery and a cistern were built along this wall. Beginning in 1979 the communities of Domleschg and the Burgenvereine Graubünden added a new roof and repaired and rebuilt the castle. The ruins were excavated in 1980, 1982 and 1990. Today the castle grounds are open for visitors and the tower can be rented by small groups.

The lower castle was built at the foot of the cliff. It consisted of a ring wall with a gatehouse on the southern side. A large palas or residential building was built along the wall. The northern side of the courtyard was terraced for farming. Today very little of the lower castle remains.

== Gallery ==
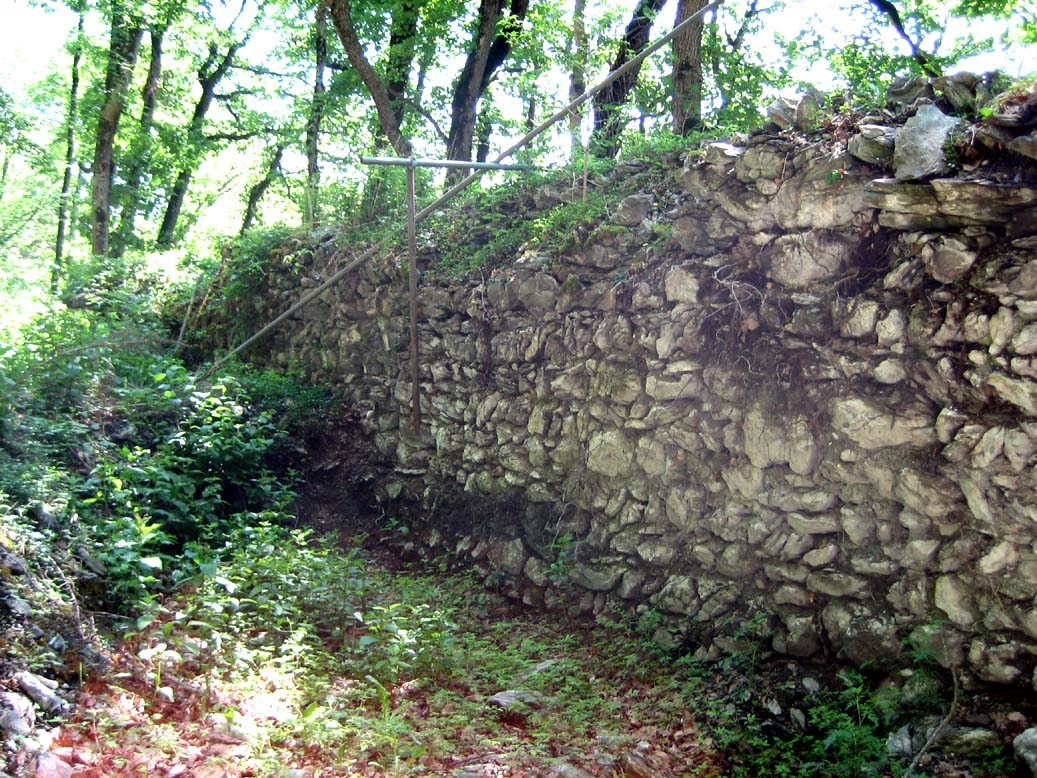
Walls of the lower castle

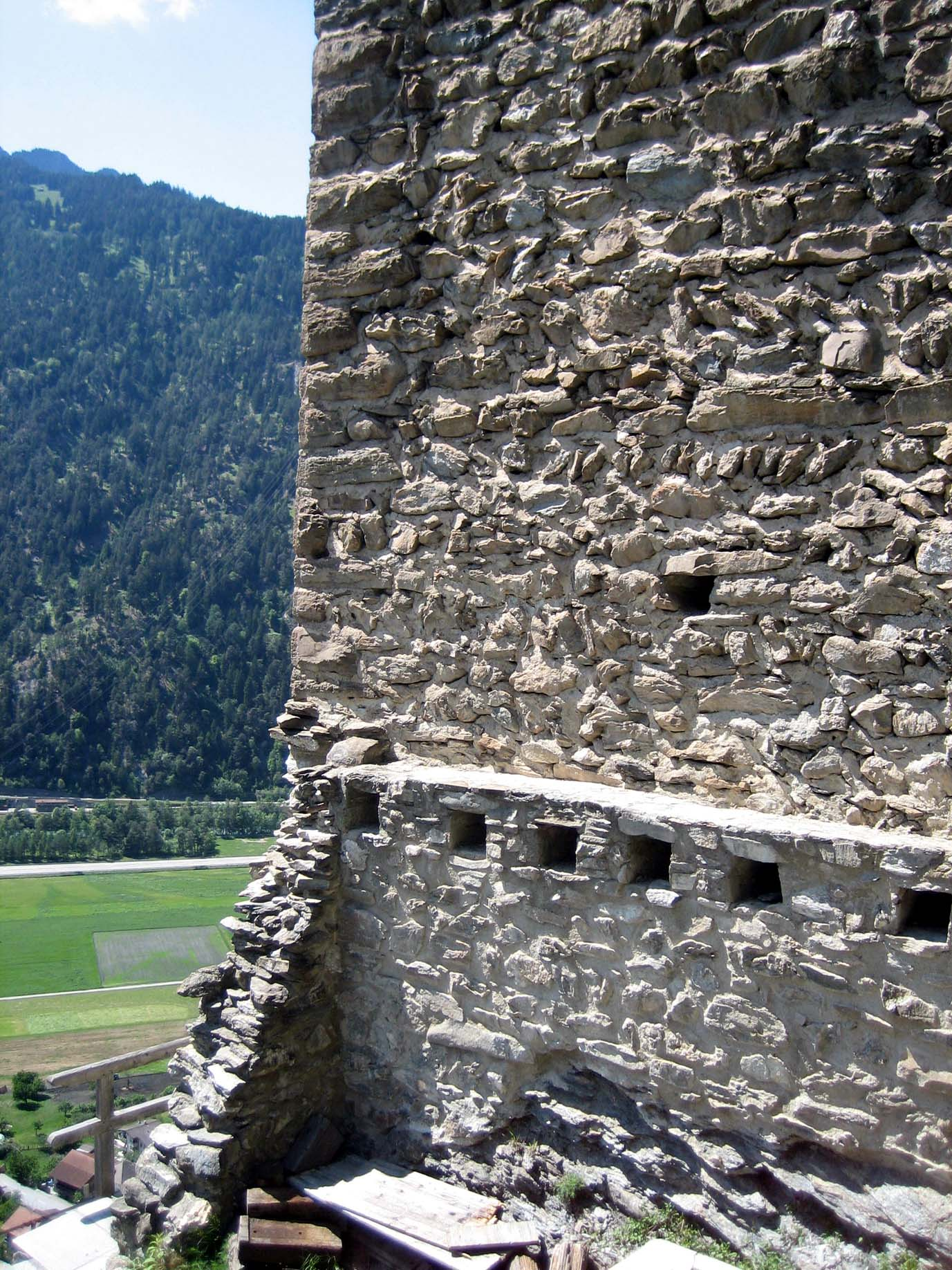
Base of the tower

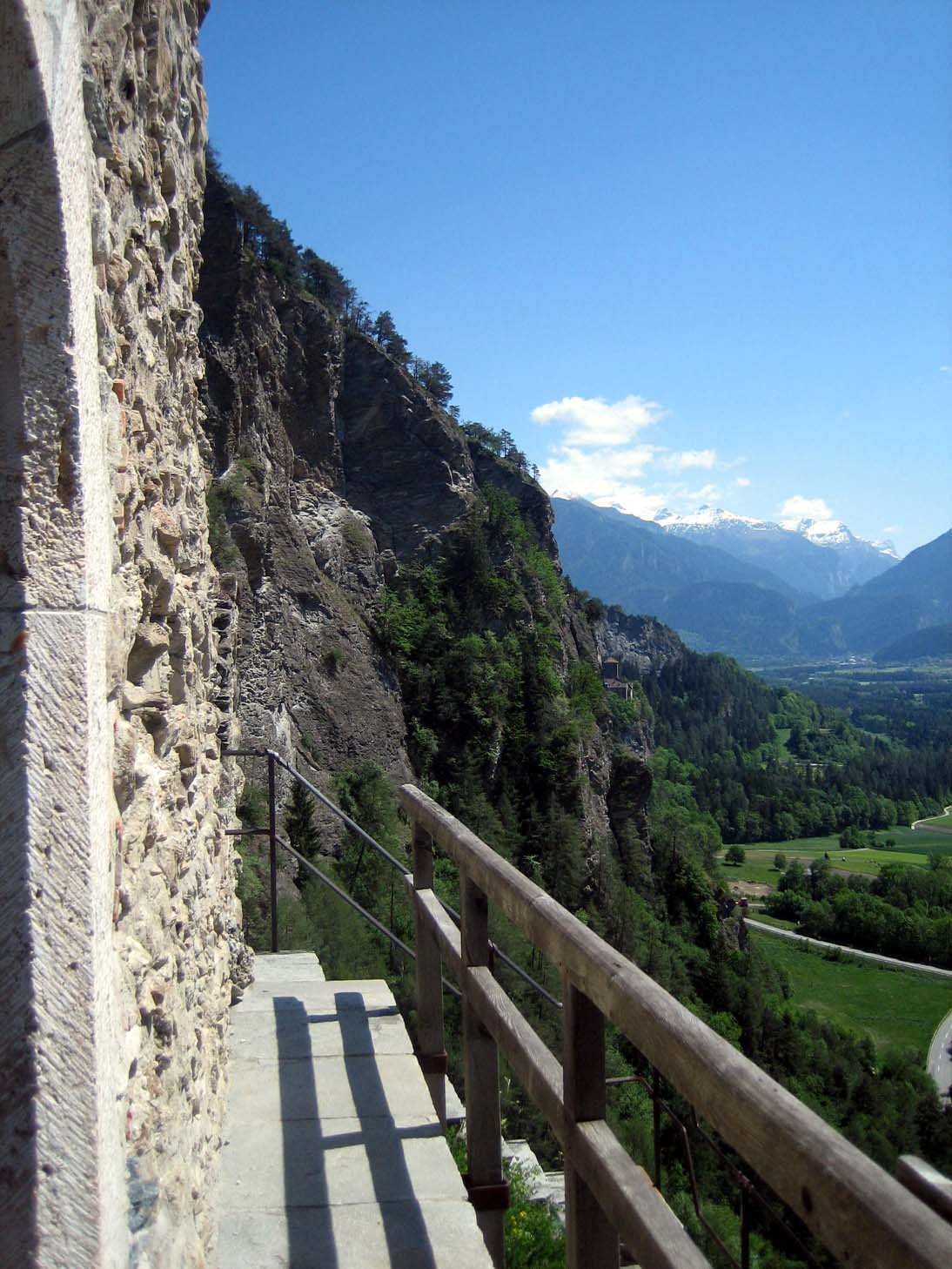
Staircase and walkway to the castle door

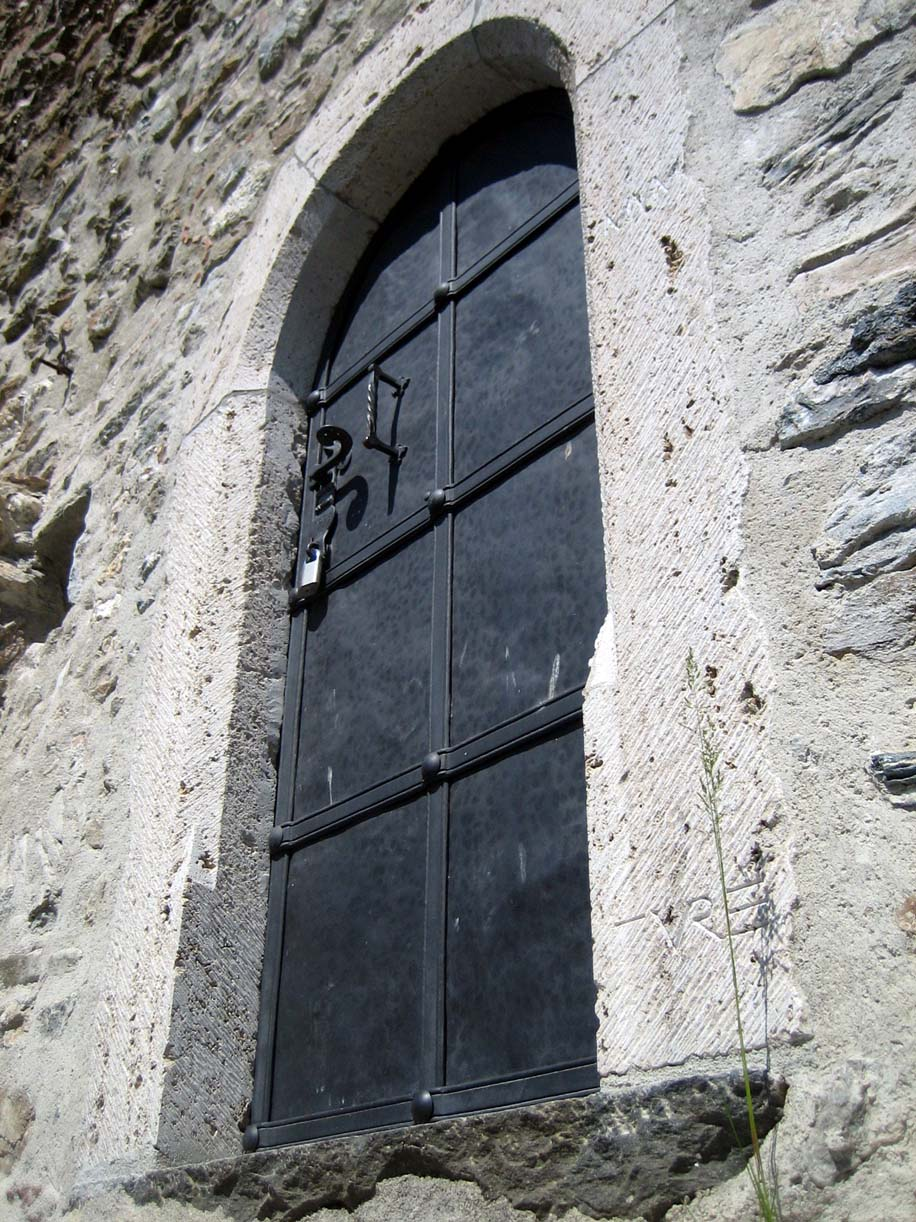
Door added after restoration of the tower

== See also ==
- List of castles in Switzerland
