= Lüschgrat =

Mountain in Switzerland

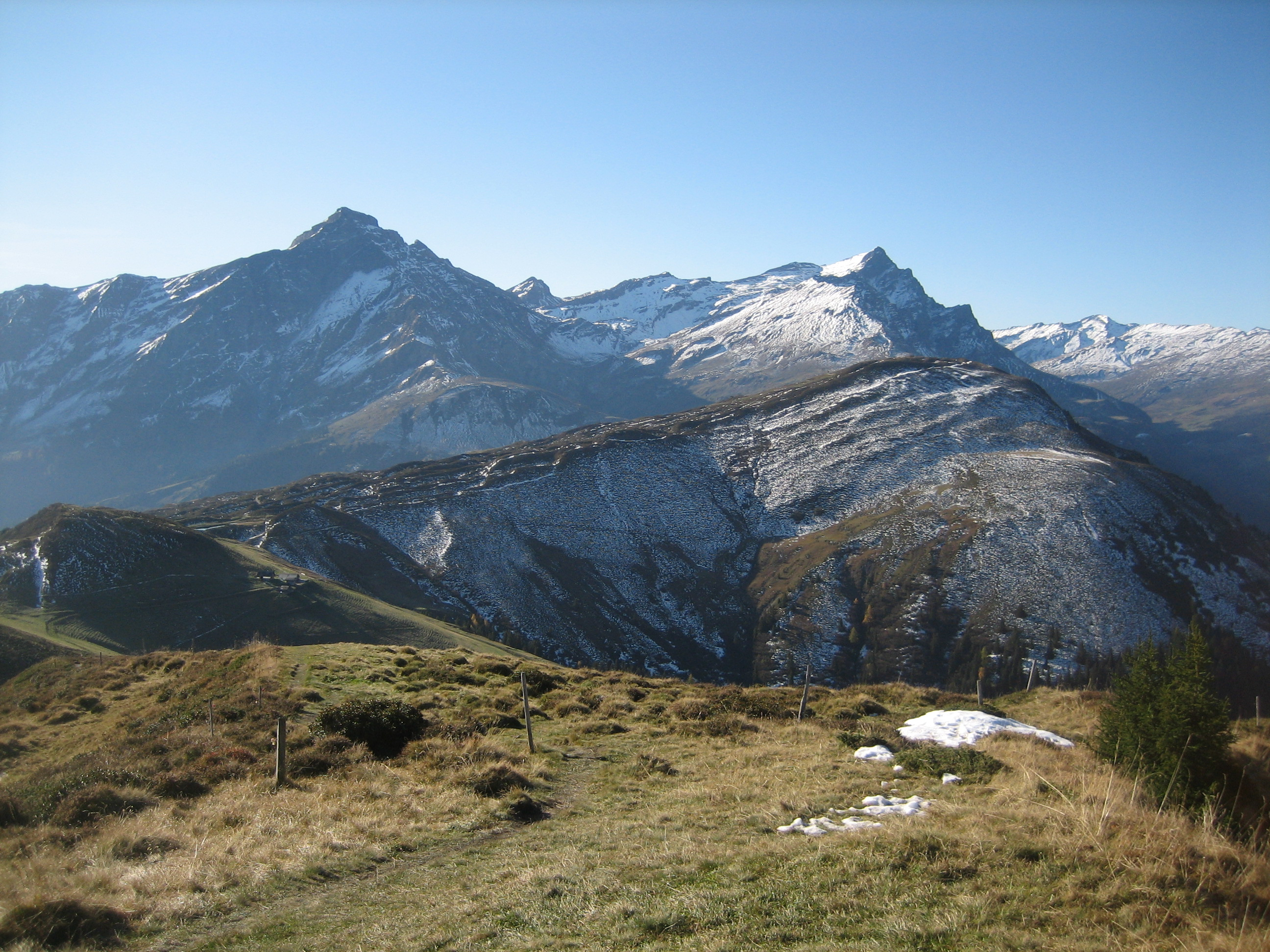
- The Lüschgrat with Piz Beverin and the Bruschghorn in background. View from the Tguma (north side)

Highest point
- Elevation: 2,178 m (7,146 ft)
- Prominence: 332 m (1,089 ft)
- Coordinates: 46°42′6″N 9°20′44″E

Geography
- Location within Switzerland
- Location: Graubünden, Switzerland
- Parent range: Lepontine Alps

The Lüschgrat is a mountain of the Swiss Lepontine Alps, located between Safien and Thusis in the canton of Graubünden. With a height of 2,178 metres above the sea level, it is the culminating point of the range north of the Glas Pass. There's a trail that leads to the summit.
