= Hasensprung Castle =

Ruined castle in Switzerland

- Burg Hasensprung
- Pratval village, Domleschg
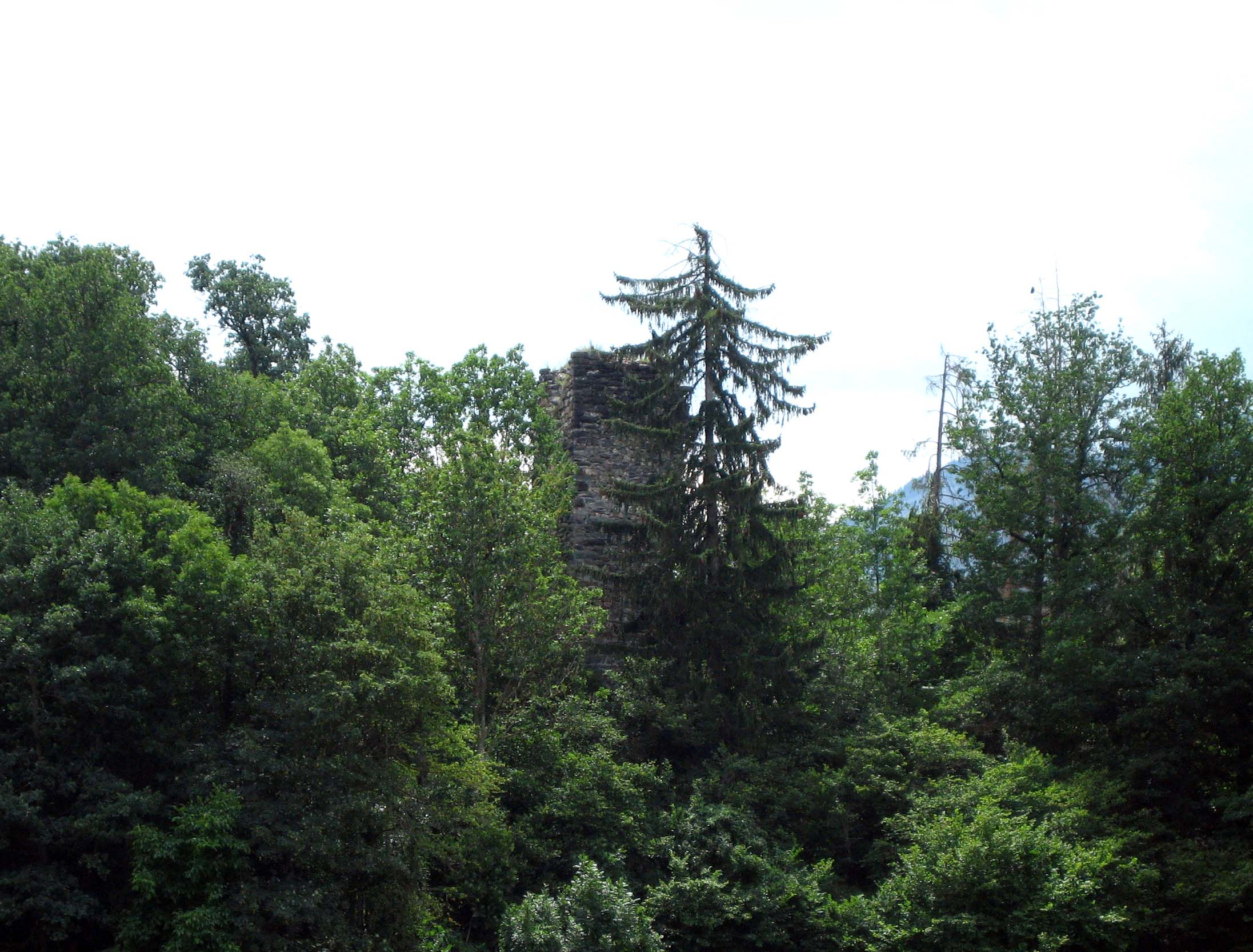
- Ruins of Hasensprung

Site information
- Type: hill castle
- Code: CH-GR
- Condition: ruin

Location
- Coordinates: 46°43′53″N 9°26′38.3″E
- Height: 690 m above the sea

Site history
- Built: between 1200 and 1300
- Materials: rubble stone

Hasensprung Castle (German: Burg Hasensprung) is a ruined castle in the municipality of Domleschg in the Viamala Region of the canton of Graubünden in Switzerland.

== History ==
Almost nothing is known about the history of this castle. It was probably built in the 13th century by the Vaz family. When the family died out in 1338, their estates in the region were inherited by the Counts of Werdenberg-Sargans. According to the chronicler Aegidius Tschudi the castle was owned by the Counts in the 15th century and was destroyed in 1451 during a war between the residents of the Schams valley and Werdenberg-Sargans.

Hasensprung hill was mentioned in the 14th century and in 1498 there was a mention of Hasensprung vineyard in the area.

== Castle site ==
The castle is located in heavy brush on top of Hasensprung hill. The castle site occupies an area of about 18 m × 30 m (59 ft × 98 ft). On the eastern end of the site the collapsed ruins of a four-story tower have been mostly overgrown. The western end of the site has the only part of the castle still standing, the northern corner of another tower with three windows. Traces of the chimney for the tower's fireplaces are still visible on the walls.

== Gallery ==
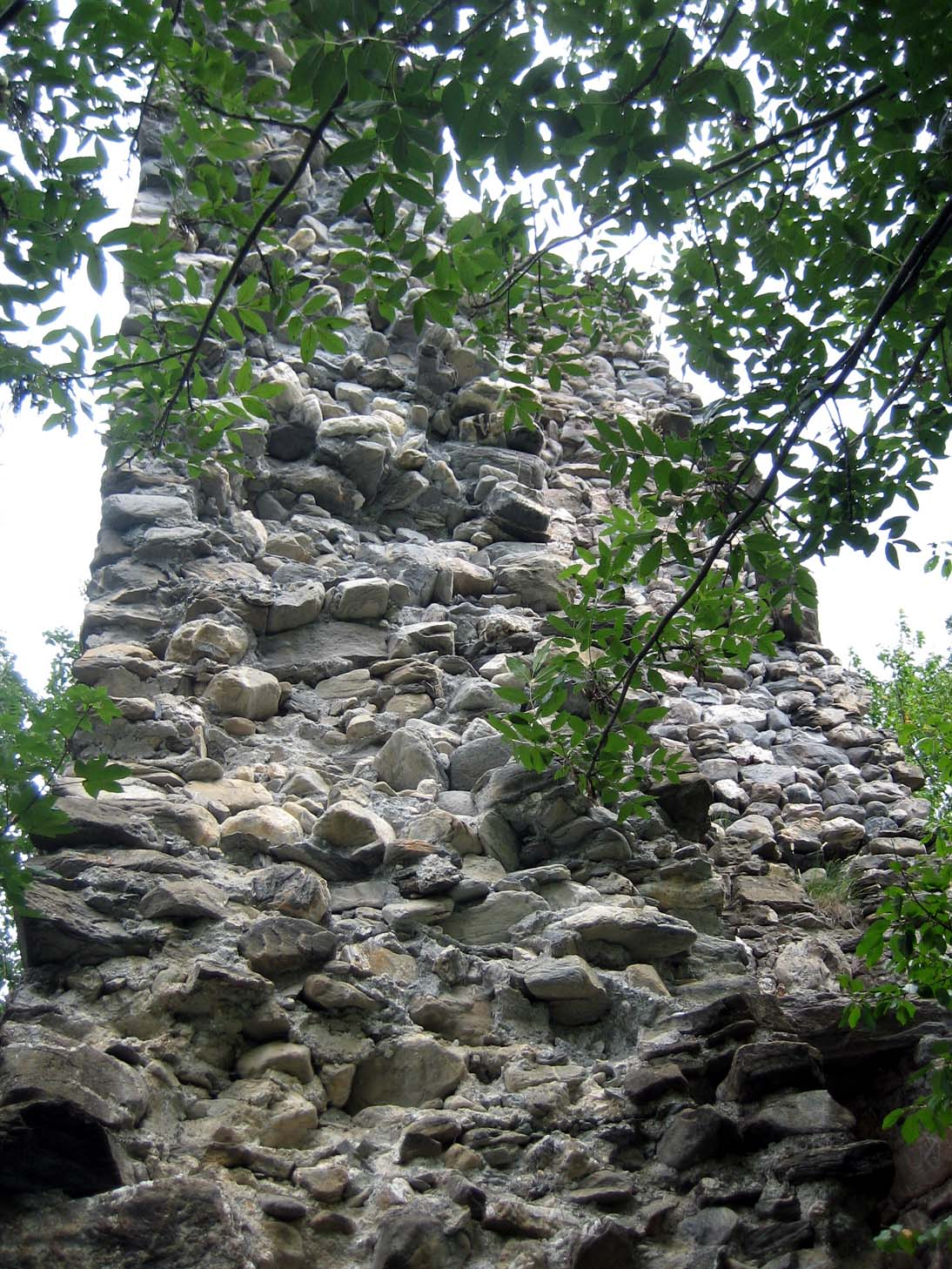
Ruins of the southern wall

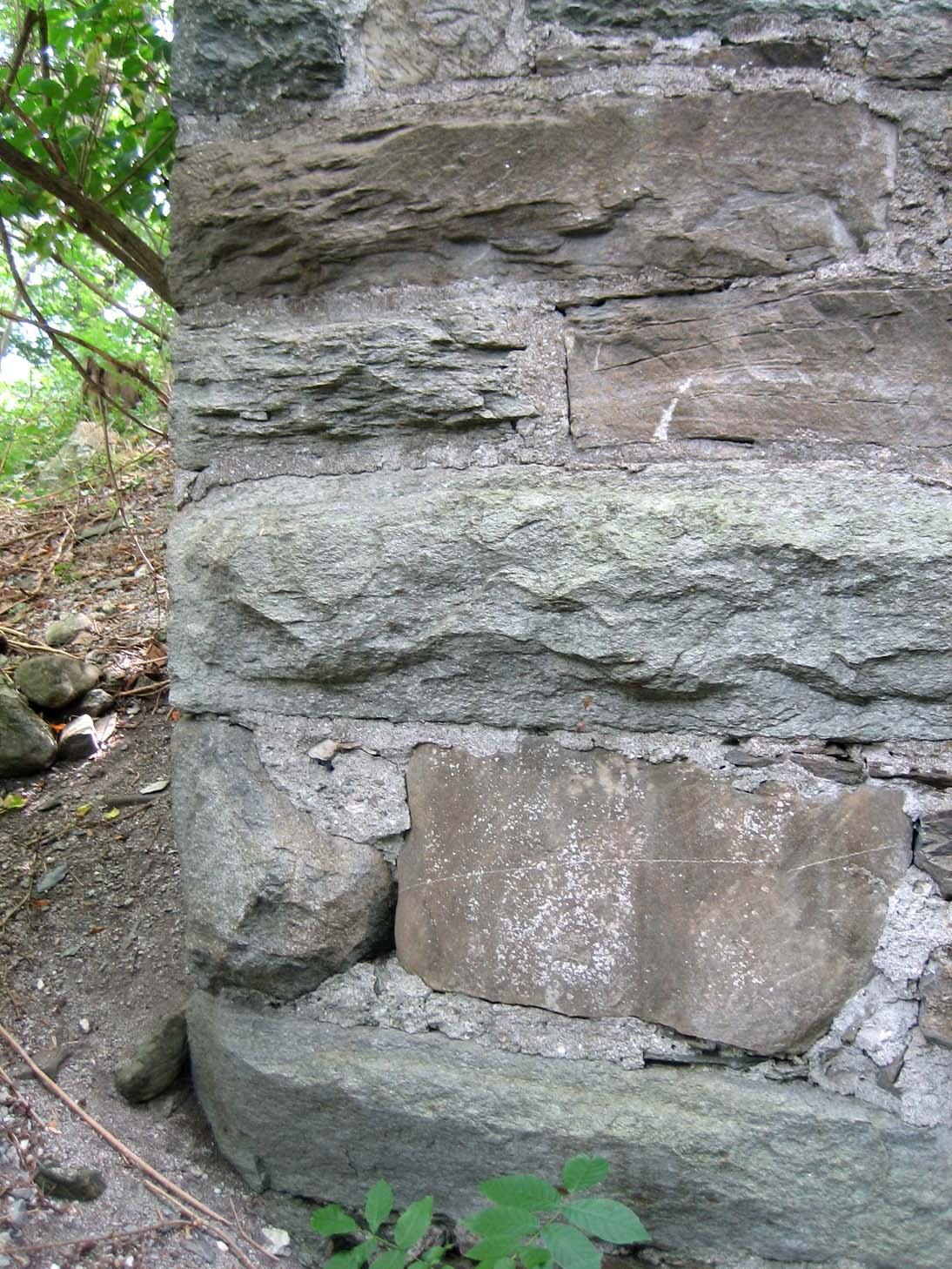
North-east corner

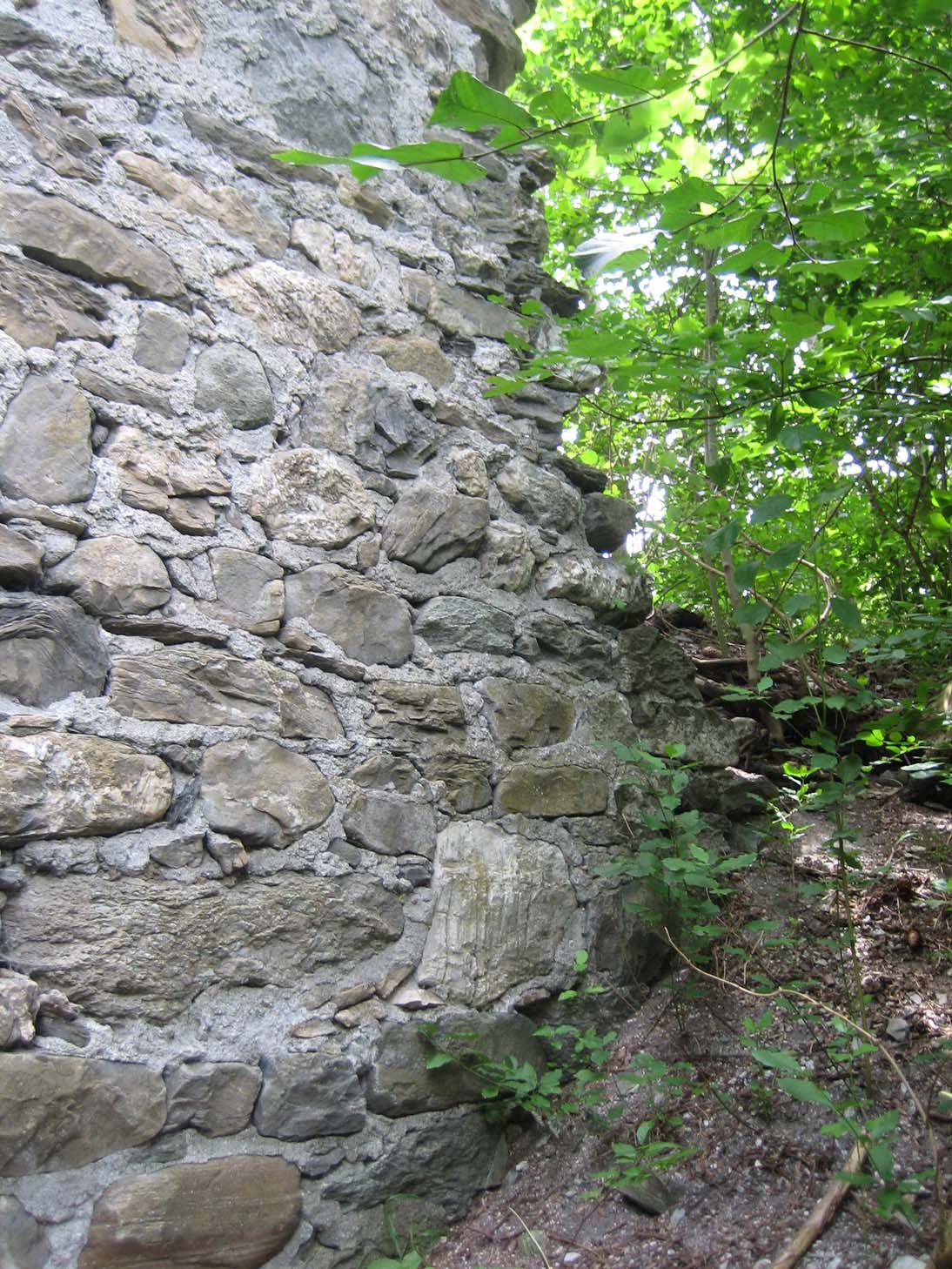
North corner

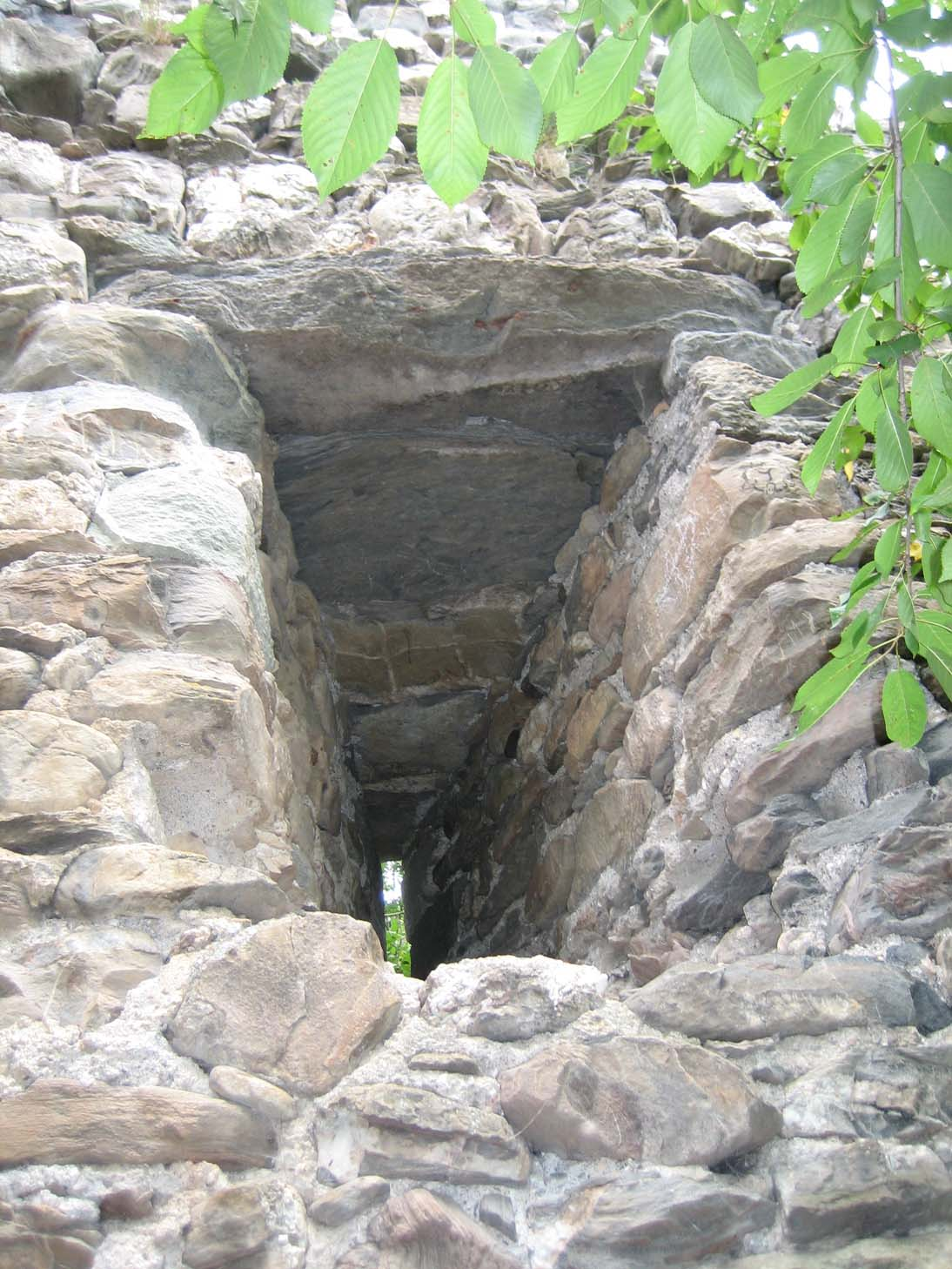
Castle window

== See also ==
- List of castles in Switzerland
