= Neu-Süns Castle =

Ruined castle in Switzerland

- Canova, Neu-Sins
- Paspels
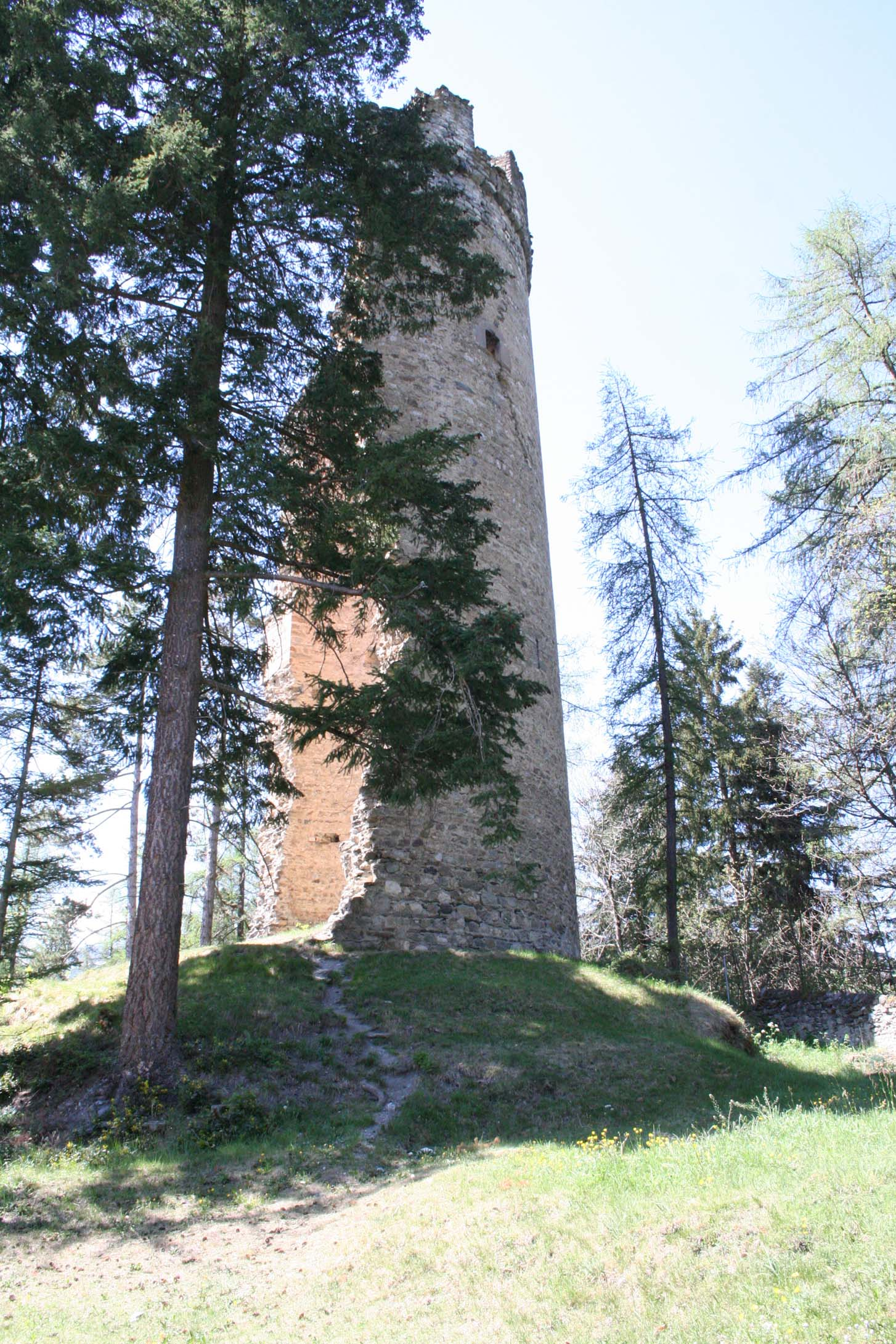
- Ruins of the round tower of Neu-Süns Castle

Site information
- Type: hill castle
- Code: CH-GR
- Condition: ruin

Location
- Location within Canton of Graubünden Location within Switzerland
- Coordinates: 46°44′39″N 9°26′52″E
- Height: 815 m above the sea

Site history
- Built: between 1250 and 1300

Garrison information
- Occupants: ministeriales

Neu-Süns Castle, Neu-Sins Castle or Canova (German: Burg Neu-Süns) is a ruined castle in the municipality of Domleschg in the Viamala Region of the canton of Graubünden in Switzerland.

== History ==
The castle was probably built in between 1250 and 1300, though the earliest reference to it is from 1337. At that time the castle was known as nüwer Sünnes. It was probably built by the powerful Vaz family to expand the territory controlled by nearby Alt-Süns Castle. Traditionally it was believed that the alternative name Canova was the original name and referred to a local noble family. However the first mention of the turri de Canofa (Canova is Romansh for new house) appears in 1390.

When the Vaz family died out in 1338, their estates in the area were inherited by the Counts of Werdenberg-Sargans. In 1392 Anna von Rhäzüns received the castle from her husband Count Johann von Werdenberg-Sargans. In 1437 the two castles were specifically mentioned in a treaty between Heinrich von Werdenberg-Sargans and the Cantons of Schwyz and Glarus. The southern wall of the tower was intentionally collapsed by the victorious attackers in 1451 during a war between the residents of the Schams valley against Werdenberg-Sargans. As part of the peace treaty, the Counts could rebuild the castle if the League of God's House gave their approval. As they were never able to secure permission, the castle was allowed to fall into ruin. During the 16th century, the ruins were mentioned as a landmark as was the nearby farm. In 1574 Andreas von Salis zu Reitberg inherited the farm and the ruined castle. Today the property is owned by the Planta family.

== Castle site ==
The castle had an uncommon round donjon that was five stories tall. The southern side of the tower was destroyed during the 1451 war, but the northern side remains intact and still reaches its original height. The tower walls are up to 1.5 m (4.9 ft) thick. Fireplaces, two garderobes and sitting places by the windows show that the third and fourth stories were permanently inhabited. The top of the tower was crowned with crenellations and a sloping wooden roof that was protected by the stone battlements.

The tower was surrounded by a stone ring wall that was about 3 m (9.8 ft) larger than the tower. The rectangular outer bailey was to the south-west of the round tower. It was defended by steep slopes and a ditch. Very little of the ring wall or outer bailey still remain.

== See also ==
- List of castles in Switzerland
