= Obertagstein Castle =

- Burg Obertagstein
- Thusis
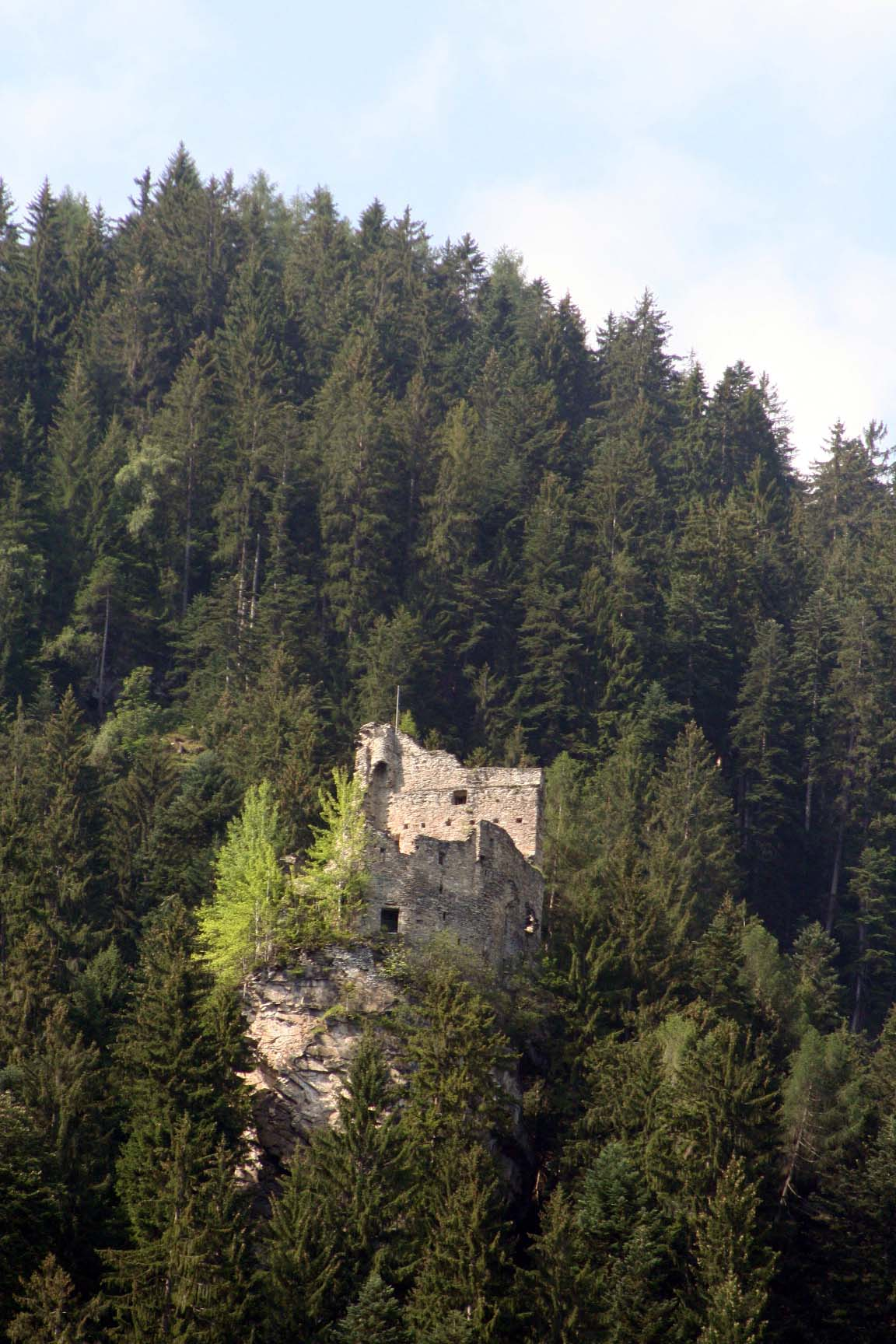
- Burg Obertagstein near Thusis

Site information
- Type: hill castle
- Code: CH-GR
- Condition: ruin

Location
- Coordinates: 46°41′6″N 9°25′40″E
- Height: 1,150 m above the sea

Site history
- Built: about 1300

Obertagstein Castle is a ruined castle in the municipality of Thusis of the Canton of Graubünden in Switzerland.

== History ==
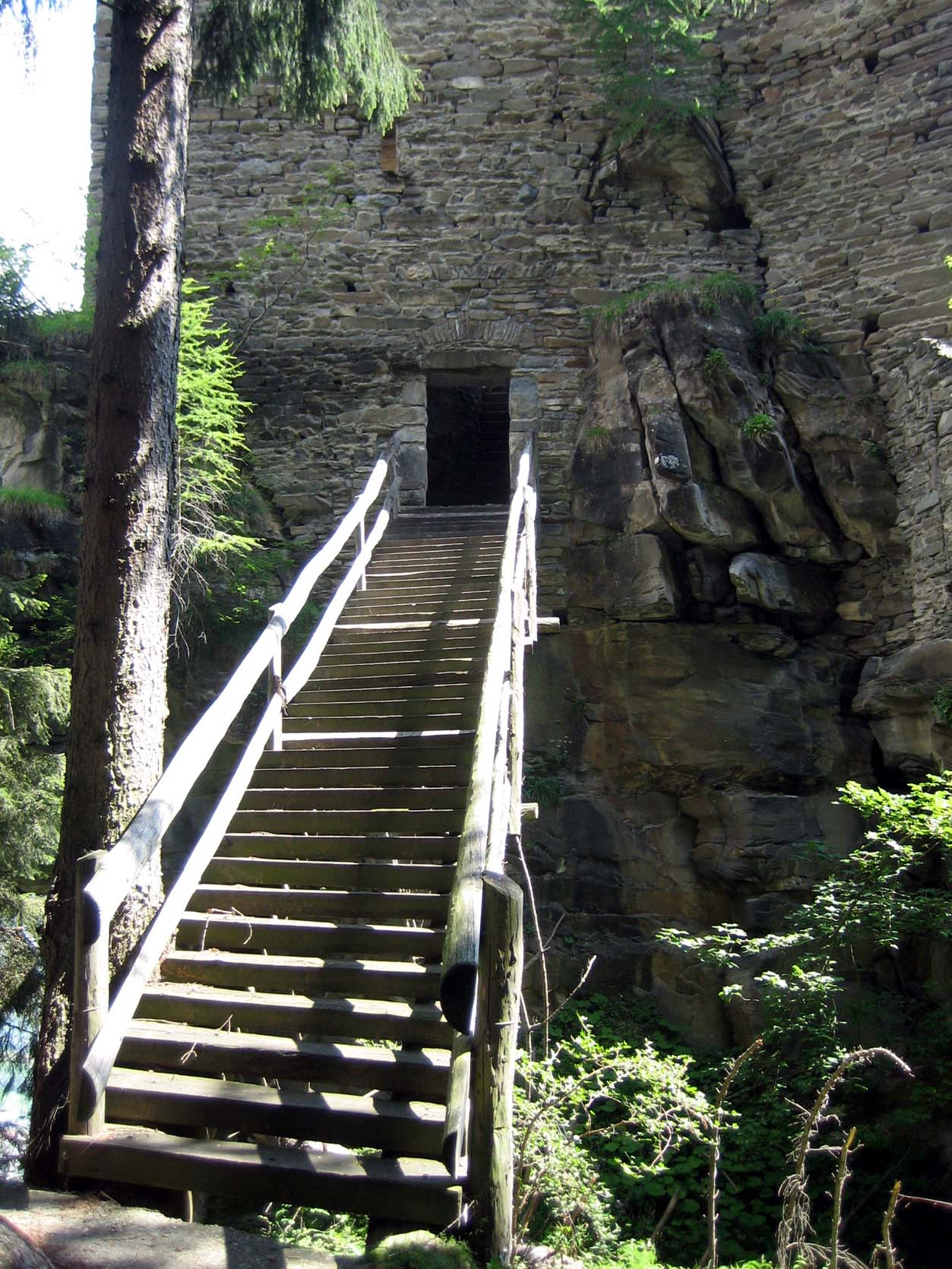
Modern bridge into the castle

The castle was probably built in the 13th century by the Masein/Rialt family near Untertagstein Castle. In 1316 Margareta von Rialt left all her properties in Tagstein to her nieces. The first mention of a castle in the area is in 1322, but it probably refers to Untertagstein in Masein. In 1322 the male line of the Rialt family died out and it was inherited by the Bärenburg family. The Bärenburg family were ministerialis, or unfree knights in service to a higher noble, to Vaz family. After the extinction of the Vaz family in 1337, they became vassals of the Counts of Toggenburg and the castle was given to the Tumb family. They began to refer to themselves as von Tagstein, but again probably referring to Untertagstein. In 1385 and 1387 Untertagstein is specifically mentioned.

The castle was originally built with an outer gate at the south-west corner of the castle. This gate led to narrow path that wrapped around the southern side of the castle, passed through a middle gate and then led to an inner gate on the east side. At some point in the castle's history the western wall at the main cistern collapsed. The cistern was abandoned and the hole in the wall became a new gate. The old outer gate was then walled up.

In the 15th century the castle was gutted by a fire and abandoned. In 1512 the ruins of Obertagstein were recorded in the property of Cazis Priory. As early as the 16th century the castle was visited by hikers who carved their initials and dates into the plaster walls.

== Castle site ==
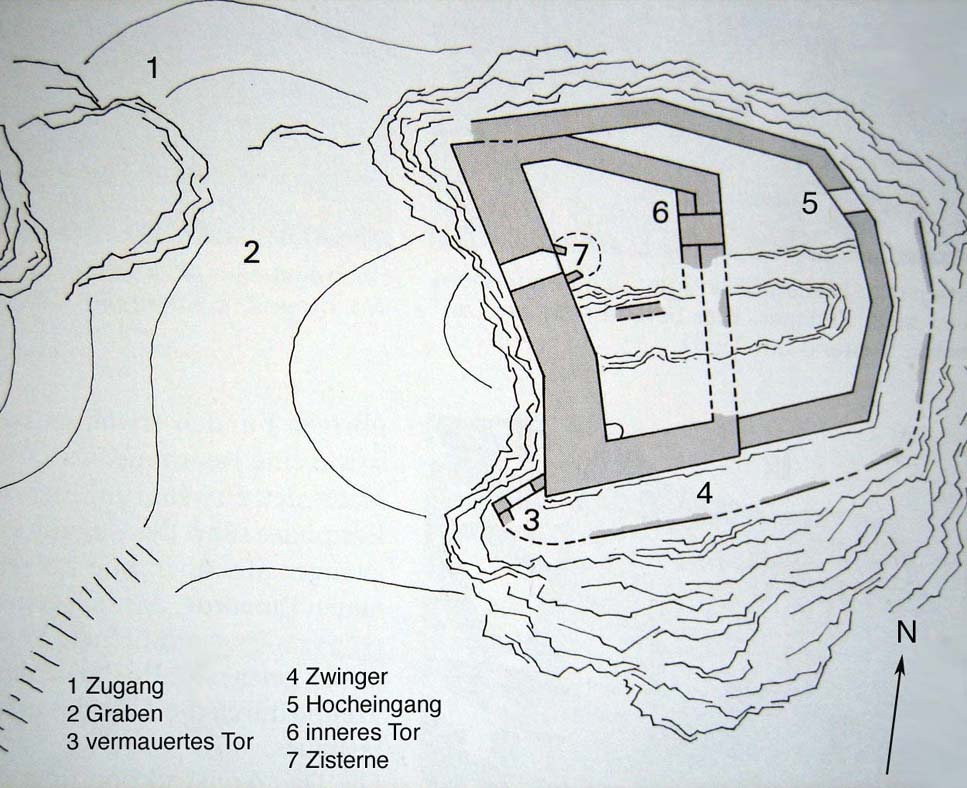
Floorplan of the castle

The castle occupies the entire top of a small rock outcropping south of Thusis. The castle complex is about 15 m × 15 m (49 ft × 49 ft). Storage buildings and workshops were probably built on the mountain side of the outcropping and were separated from the castle by a ditch. Above the ditch was a ring wall that is mostly still standing. During construction the trunks of two trees were left standing and incorporated into the wall. Across a small courtyard, the palas filled the eastern end of the complex. The original entrance into the castle was on the east side of the palas, but after the cistern collapse the outer gate was sealed. The new western entrance had a wooden bridge over the ditch.

== Gallery ==
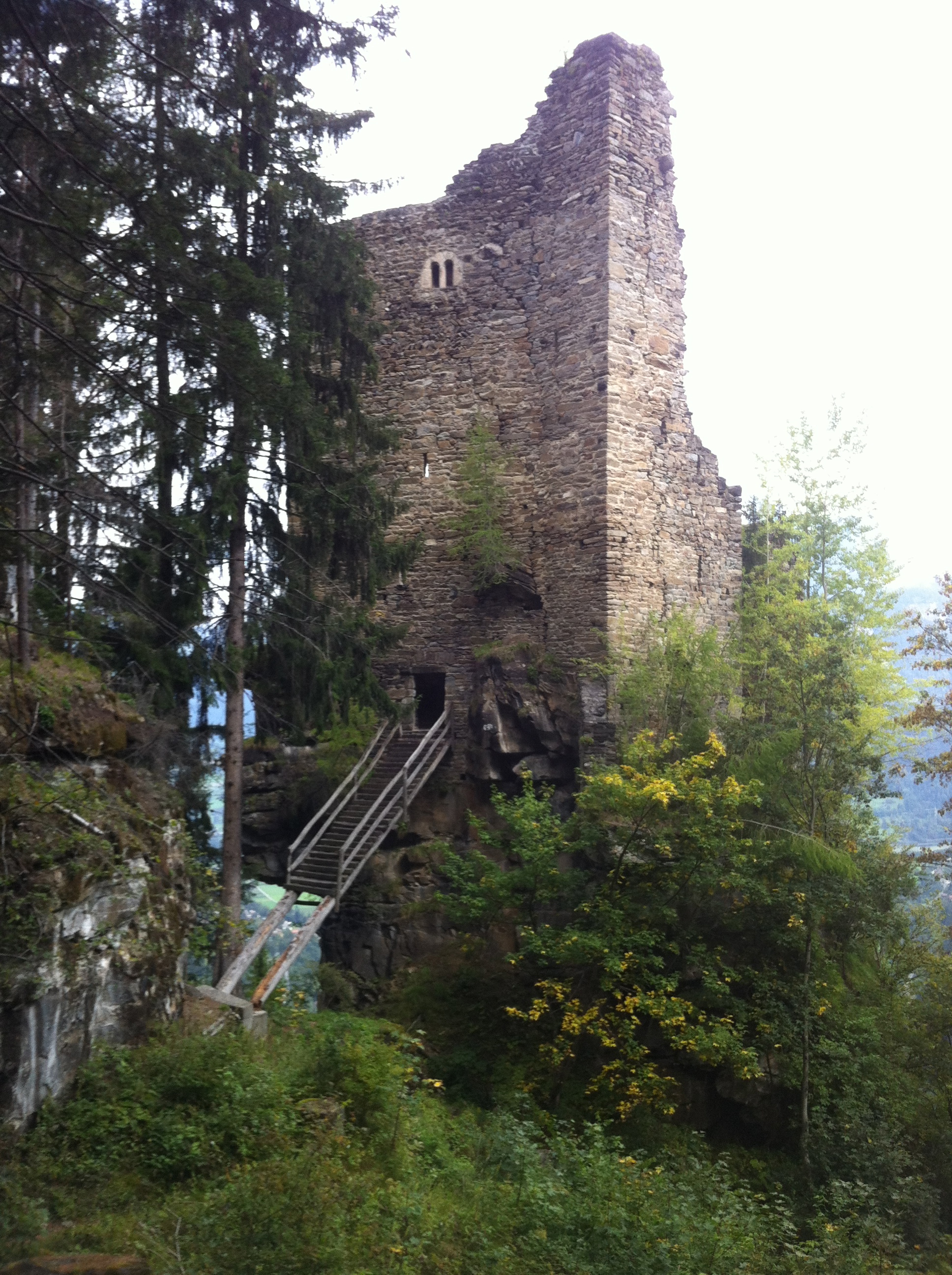
View of the castle

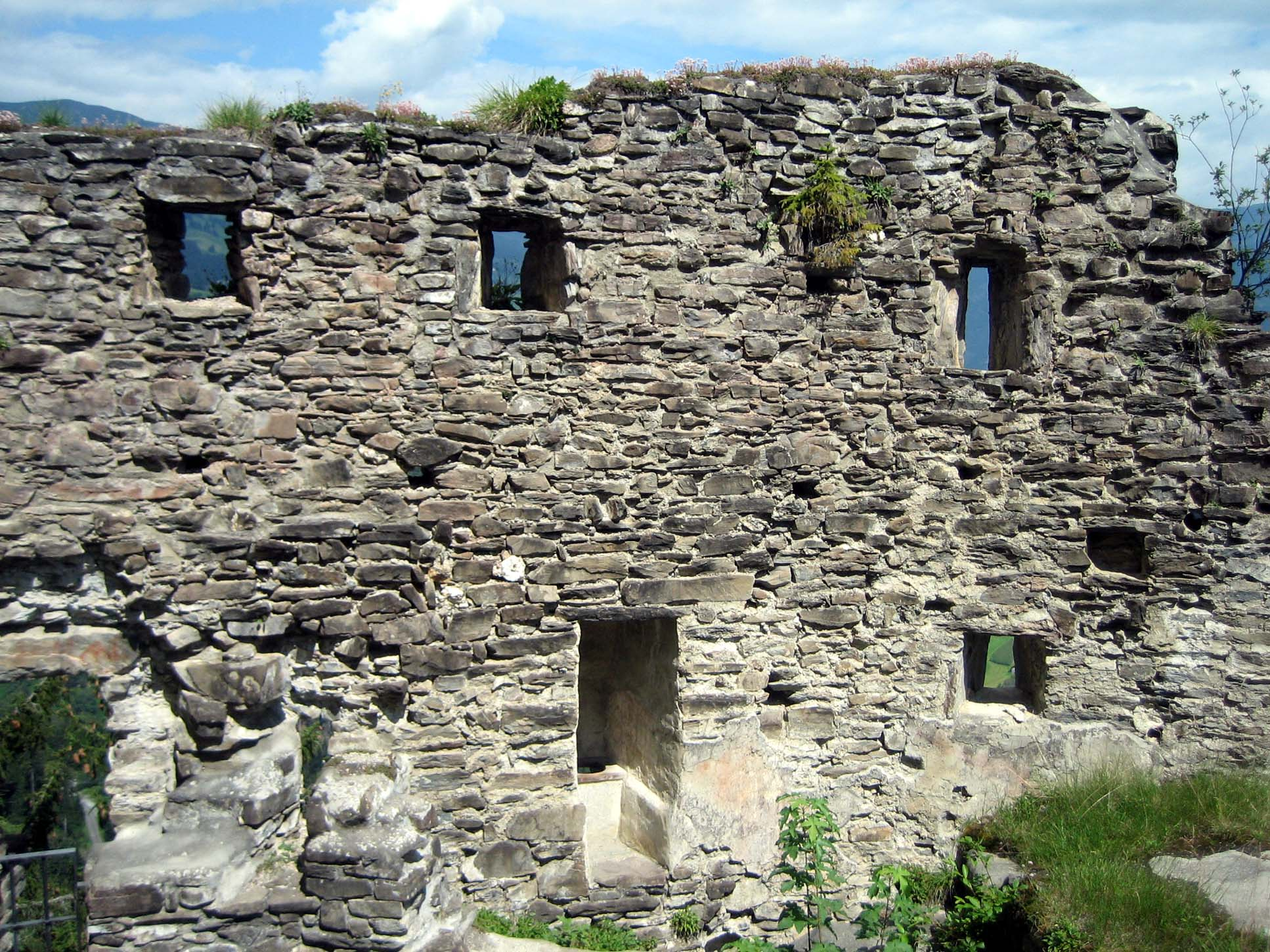
North wall

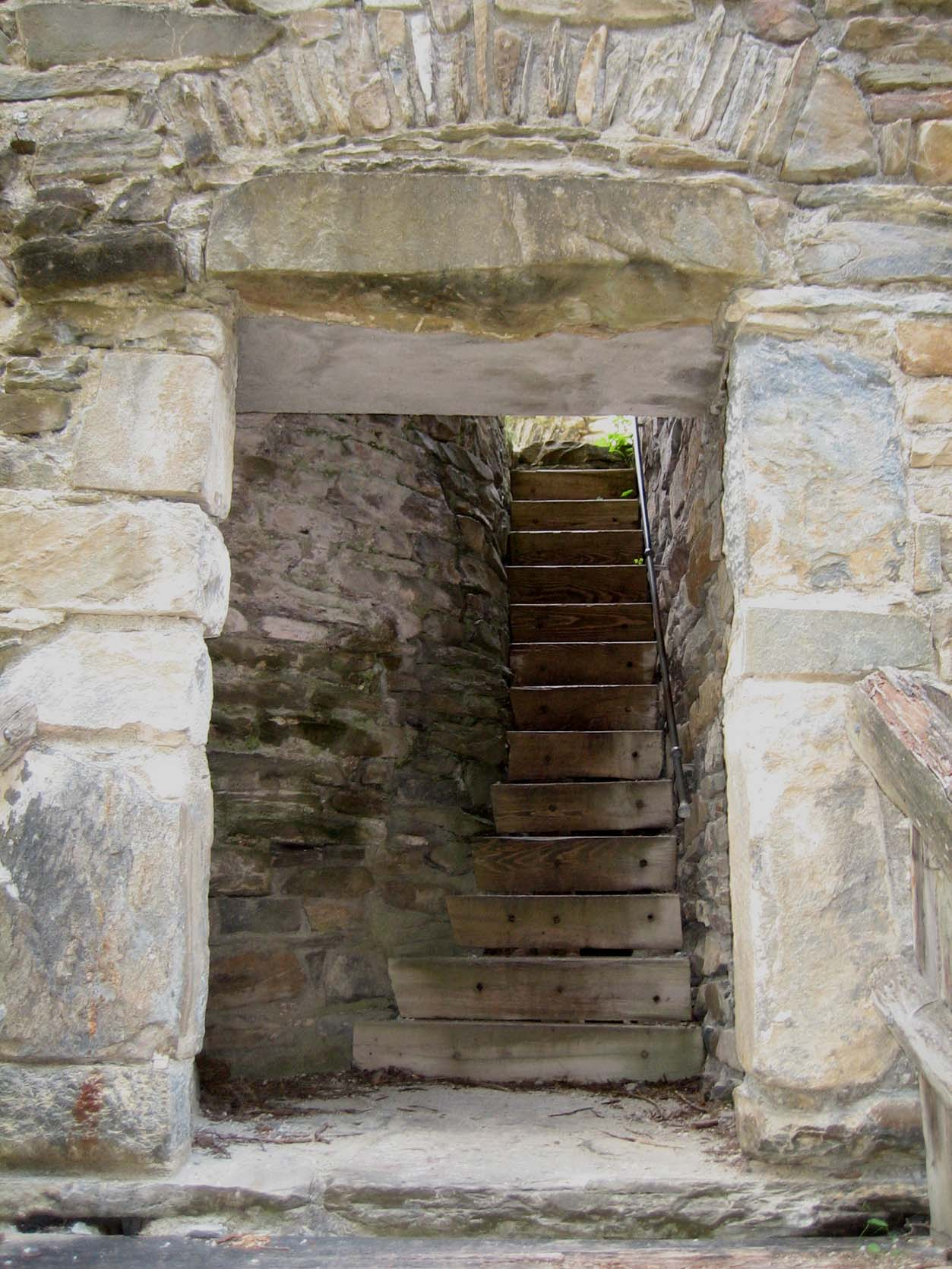
Main entrance into the castle

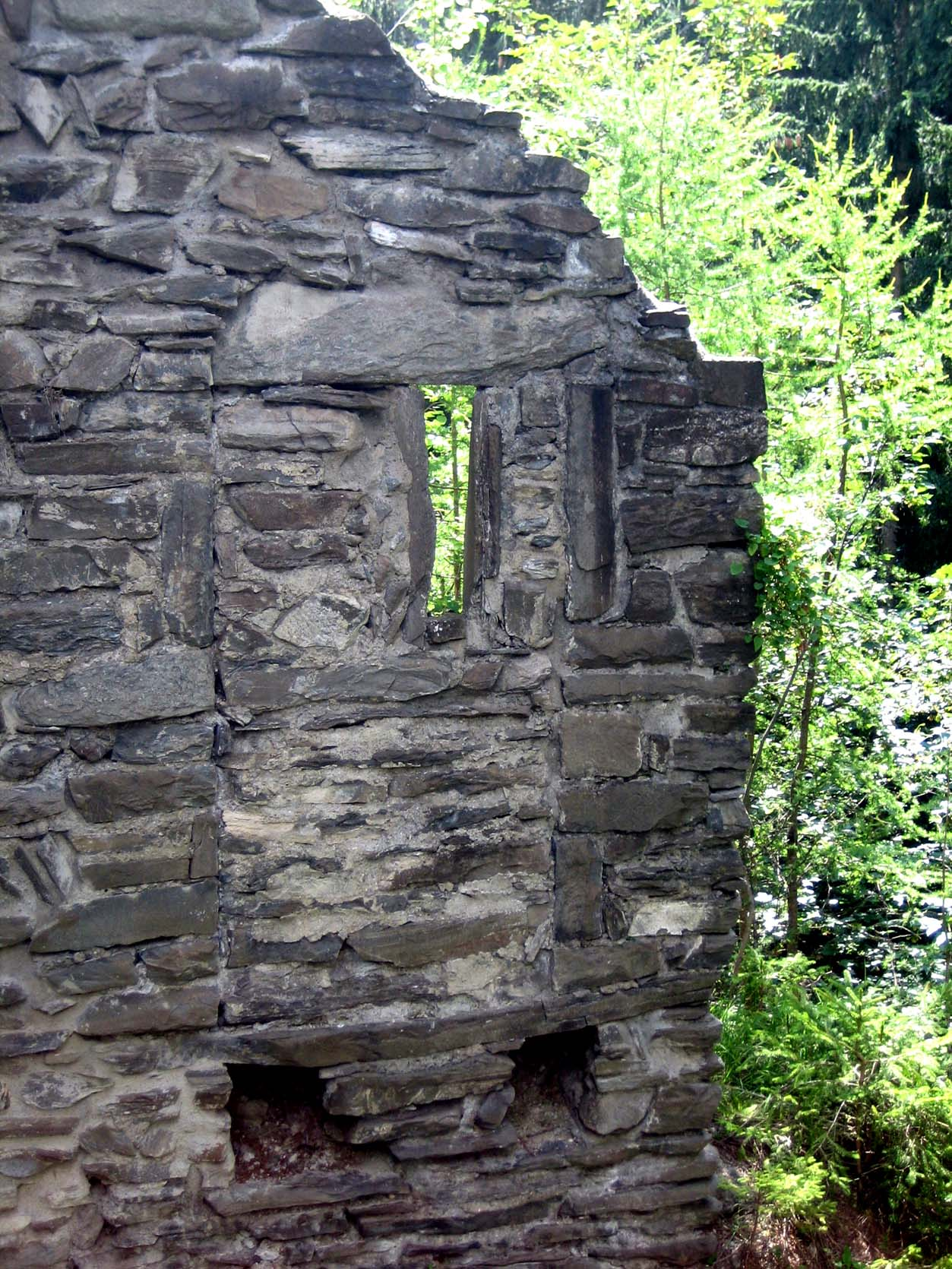
Sealed old outer gate

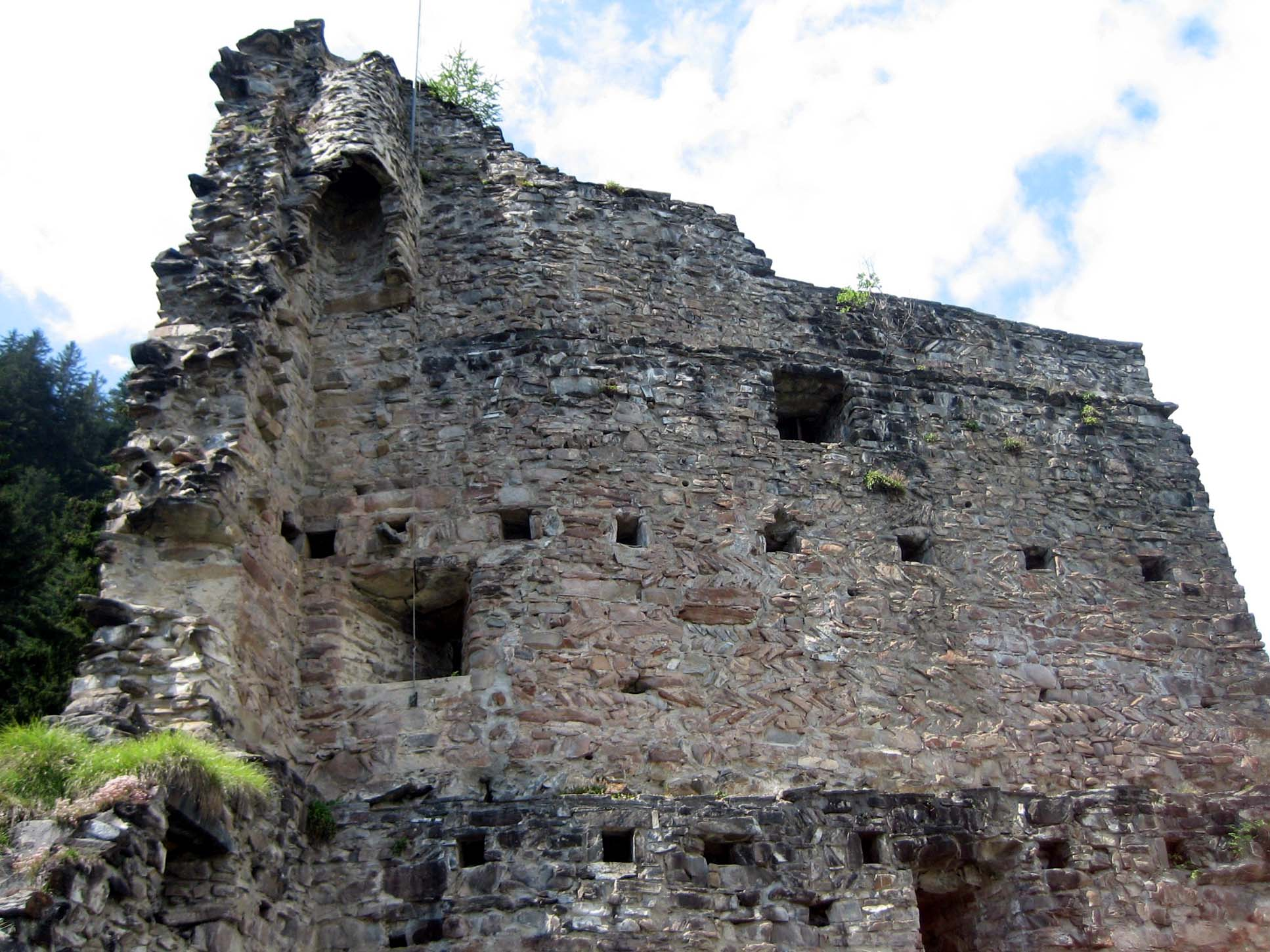
Ring wall from the courtyard

== See also ==
- List of castles in Switzerland
