= Domleschg =

- Municipality
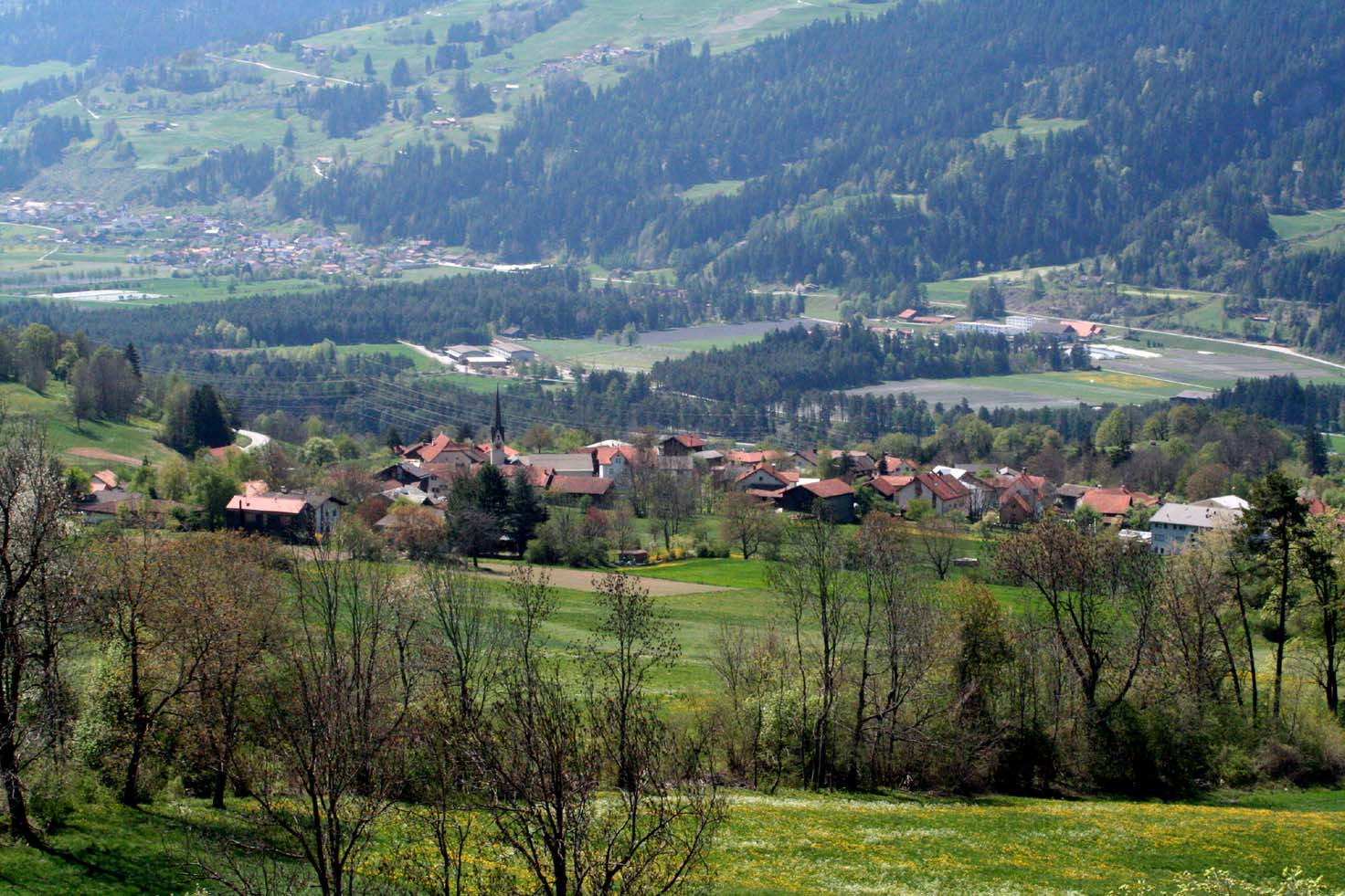
- Paspels village in Domleschg

- Flag Coat of arms
- Location of Domleschg
- Location within Switzerland Location within Canton of Grisons
- Coordinates: 46°43′N 9°26′E
- Country: Switzerland
- Canton: Grisons
- District: Viamala

Government
  - Mayor: Gemeindepräsident; Werner Natter

Area
  - Total: 45.93 km^{2} (17.73 sq mi)
- Elevation: 687 m (2,254 ft)

Population (Dec 2013)
  - Total: 1,941
  - Density: 42.26/km^{2} (109.5/sq mi)
- Time zone: UTC+01:00 (CET)
  - Summer (DST): UTC+02:00 (CEST)
- Postal code: 7415-7418
- SFOS number: 3673
- ISO 3166 code: CH-GR
- Surrounded by: Cazis, Fürstenau
- Website: www.domleschg.ch

Domleschg is a municipality in the Viamala Region in the Swiss canton of the Grisons. On 1 January 2015 the former municipalities of Almens, Paspels, Pratval, Rodels and Tomils merged to form the new municipality of Domleschg.

== History ==
Almens is first mentioned in the first half of the 9th Century as de Lemenne. Paspels is first mentioned in 1237 as in villa Pascuals though the original record no longer exists. In 1246 it was mentioned as de Pascuals. Pratval is first mentioned in 1345 as Prau de Valle. Rodels is first mentioned in the mid-12th Century as ad Rautine. Tomils was created on 1 January 2009 through the merger of Feldis/Veulden, Scheid, Trans and Tumegl/Tomils.

== Geography ==
Based on the 2009 survey, the former municipalities that make up Domleschg had an area of 45.94 km^{2} (17.74 sq mi). Of this area, 16.59 km^{2} (6.41 mi^{2}) or 36.1% was used for agricultural purposes, while 22.66 km^{2} (8.75 mi^{2}) or 49.3% was forested. Of the rest of the land, 1.5 km^{2} (0.58 mi^{2}) or 3.3% was settled (buildings or roads), 0.33 km^{2} (0.13 mi^{2}) or 0.7% was either rivers or lakes and 4.88 km^{2} (1.88 mi^{2}) or 10.6% was unproductive land.

Of the built up area, housing and buildings made up 1.6% and transportation infrastructure made up 1.5%. Out of the forested land, 42.5% of the total land area is heavily forested and 4.9% is covered with orchards or small clusters of trees. Of the agricultural land, 5.1% is used for growing crops and 9.6% is pastures and 20.7% is used for alpine pastures. All the water in the municipality is flowing water. Of the unproductive areas, 8.9% is unproductive vegetation and 1.7% is too rocky for vegetation.

== Demographics ==
The total population of Domleschg (as of December 2020) is 2,160.

== Historic population ==
The historical population is given in the following chart:

== Heritage sites of national significance ==
The Church of S. Luregn/St. Lorenz in Paspels, the Chapel of S. Maria-Magdalena in the hamlet of Dusch, Rietberg Castle in Pratval, the church of St. Maria E Maurezzi, the early medieval church of St. Murezzi and Ortenstein Castle in Tomils are listed as Swiss heritage sites of national significance. The regions around Paspels and Tumegl /Tomils-Ortenstein as well as the village of Almens are all part of the Inventory of Swiss Heritage Sites.

The early medieval Church of S. Luregn/St. Lorenz was first mentioned in 1237. It was the parish church for the right side of the Hinterrhein valley. The Chapel of S. Maria-Magdalena was built in 1508 and was initially under the monastery of Churwalden. However, in the 16th Century, the hamlet of Dusch converted to the Reformation and therefore the chapel was also converted.

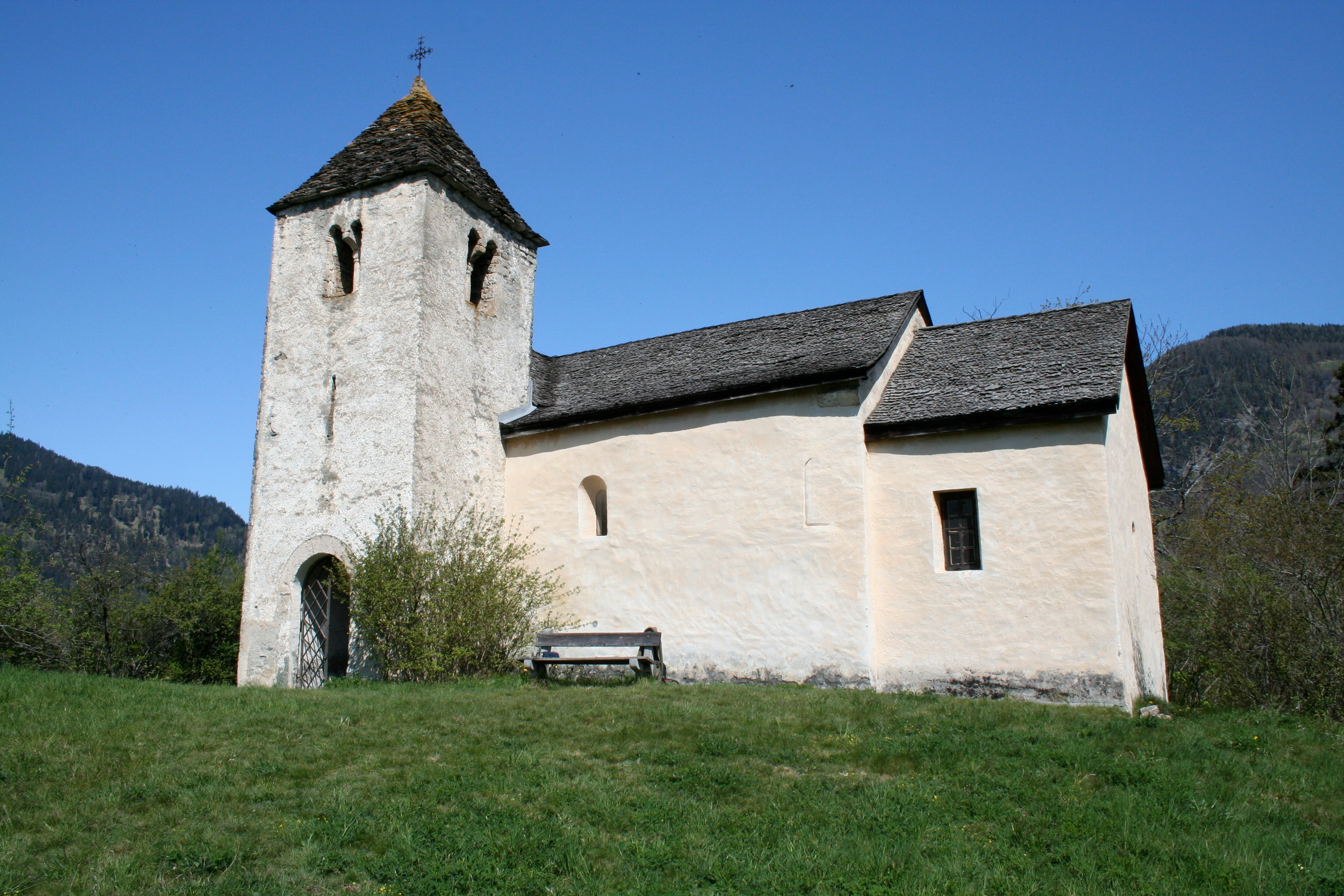
Chapel of St. Lorenz

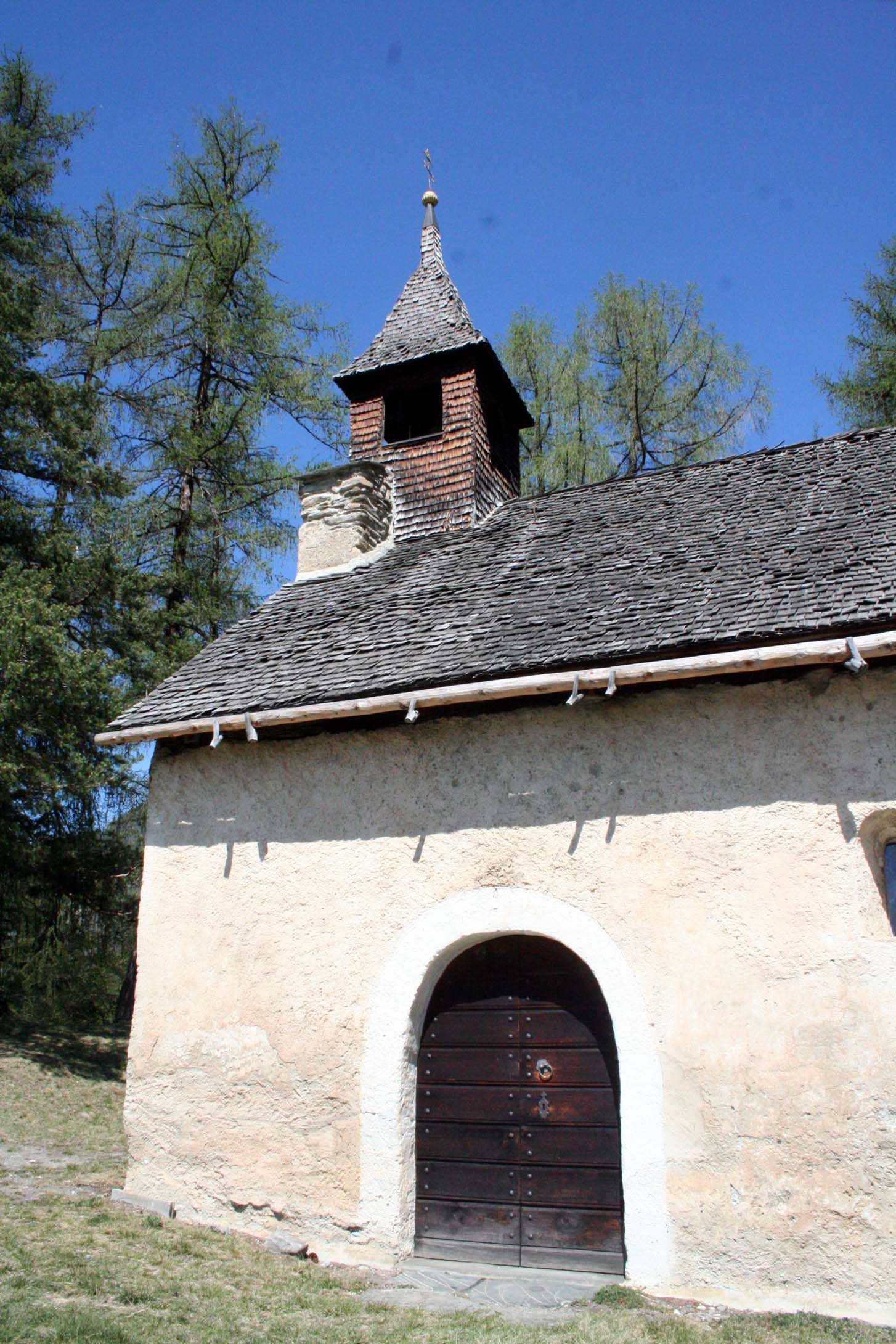
Chapel of St. Maria-Magdalena

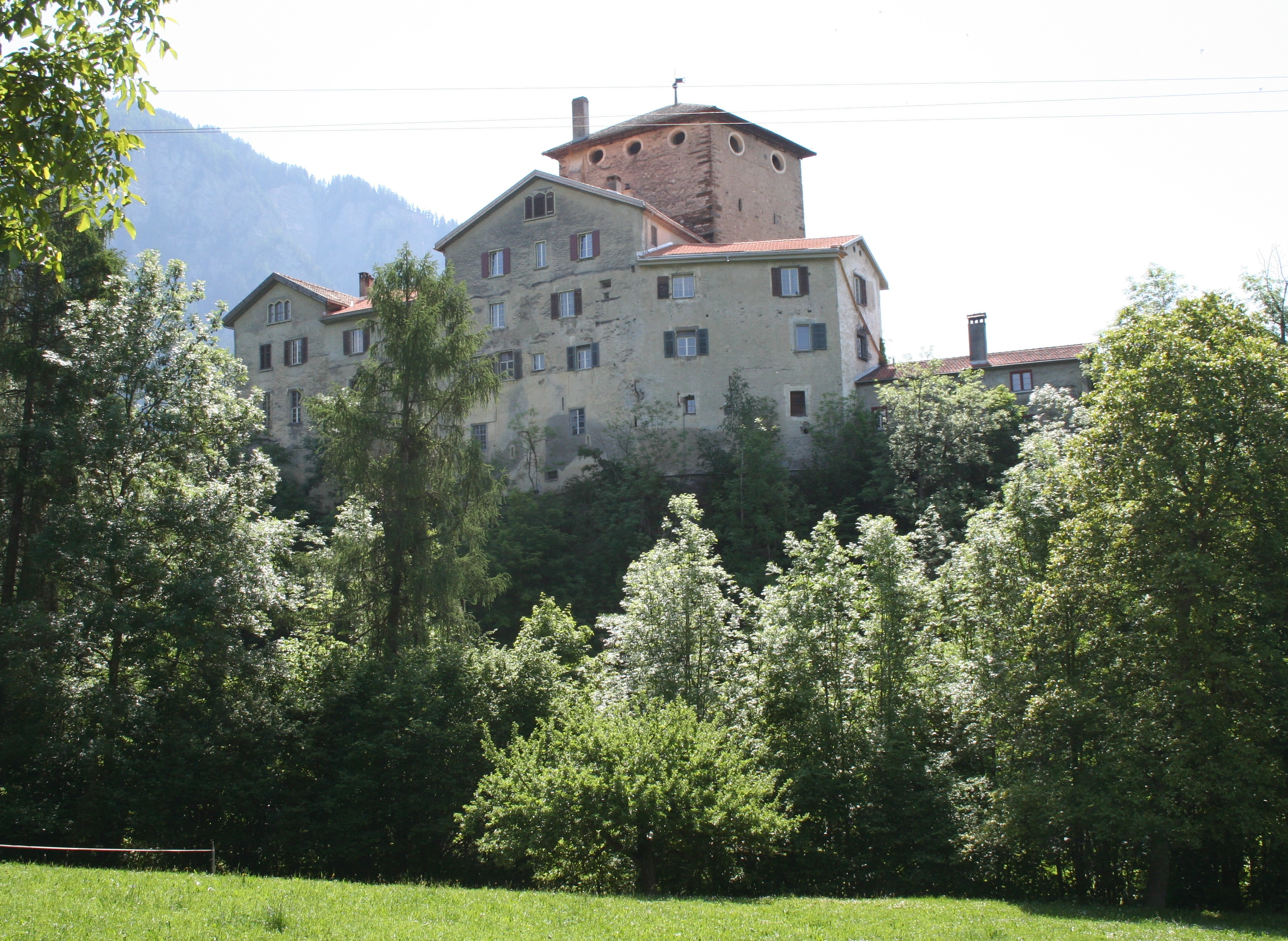
Rietberg Castle

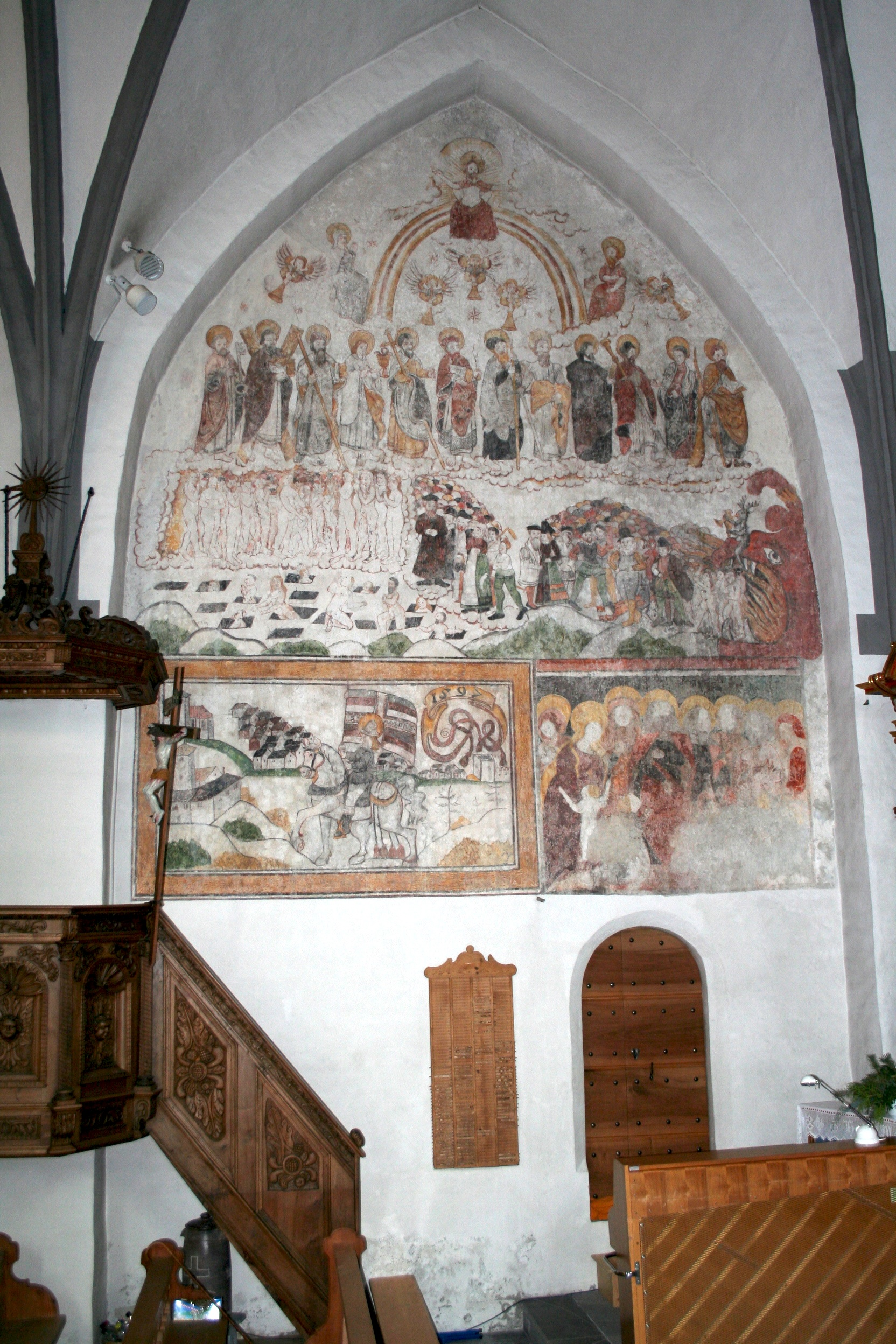
Interior of the Catholic Church of St. Maria E Maurezzi

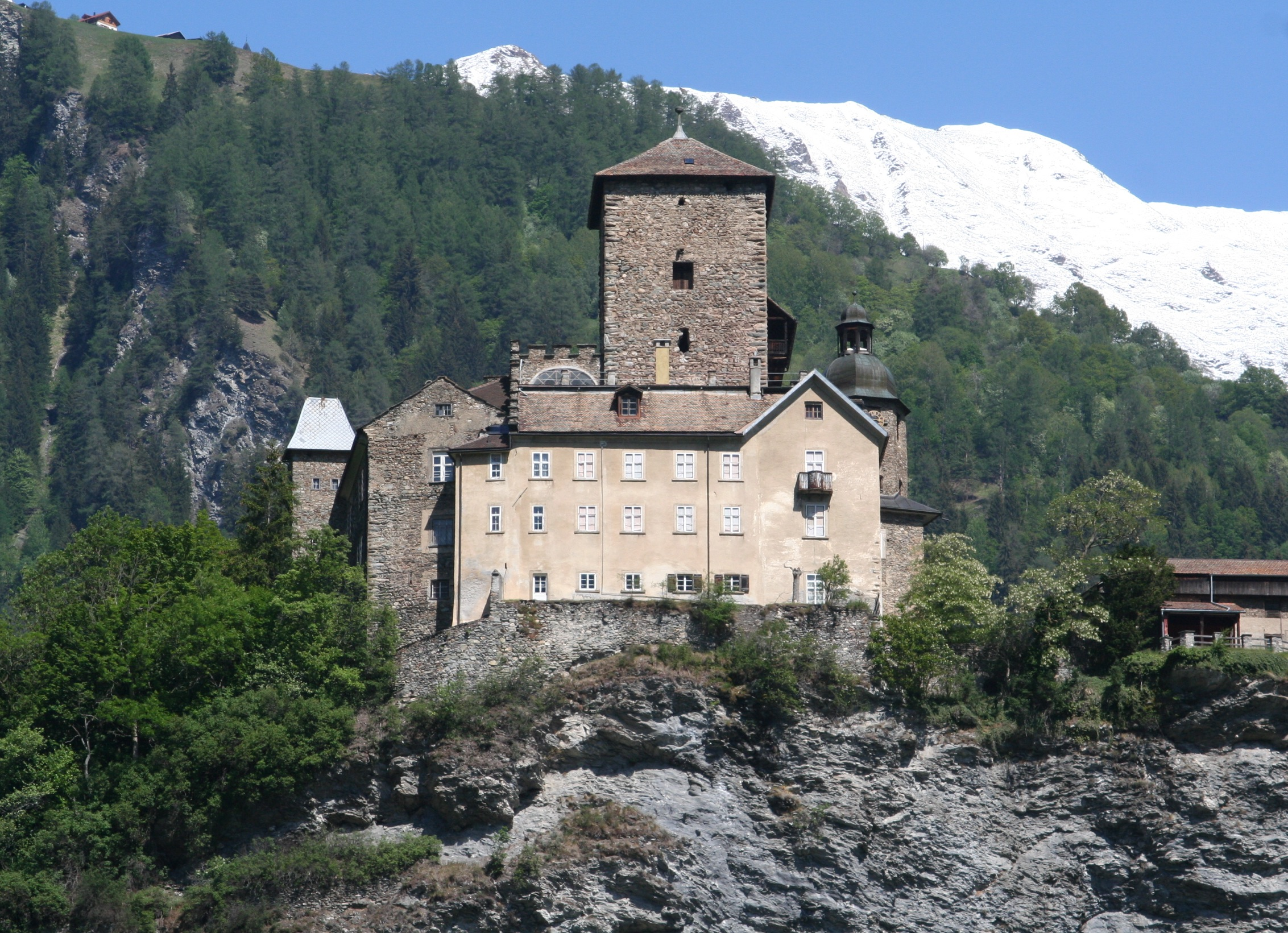
Ortenstein Castle

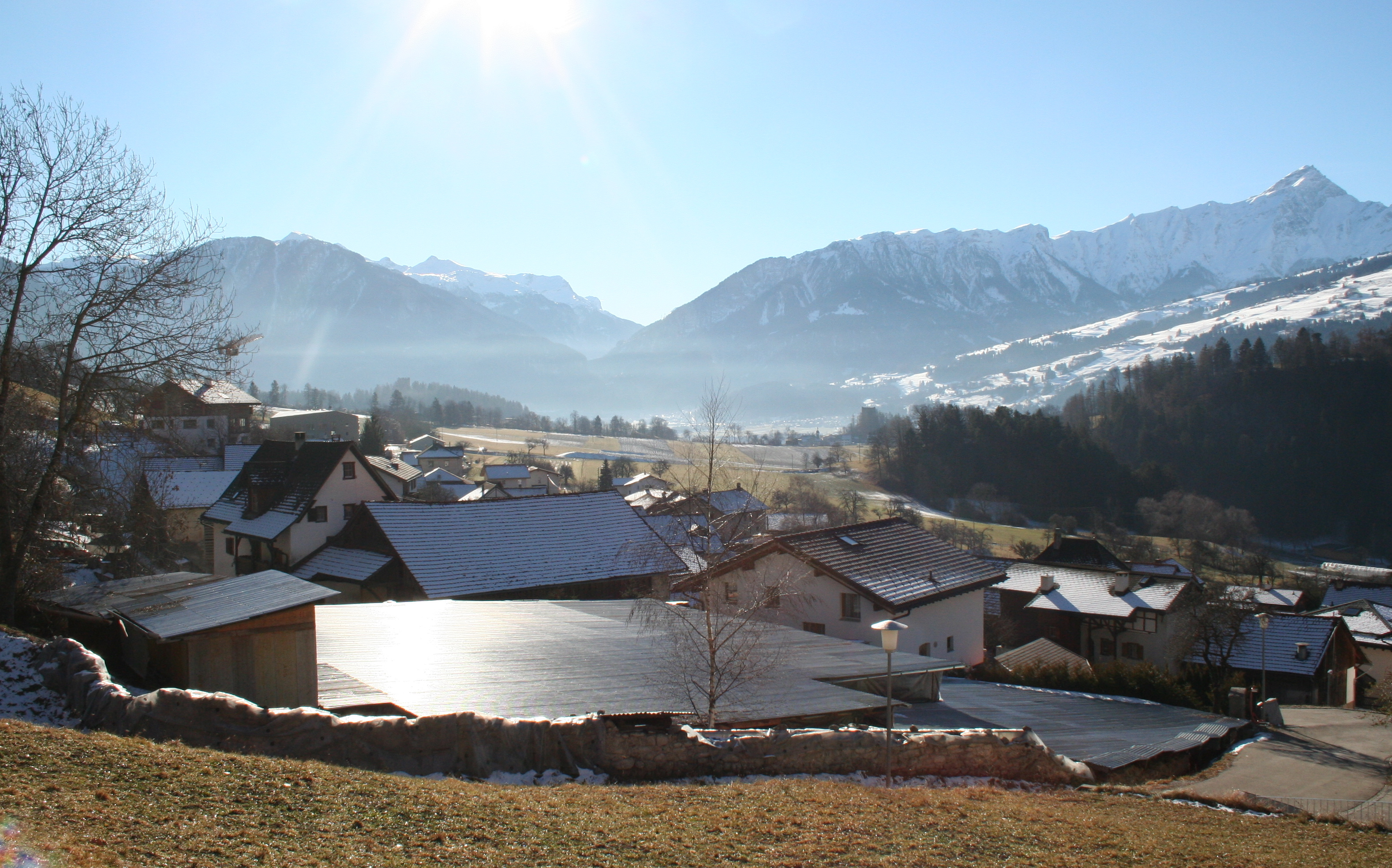
Early medieval church of St. Murezzi
