= Hinterrhein District =

Coordinates: 46°41′N 9°35′E

Hinterrhein District Bezirk Hinterrhein District dal Rain Posteriur
- District
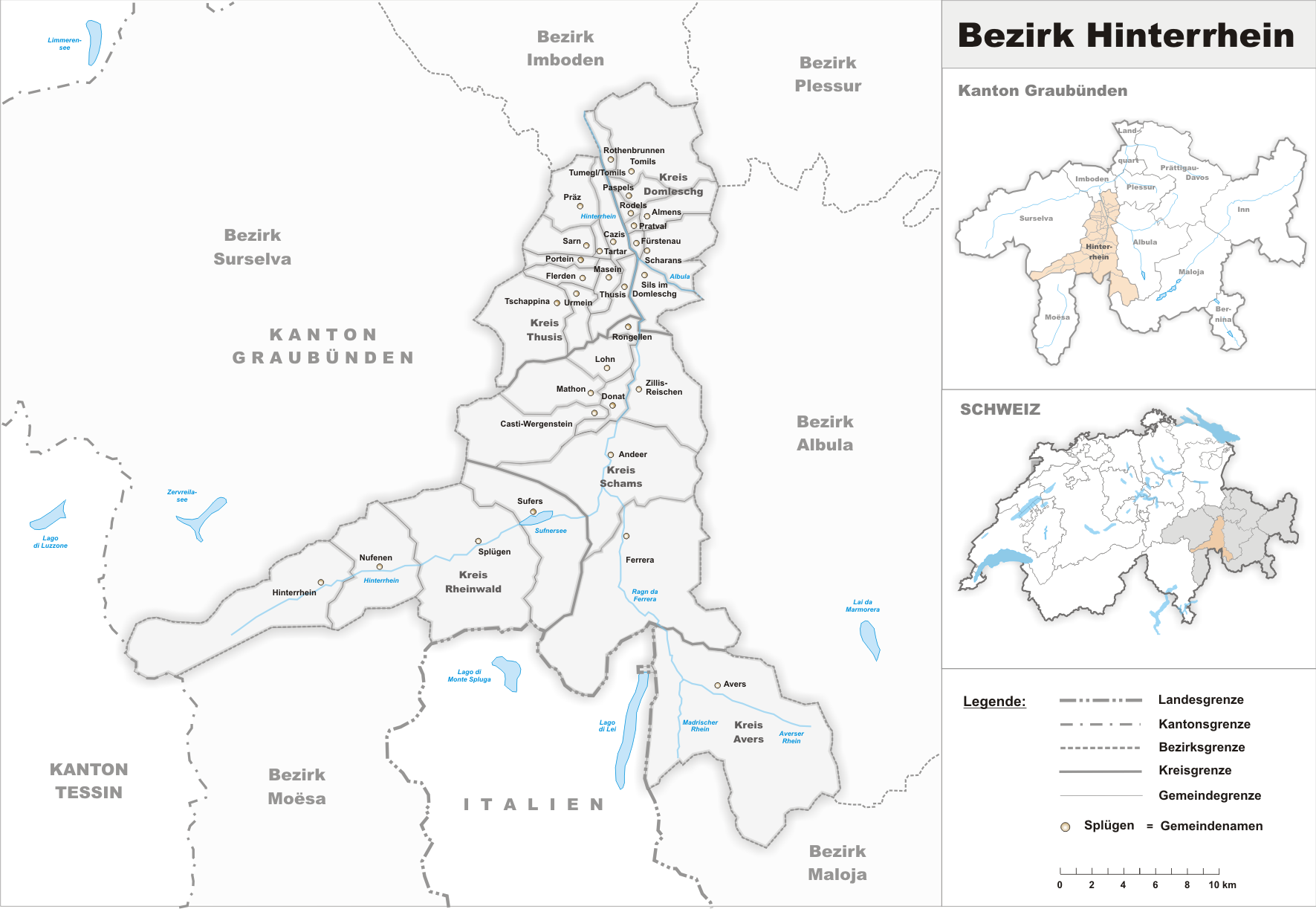
- Country: Switzerland
- Canton: Graubünden
- Capital: Thusis

Area
  - Total: 617.63 km^{2} (238.47 sq mi)

Population (2020)
  - Total: 13,179
  - Density: 21.338/km^{2} (55.265/sq mi)
- Time zone: UTC+1 (CET)
  - Summer (DST): UTC+2 (CEST)
- Municipalities: 24

Hinterrhein District is a former administrative district in the canton of Graubünden, Switzerland. It had an area of 617.67 km^{2} (238.48 sq mi) and had a population of 13,179 in 2015. Much of the district became part of the Viamala Region on 1 January 2017 as part of a reorganization of the Canton.

Hinterrhein District consisted of five Kreise (sub-districts) and twenty-four municipalities. This number decreased from thirty-two when the municipalities of Portein, Präz, Sarn, and Tartar merged on 1 January 2010 into Cazis. It decreased further in 2015 when Almens, Paspels, Pratval, Rodels and Tomils merged to form the new municipality of Domleschg.

Avers sub-district
Municipality	Population (31 December 2020)	Area (km²)
Avers	164	93.07

Domleschg sub-district
Municipality	Population (31 December 2020)	Area (km²)
Domleschg	2,160	45.94
Fürstenau	350	1.30
Rothenbrunnen	304	3.10
Scharans	796	14.28
Sils im Domleschg	971	9.32

Rheinwald sub-district
Municipality	Population (31 December 2020)	Area (km²)
Hinterrhein	61	48.38
Nufenen	139	28.07
Splügen	377	60.53
Sufers	146	34.56

Schams sub-district
Municipality	Population (31 December 2020)	Area (km²)
Andeer	916	30.46
Casti-Wergenstein	56	25.59
Donat	203	4.67
Ferrera	79	75.46
Lohn	51	8.14
Mathon	53	15.12
Rongellen	56	2.04
Zillis-Reischen	389	24.46

Thusis sub-district
Municipality	Population (31 December 2020)	Area (km²)
Cazis	2,287	31.2^{a}
Flerden	247	6.06
Masein	500	4.19
Thusis	9,453	6.84
Tschappina	134	24.67
Urmein	150	4.35

^a Includes the area of Portein, Präz, Sarn and Tartar which merged into Cazis on 1 January 2010.

== Mergers ==
- On 1 January 2003 the municipalities of Donath and Patzen-Fardün became part of Donat.
- On 1 January 2006 Medels im Rheinwald became part of Splügen.
- On 1 January 2009 Tomils was created through the merger of Feldis/Veulden, Scheid, Trans and Tumegl/Tomils.
- On 1 January 2010 Portein, Präz, Sarn and Tartar merged into Cazis.
- On 1 January 2015 Almens, Paspels, Pratval, Rodels and Tomils merged to form Domleschg.

== Languages ==
Languages of Hinterrhein District, GR
Languages	Census 2000	
Languages	Number	Percent
German	10,909	85.5%
Romansh	728	5.7%
Italian	301	2.4%
TOTAL	12,758	100%
