= Ortenstein Castle =

Castle in Switzerland

- Schloss Ortenstein
- Domleschg
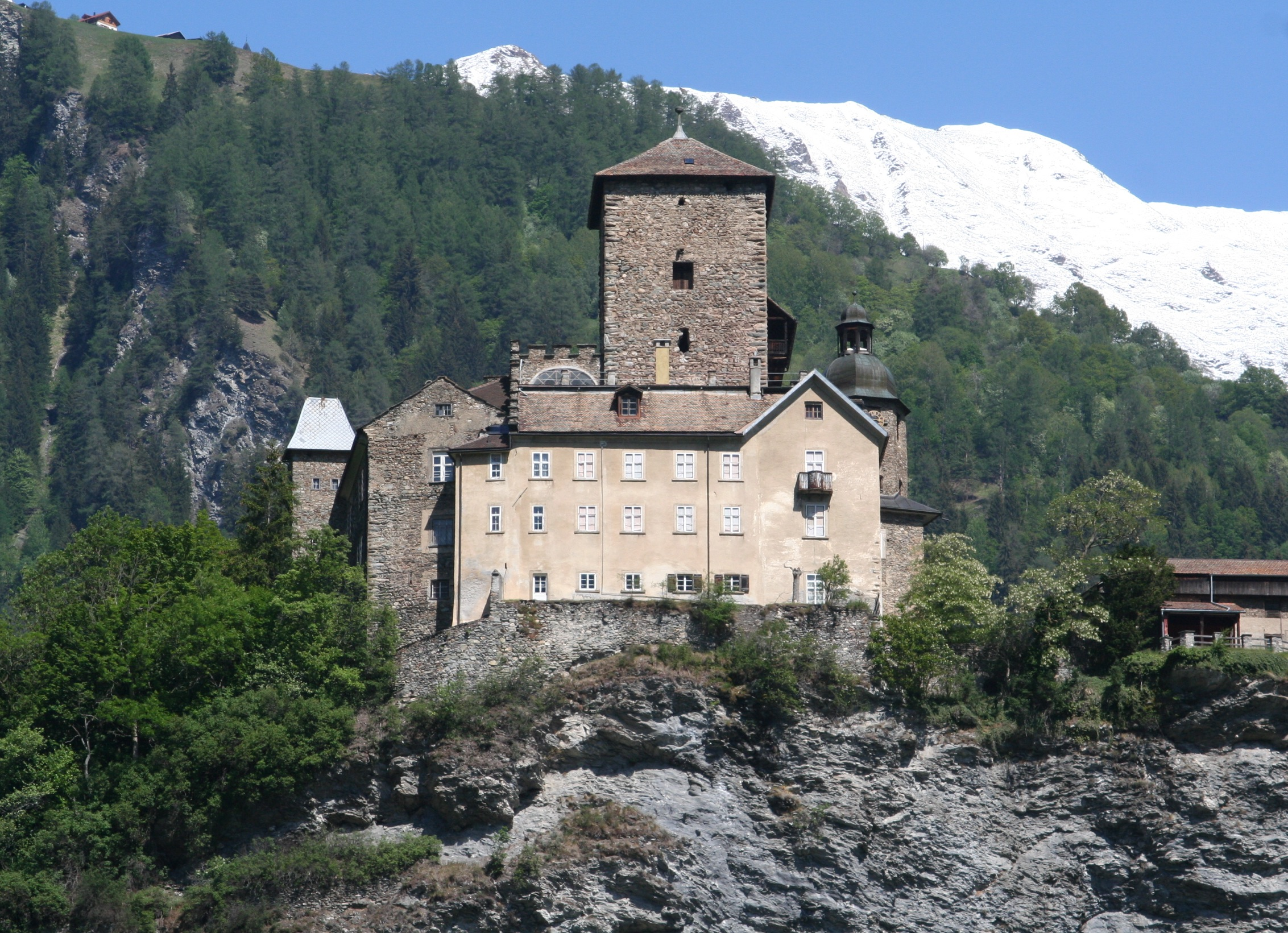
- Ortenstein Castle

Site information
- Type: hill castle
- Code: CH-GR
- Condition: privately owned

Location
- Coordinates: 46°45′35″N 9°26′07″E
- Height: 754 m above the sea

Site history
- Built: about 1250

Ortenstein Castle is a castle in the municipality of Domleschg of the Canton of Graubünden in Switzerland. It is a Swiss heritage site of national significance.

== History ==
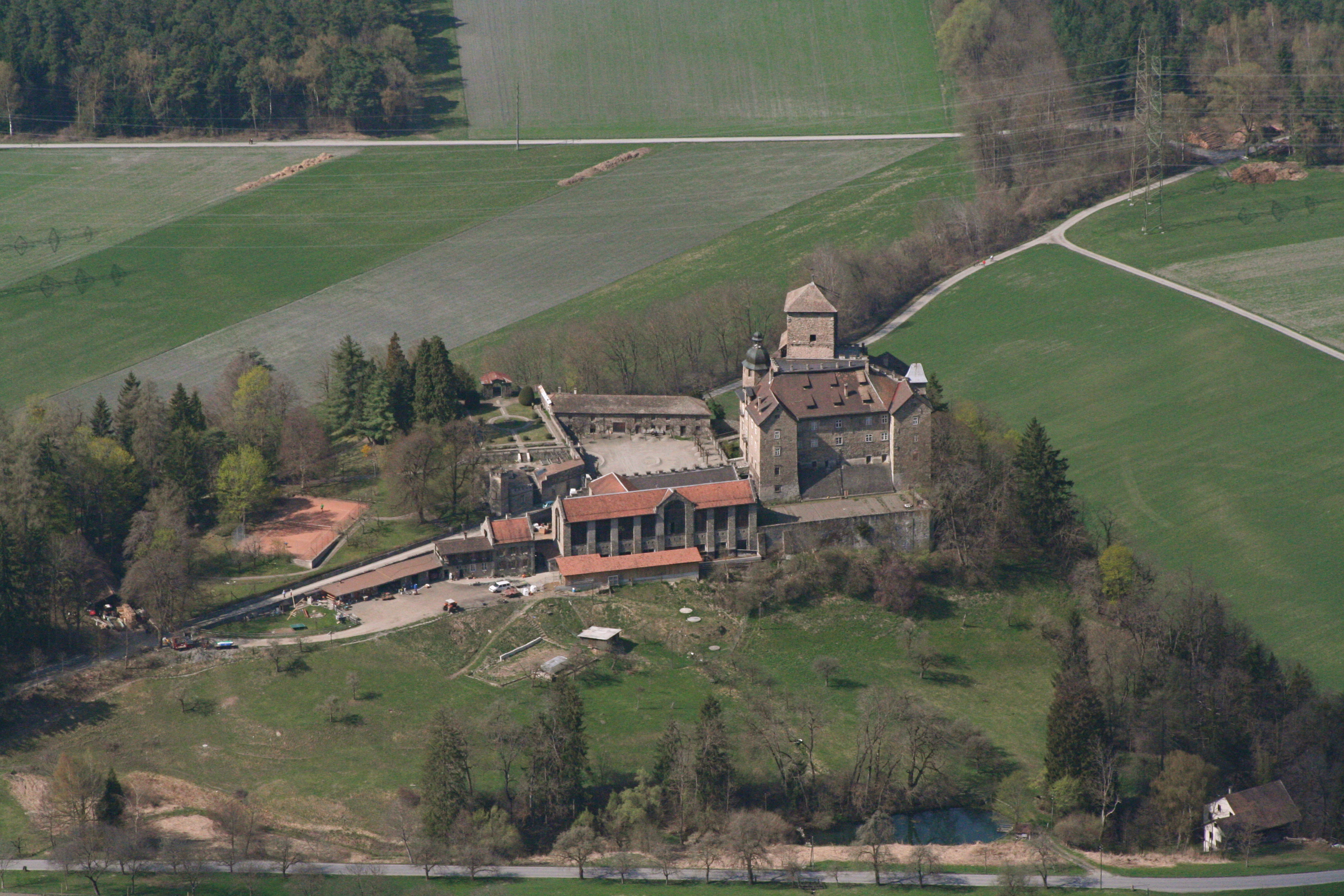
Aerial view of the castle

The castle was built around 1250 on the bishop's land near Tumegl/Tomils. It was built either by the Bishop of Chur or by his representative, the Lords of Vaz. The ecclesiastical farms in Tomils were given as a fief to the Vaz family in 1275. The castle is first mentioned in 1309 as Ortenstain. In 1338 the castle fief was inherited by Ursula von Werdenberg after the extinction of the male heirs of Vaz. By the 14th century the ministerialis (unfree knights in service to a higher noble) family of Ortenstein held the castle for the Werdenberg-Sargans family. In the 15th century a number of nobles lived in Ortenstein. The castle was destroyed in 1451 during a war between the residents of the Schams valley and the Counts of Werdenberg-Sargans.

On 21 July 1452 the Counts and the League of God's House signed a peace treaty. Unlike many of the castles which were damaged during the war and left in ruins, the counts were allowed to rebuild Ortenstein as long as they swore never to use it against the League. The new castle incorporated the main tower from the old, while the rest was new. The main gate was moved from the north-east side to the south and a large gatehouse tower was added. In 1455 the castle was given as collateral to Peter von Griffensee, followed by the Counts of Montfort in 1463 and the town of Glarus in 1471. It remained the property of Count Georg von Werdenberg-Sargans until his death in 1505. After 1505 it passed through a number of hands until 1527 when Ludwig Tschudi sold it and the rulership rights to the village of Tumegl/Tomils.

The following year Victor von Buhlen acquired the castle. The castle then came to the Travers family after Victor's daughter married Jakob Travers. The Travers family was a wealthy patrician family and became one of the most powerful in the Three Leagues. The castle remained in the family for centuries and during the 18th century they rebuilt much of it. In 1846 the family fell into financial trouble and the castle was given to their creditors to settle some of their debts. In 1856 the creditors sold Ortenstein to Father Theodosius Florentini who hoped to turn it into a home for neglected children. The Father was unable to raise enough money and in 1860 sold it for 103,000 Swiss francs to Wolfgang von Juvalta. In 1893 it was inherited by the Tscharner family, who still own it today.

== Castle site ==
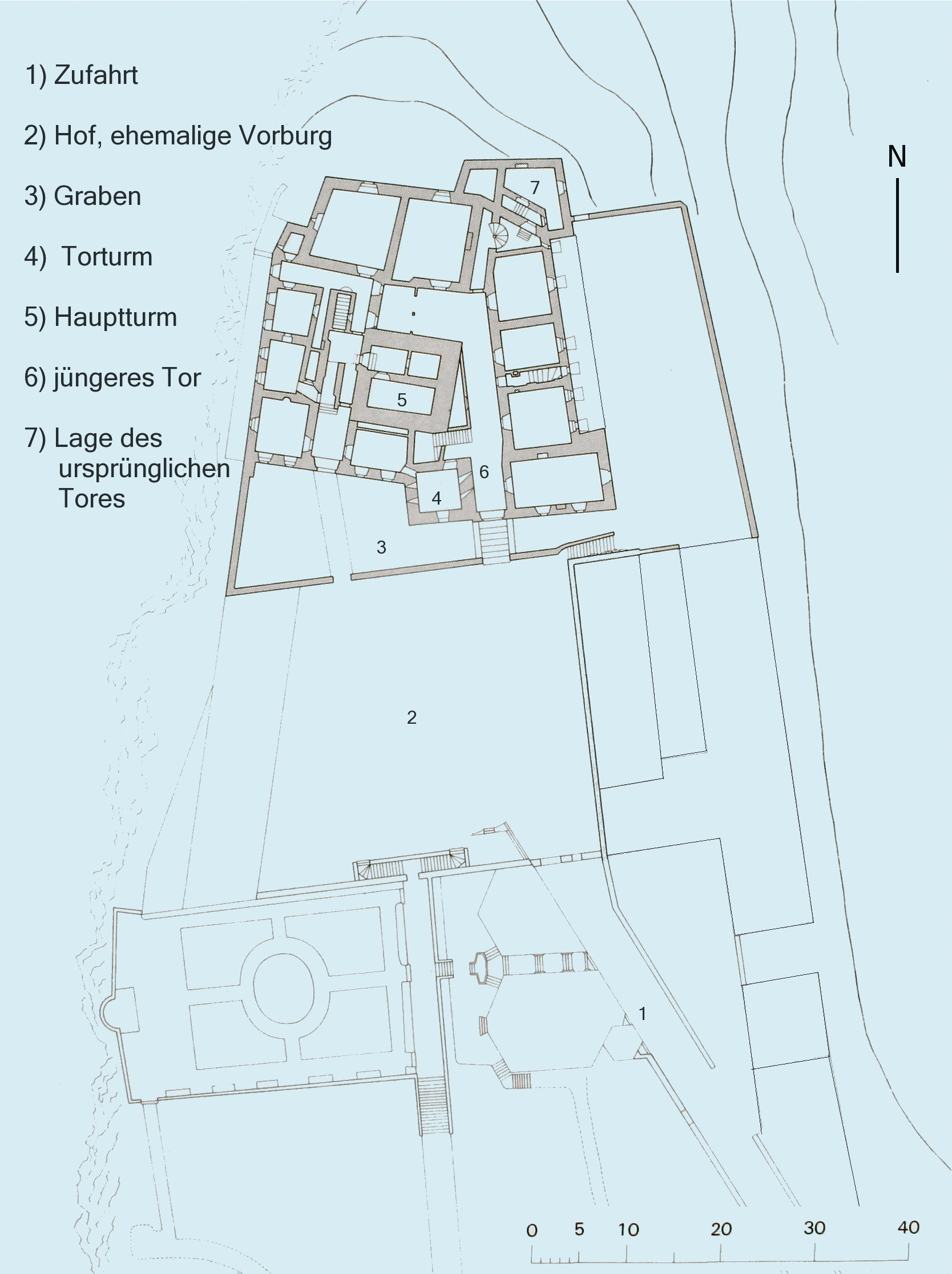
Layout of the castle

The main tower of the castle is a seven-story residence tower that is 11 m × 11 m (36 ft × 36 ft) and has walls that are up to 1.6 m (5.2 ft) thick. From the 15th century reconstruction only the wing north of the tower and the chapel on its third floor retain their original Gothic appearance. Between 1720 and 1740 it was extensively rebuilt. The west wing was extended, the gatehouse raised and a new east wing was added.

== Gallery ==
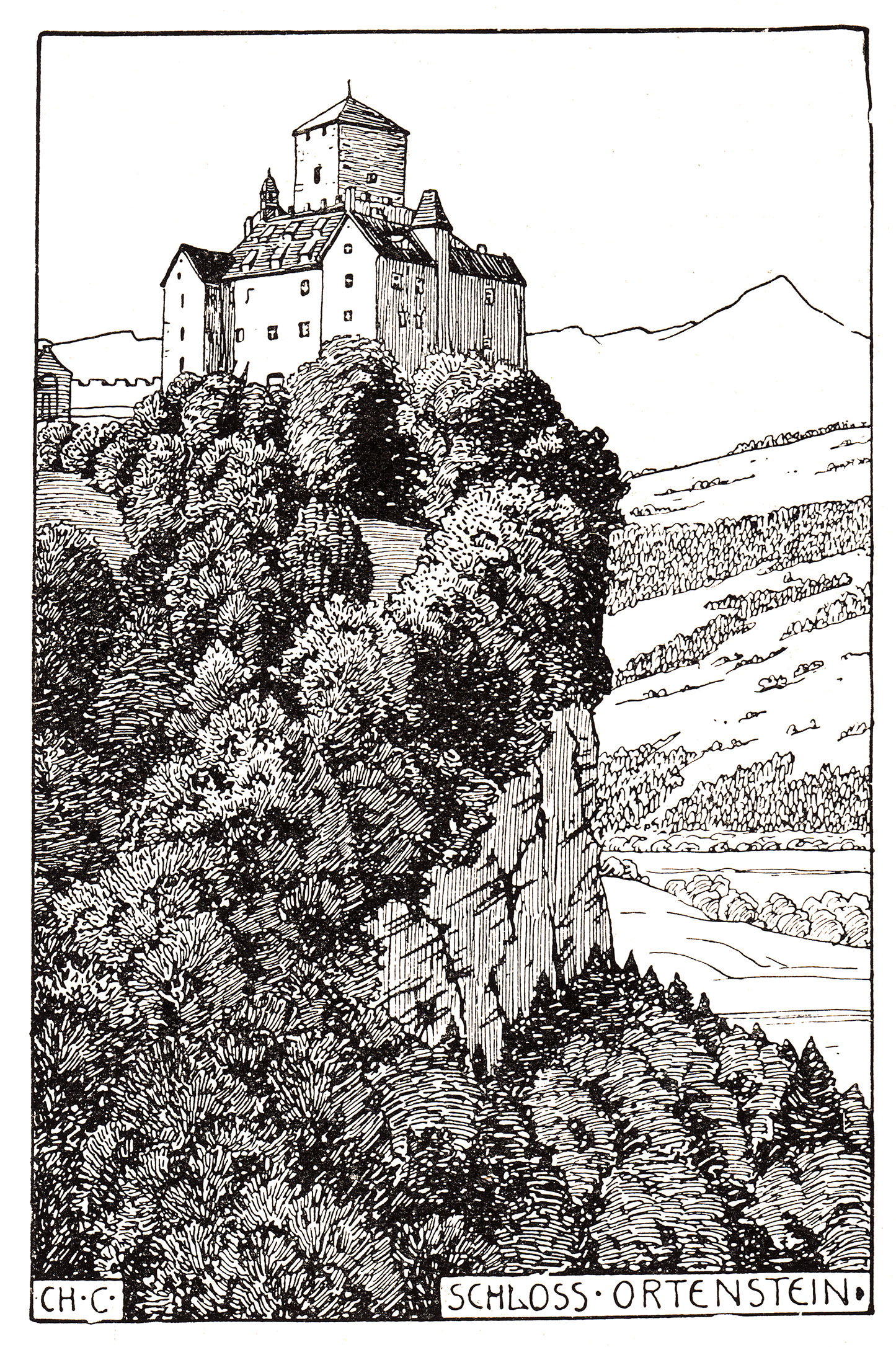
Ortenstein in the early 20th century

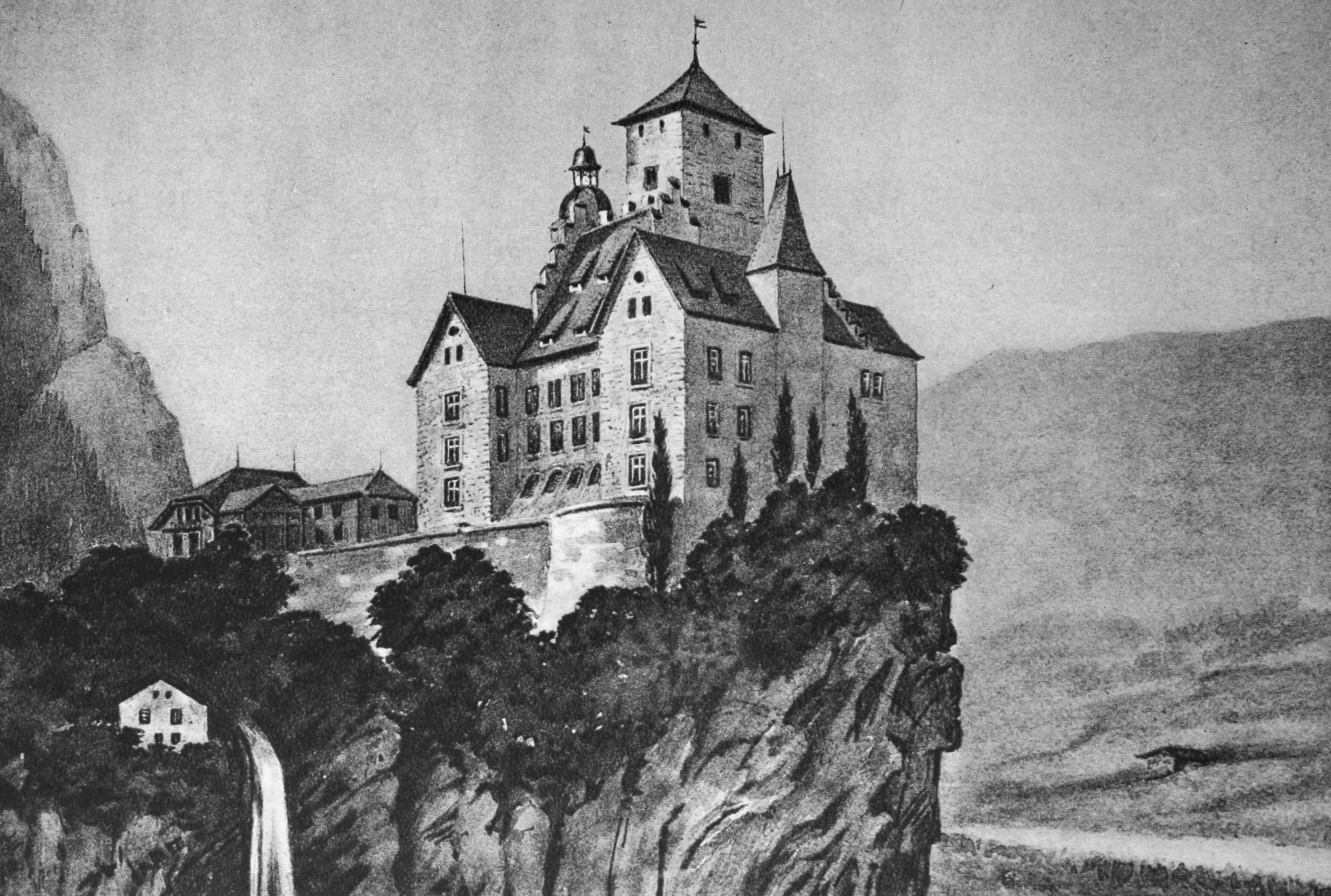
Ortenstein in 1880

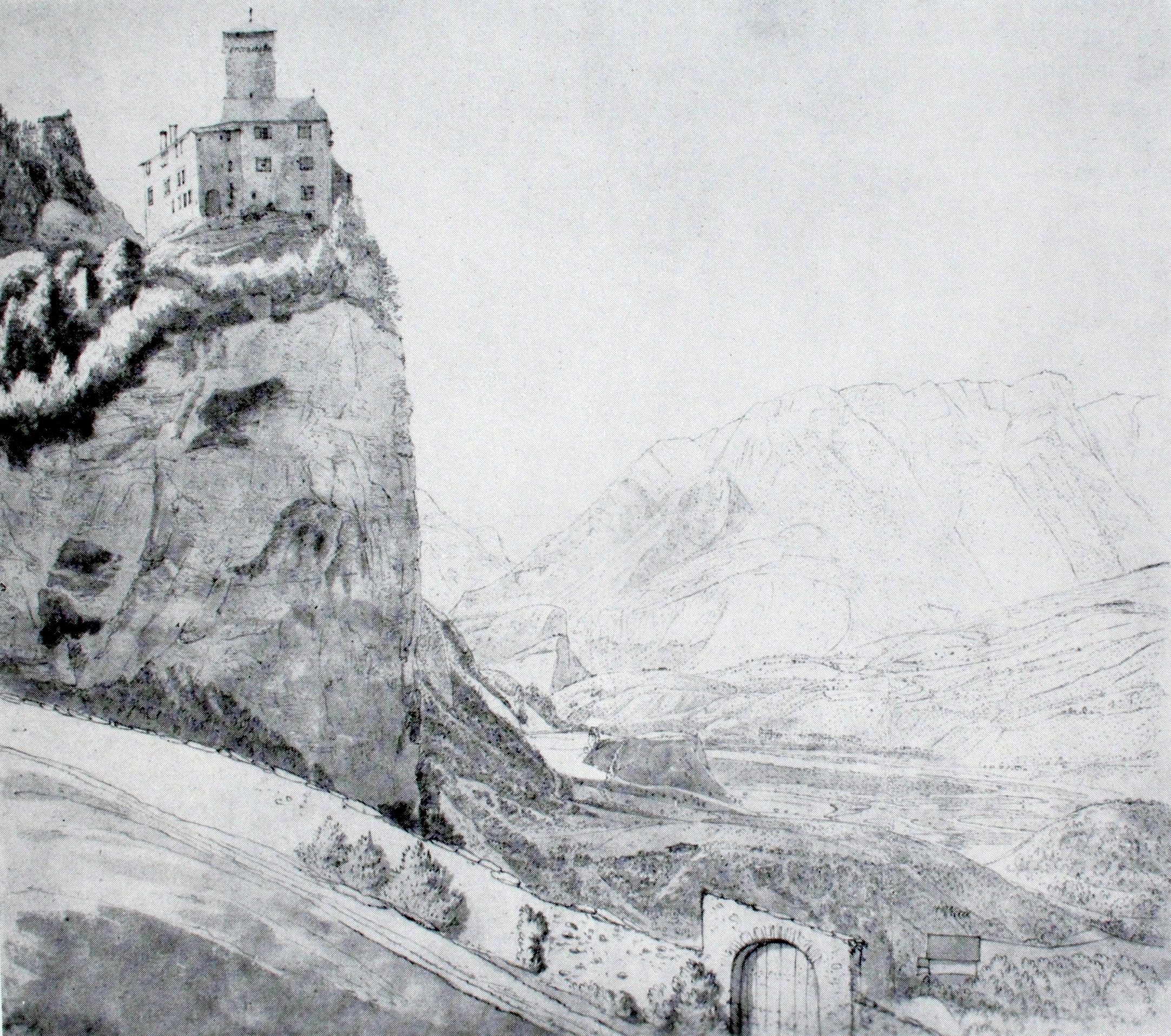
Ortenstein in 1655

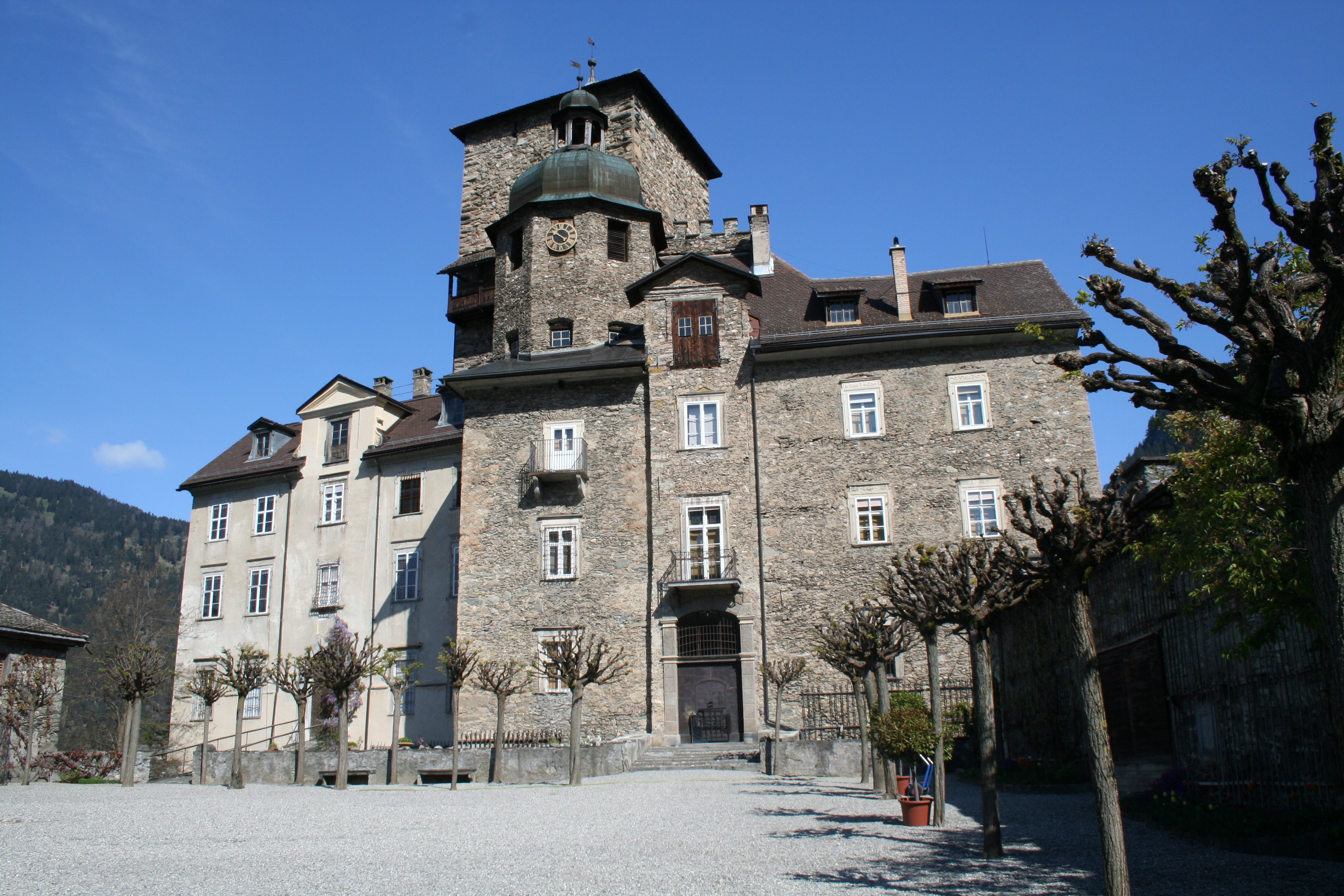
Ortenstein courtyard

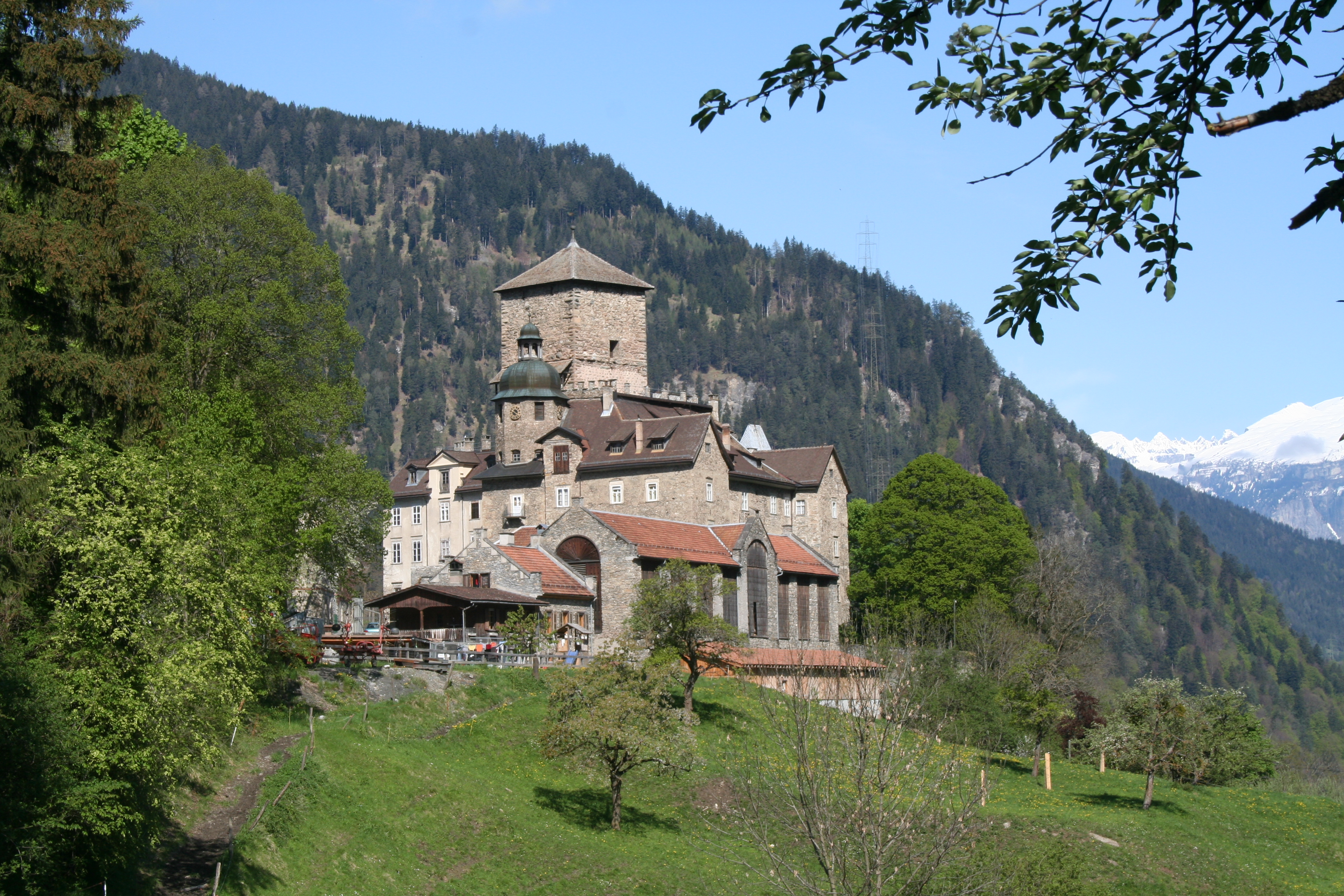
Ortenstein Castle

== See also ==
- List of castles in Switzerland
