= Hinterrhein =

Hinterrhein can refer to:

- Hinterrhein (river), a tributary of the Rhine
- Hinterrhein, Switzerland, a Swiss village and former municipality
- Hinterrhein (district), a former district in Switzwerland including that village
