= Tomils =

- Former municipality
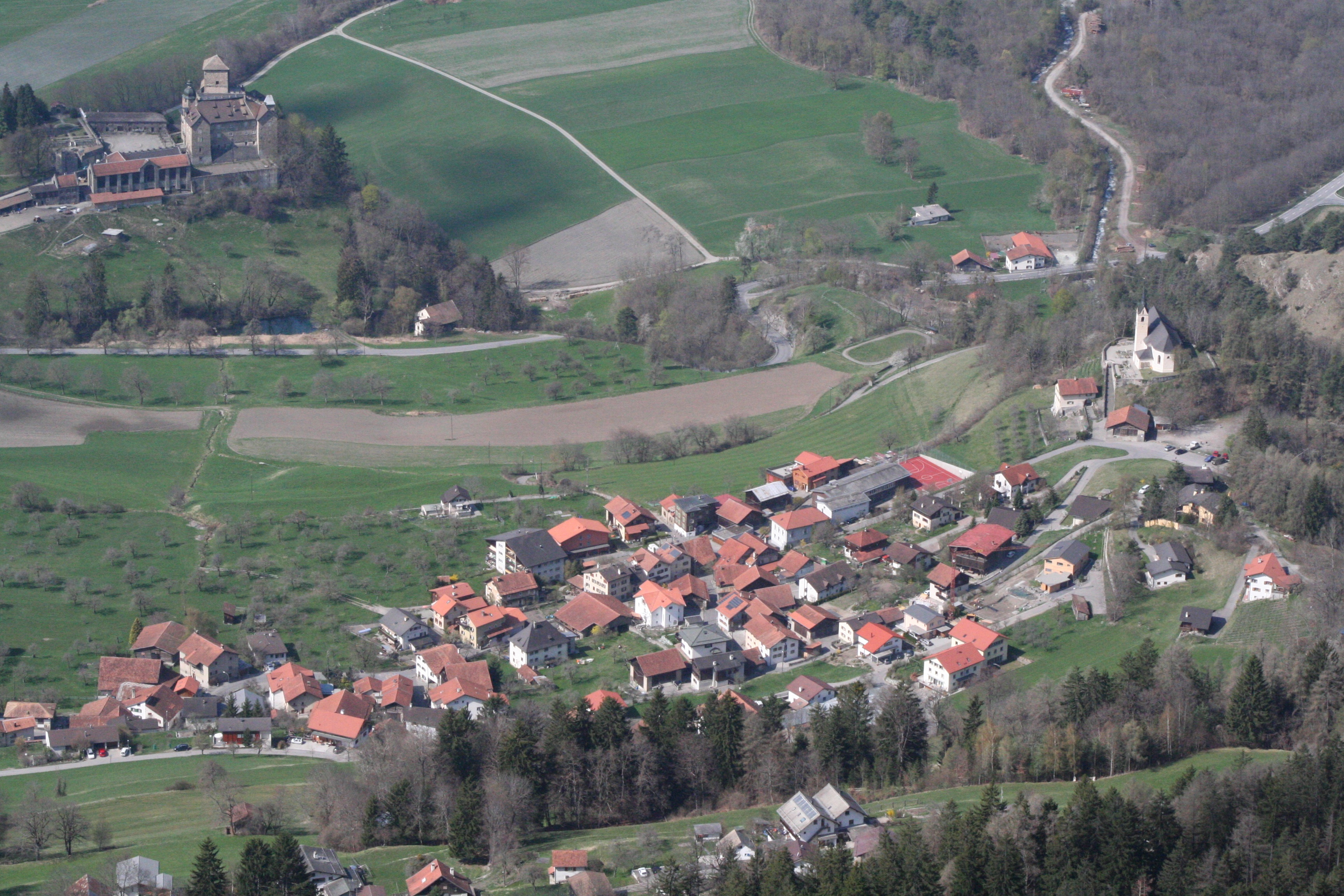

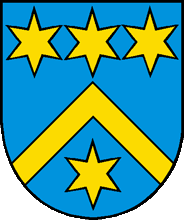
- Coat of arms
- Location of Tomils
- Location within Switzerland Location within Canton of Graubünden
- Coordinates: 46°45′N 9°26′E
- Country: Switzerland
- Canton: Graubünden
- District: Hinterrhein

Area
  - Total: 30.56 km^{2} (11.80 sq mi)
- Elevation: 801 m (2,628 ft)

Population (Dec 2013)
  - Total: 717
  - Density: 23.5/km^{2} (60.8/sq mi)
- Time zone: UTC+01:00 (CET)
  - Summer (DST): UTC+02:00 (CEST)
- Postal code: 7418
- SFOS number: 3671
- ISO 3166 code: CH-GR
- Website: www.domleschg.ch

Tomils is a former municipality in the district of Hinterrhein in the Swiss canton of Graubünden. It was formed on 1 January 2009 through the merger of Feldis/Veulden, Scheid, Trans and Tumegl/Tomils. On 1 January 2015 the former municipalities of Almens, Paspels, Pratval, Rodels and Tomils merged to form the new municipality of Domleschg.

== Demographics ==
Tomils had a population (as of 2013) of 717.

== Dreibündenstein ==
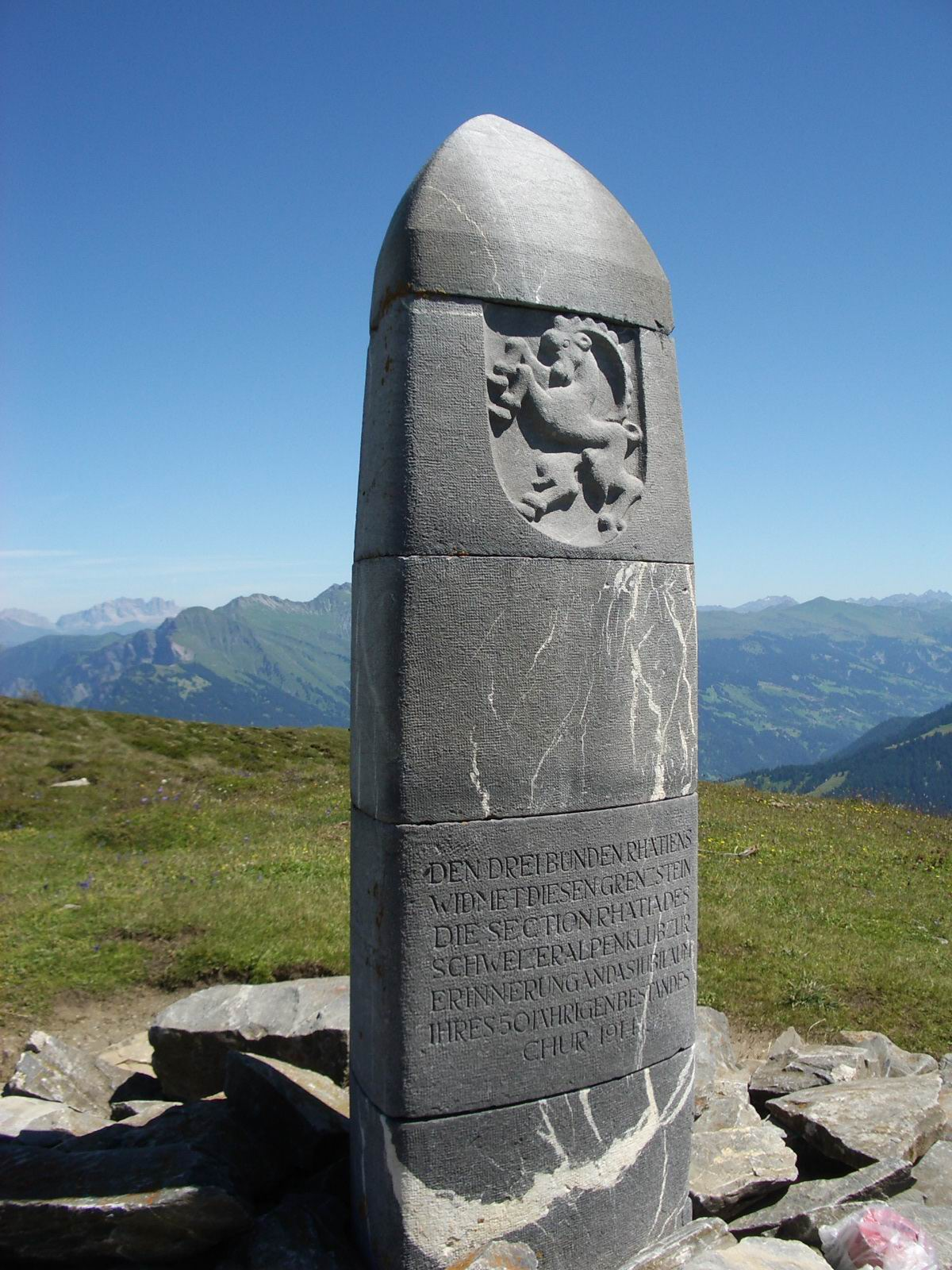
Dreibündenstein, 1915 erected stone to mark the border of the Three Leagues

Aerial view (1947)

The Dreibündenstein (|Romanish: Term bel) is a marker erected at the intersection of the Three Leagues (League of God's House, the League of the Ten Jurisdictions and the Grey League) which would found the modern canton of Graubünden. The stone is at an elevation of 2,160 m (7,090 ft) above sea level, on the border between the municipalities of Domat/Ems, Scheid village (now part of Tomils municipality), and Malix.

The original stone dates from 1722, and today is in the Rätian Museum in Chur. In 1742, Nicolin Sererhard mentions three stones. The Sektion Rhätia (Rhätian Section) of the Swiss Alpine club built this two-metre (6 ft 7 in) stone marker 111 years ago in 1915. A chairlift was added to mountain in 1970, improving access to the marker.
