= Trans, Switzerland =

Trans
- Former municipality
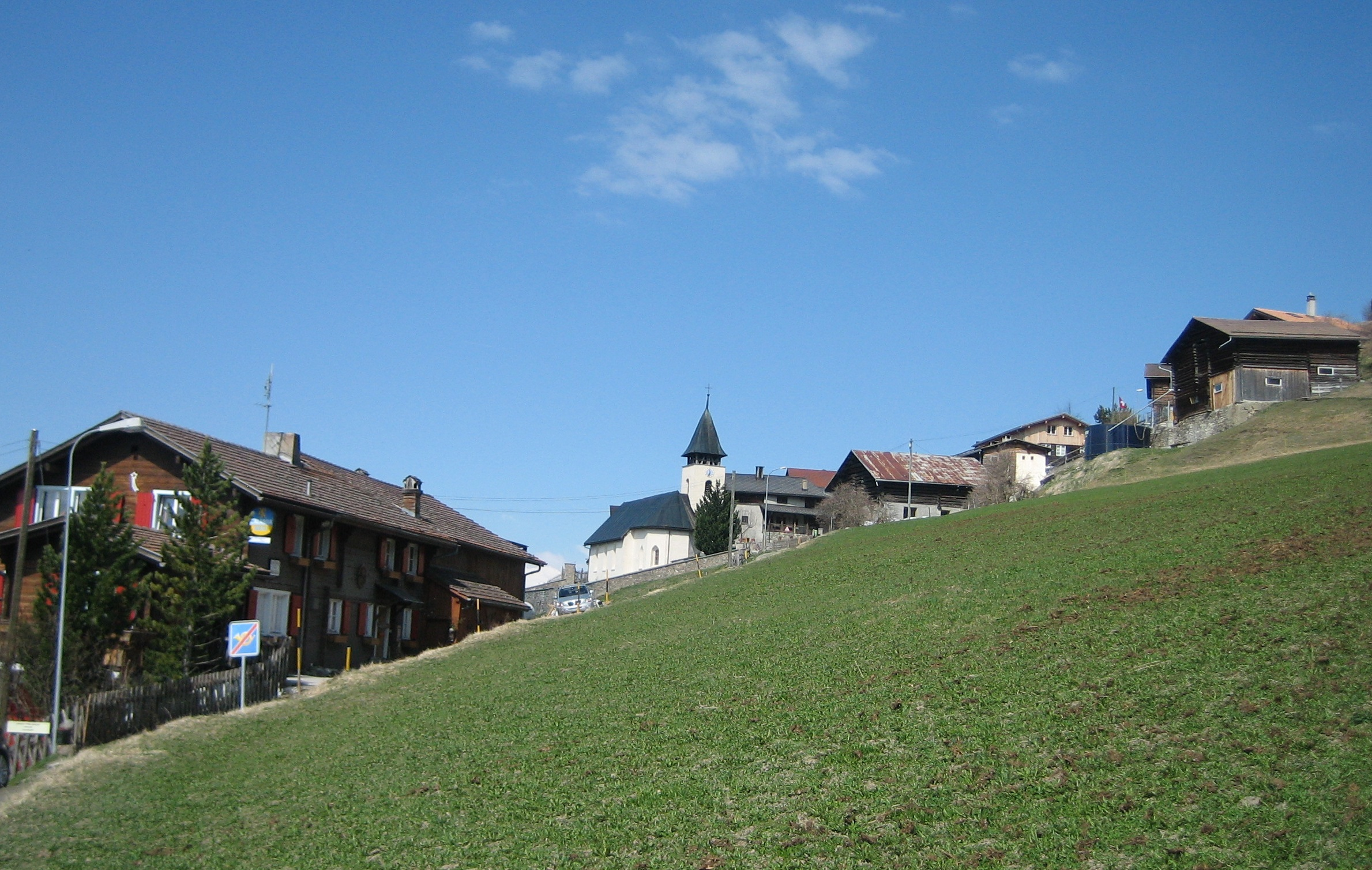

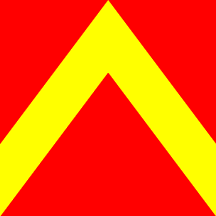
- Flag Coat of arms
- Location of Trans
- Location within Switzerland Location within Canton of Graubünden
- Coordinates: 46°45′N 9°27′E
- Country: Switzerland
- Canton: Graubünden
- District: Hinterrhein

Government
  - Mayor: Ursina Tester

Area
  - Total: 7.44 km^{2} (2.87 sq mi)
- Elevation: 1,473 m (4,833 ft)

Population (December 2007)
  - Total: 56
  - Density: 7.5/km^{2} (19/sq mi)
- Time zone: UTC+01:00 (CET)
  - Summer (DST): UTC+02:00 (CEST)
- Postal code: 7417
- SFOS number: 3641
- ISO 3166 code: CH-GR
- Surrounded by: Almens, Churwalden, Paspels, Scheid, Tumegl/Tomils
- Website: www.trans.ch

Trans is a village in the municipality of Tomils in the district of Hinterrhein in the Swiss canton of Graubünden. In 2009 Trans merged with Feldis/Veulden, Scheid and Tumegl/Tomils to form the municipality of Tomils.

== History ==
Trans is first mentioned in the middle of the 12th Century as Hof ad Tranne.

== Geography ==
Trans has an area, as of 2006, of 7.4 km^{2} (2.9 sq mi). Of this area, 30.2% is used for agricultural purposes, while 46.4% is forested. Of the rest of the land, 1.3% is settled (buildings or roads) and the remainder (22%) is non-productive (rivers, glaciers or mountains).

The municipality is located in the Domleschg sub-district, of the Hinterrhein district. It consisted of the haufendorf (an irregular, unplanned and quite closely packed village, built around a central square) village of Trans, located on a terrace 1,473 m (4,833 ft) above the eastern side of the Hinterrhine valley.

== Demographics ==
Trans has a population (as of 2007) of 56, all Swiss. Over the last 10 years the population has decreased at a rate of -17.6%.

As of 2000, the gender distribution of the population was 55.4% male and 44.6% female. The age distribution, as of 2000, in Trans is; 8 people or 11.6% of the population are between 0 and 9 years old. 6 people or 8.7% are 10 to 14, and 4 people or 5.8% are 15 to 19. Of the adult population, 5 people or 7.2% of the population are between 20 and 29 years old. 7 people or 10.1% are 30 to 39, 11 people or 15.9% are 40 to 49, and 12 people or 17.4% are 50 to 59. The senior population distribution is 5 people or 7.2% of the population are between 60 and 69 years old, 4 people or 5.8% are 70 to 79, there are 7 people or 10.1% who are 80 to 89.

In the 2007 federal election the most popular party was the SVP which received 66.9% of the vote. The next three most popular parties were the SPS (17.9%), the FDP (9%) and the CVP (4.8%).

The entire Swiss population is generally well educated. In Trans about 52.8% of the population (between age 25-64) have completed either non-mandatory upper secondary education or additional higher education (either University or a Fachhochschule).

Trans has an unemployment rate of 0%. As of 2005, there were 15 people employed in the primary economic sector and about 7 businesses involved in this sector. 4 people are employed in the secondary sector and there are 2 businesses in this sector. 4 people are employed in the tertiary sector, with 2 businesses in this sector.

The historical population is given in the following table:

year	population
1803	84
1850	104
1900	56
1950	61
2000	69
