= Tumegl/Tomils =

- Former municipality
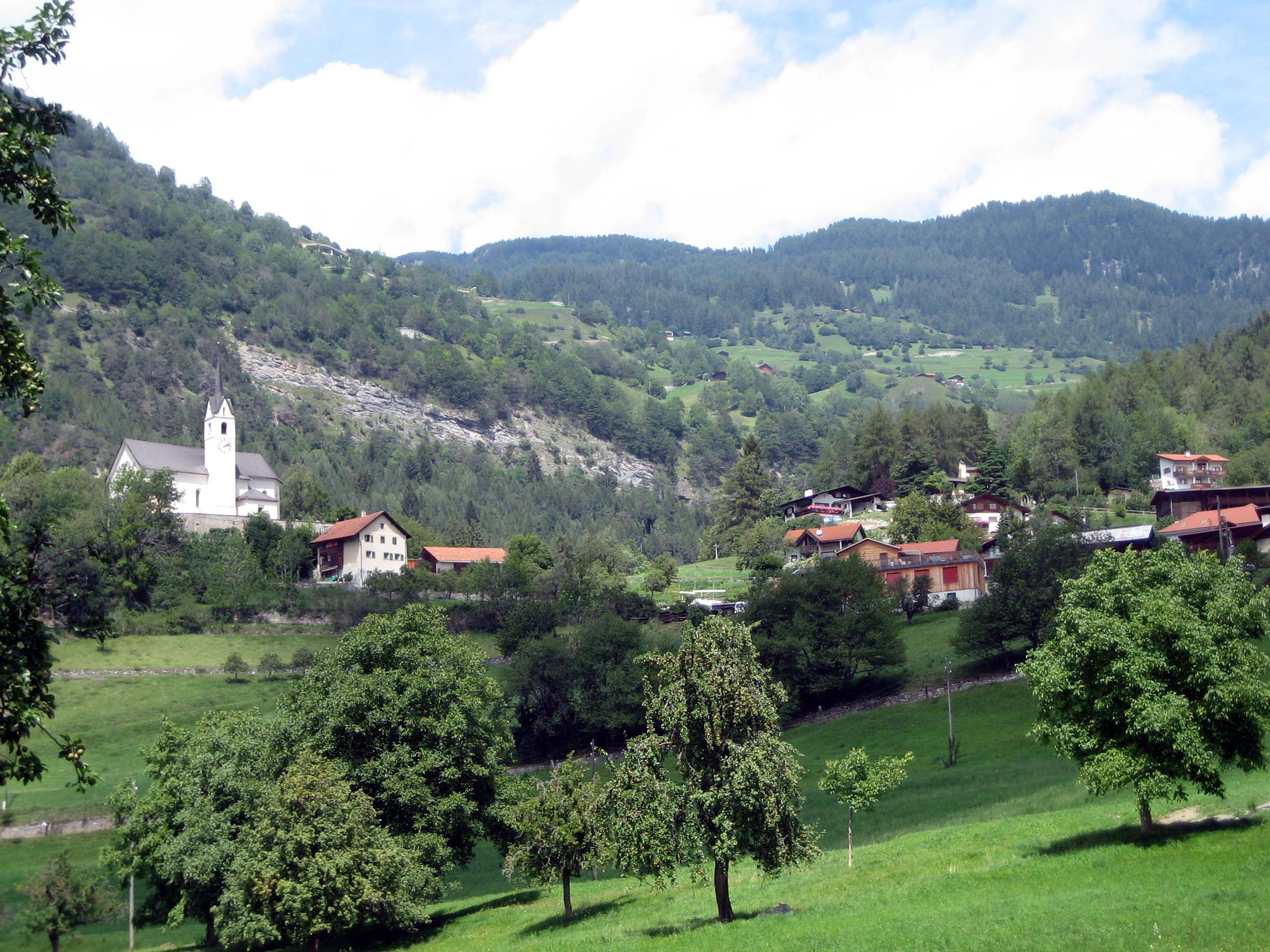

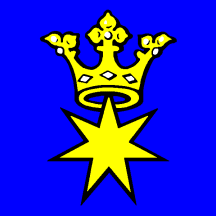
- Flag Coat of arms
- Location of Tumegl/Tomils
- Location within Switzerland Location within Canton of Graubünden
- Coordinates: 46°45′N 9°26′E
- Country: Switzerland
- Canton: Graubünden
- District: Hinterrhein

Area
  - Total: 3.21 km^{2} (1.24 sq mi)
- Elevation: 801 m (2,628 ft)

Population (December 2007)
  - Total: 365
  - Density: 114/km^{2} (295/sq mi)
- Time zone: UTC+01:00 (CET)
  - Summer (DST): UTC+02:00 (CEST)
- Postal code: 7418
- SFOS number: 3642
- ISO 3166 code: CH-GR
- Surrounded by: Cazis, Paspels, Rothenbrunnen, Scheid, Trans
- Website: www.tumegl-tomils.ch

Tumegl/Tomils is a village in the municipality of Tomils in the district of Hinterrhein in the Swiss canton of Graubünden. In 2009, Tumegl/Tomils merged with Feldis/Veulden, Scheid and Trans to form the new municipality of Tomils.

== History ==
Tumegl/Tomils is first mentioned in 1141 as in Tumillis.

== Geography ==
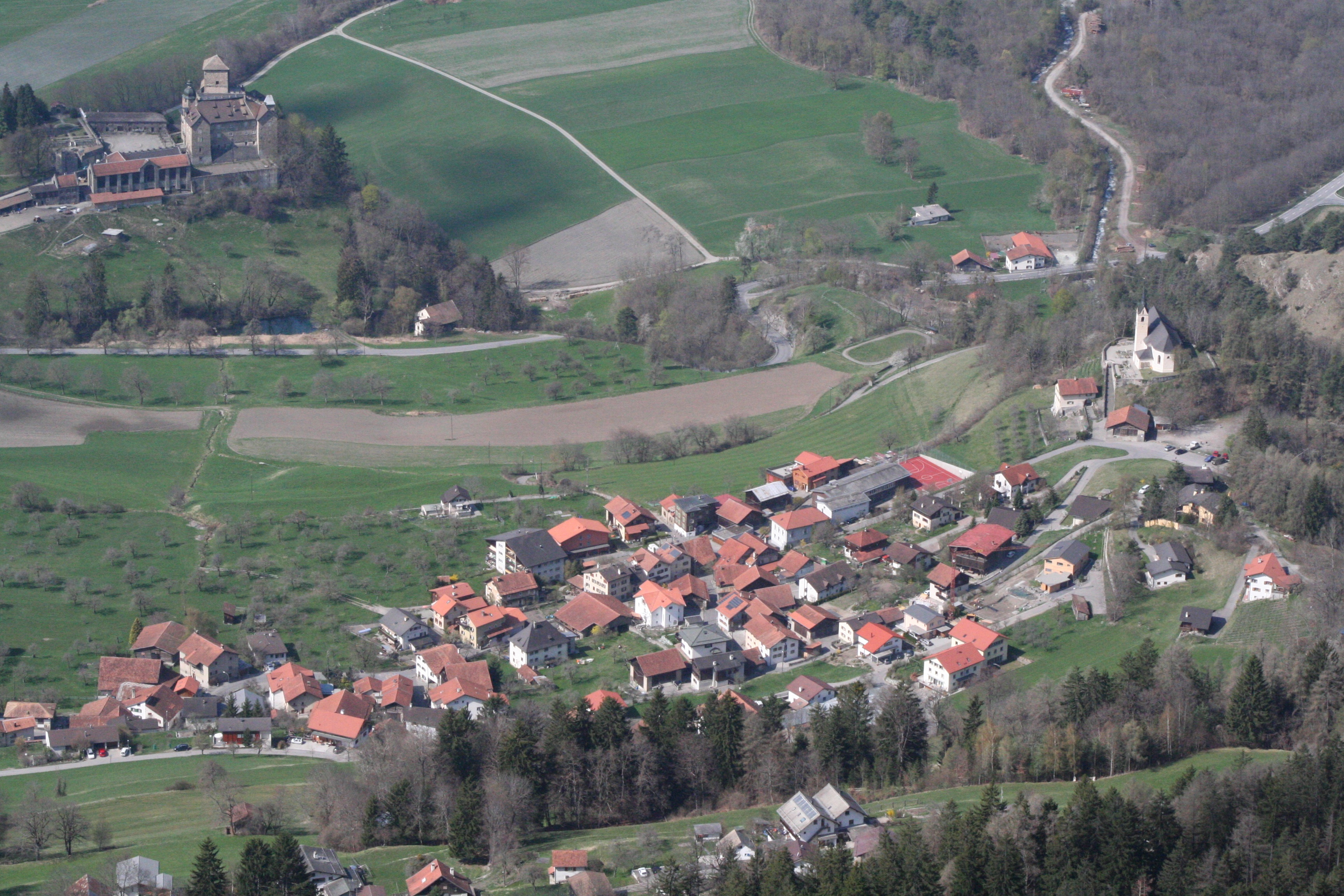
Village of Tomils

Tumegl/Tomils had an area, as of 2006, of 3.2 km^{2} (1.2 sq mi). Of this area, 34% was used for agricultural purposes, while 55.8% was forested. Of the rest of the land, 5.3% was settled (buildings or roads) and the remainder (5%) was non-productive (rivers, glaciers or mountains).

The village is located in the Domleschg sub-district, of the Hinterrhein district. It is located on a low terrace on the right bank of the Hinterrhine. In 2009 Tumegl/Tomils merged with Feldis/Veulden, Scheid and Trans to form the municipality of Tomils. Until 1943, Tumegl/Tomils was known simply as Tomils.

== Demographics ==
Tumegl/Tomils had a population (as of 2007) of 365, of which 5.2% were foreign nationals. Over the previous 10 years, the population had grown by 7.7%.

As of 2000, the gender distribution of the population was 51.5% male and 48.5% female. The age distribution, as of 2000, in Tumegl/Tomils was; 48 people or 15.0% of the population were between 0 and 9 years old. 31 people or 9.7% were 10 to 14, and 26 people or 8.1% were 15 to 19. Of the adult population, 24 people or 7.5% of the population were between 20 and 29 years old. 55 people or 17.1% were 30 to 39, 52 people or 16.2% were 40 to 49, and 22 people or 6.9% were 50 to 59. The senior population distribution was 17 people or 5.3% of the population were between 60 and 69 years old, 28 people or 8.7% were 70 to 79, there were 12 people or 3.7% who were 80 to 89, there were 5 people or 1.6% who were 90 to 99, and 1 person or 0.3% who was 100 or more.

In the 2007 federal election, the most popular party was the SPS which received 36.8% of the vote. The next three most popular parties were the SVP (28%), the CVP (21.1%) and the FDP (13.4%).

The entire Swiss population is generally well educated. In Tumegl/Tomils about 86.6% of the population (between age 25-64) had completed either non-mandatory upper secondary education or additional higher education (either University or a Fachhochschule).

Tumegl/Tomils had an unemployment rate of 0.87%. As of 2005, there were 12 people employed in the primary economic sector and about five businesses involved in this sector. 14 people were employed in the secondary sector and there were three businesses in this sector. 18 people were employed in the tertiary sector, with eight businesses in this sector.

The historical population is given in the following table:

year	population
1803	202
1850	226
1900	233
1950	266
2000	321

== Languages ==
Most of the population (as of 2000) spoke German (91.3%), with Romansh being second most common ( 4.0%) and Albanian being third ( 2.2%).

Languages in Tumegl/Tomils
Languages	Census 1980		Census 1990		Census 2000	
Languages	Number	Percent	Number	Percent	Number	Percent
German	169	77.88%	228	87.69%	293	91.28%
Romanish	35	16.13%	17	6.54%	13	4.05%

== Heritage sites of national significance ==
The S. Maria e Maurezzi Church, Burg Ortenstein (Ortenstein castle) and Sogn Murezi (an early medieval church) are listed as Swiss heritage sites of national significance.

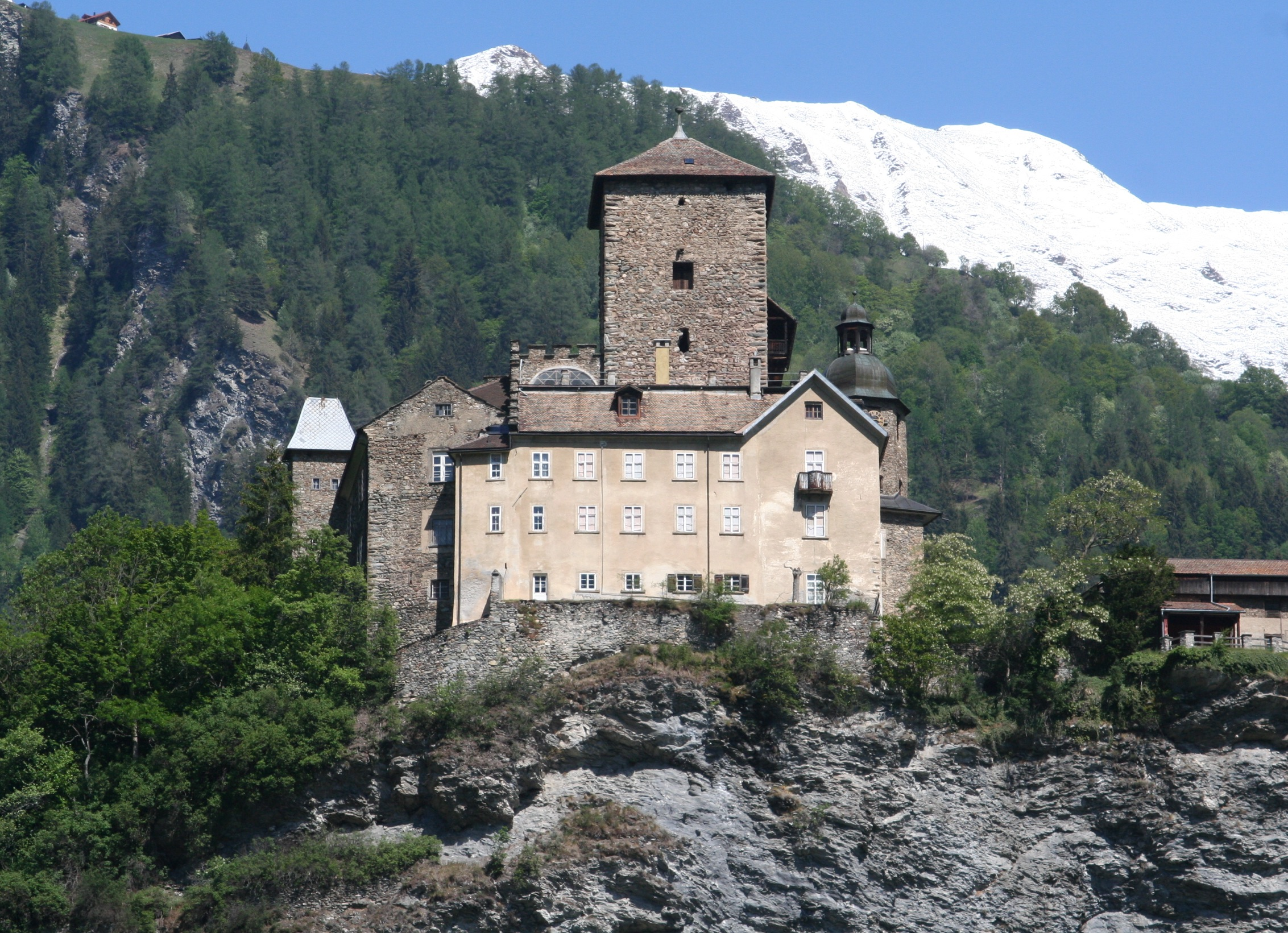
Burg Ortenstein

Aerial view (1947)
