= Scheid =

- Former municipality
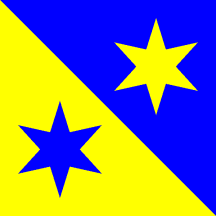
- Flag Coat of arms
- Location of Scheid
- Location within Switzerland Location within Canton of Graubünden
- Coordinates: 46°46′N 9°26′E
- Country: Switzerland
- Canton: Graubünden
- District: Hinterrhein

Area
  - Total: 12.32 km^{2} (4.76 sq mi)
- Elevation: 1,221 m (4,006 ft)

Population (December 2007)
  - Total: 148
  - Density: 12.0/km^{2} (31.1/sq mi)
- Time zone: UTC+01:00 (CET)
  - Summer (DST): UTC+02:00 (CEST)
- Postal code: 7419
- ISO 3166 code: CH-GR
- Surrounded by: Churwalden, Domat/Ems, Feldis/Veulden, Malix, Rothenbrunnen, Trans, Tumegl/Tomils
- Website: www.scheid.ch

Scheid (Swiss Standard German pronunciation: [ʃaɪd]) is a village in the municipality of Tomils in the district of Hinterrhein in the Swiss canton of Graubünden. In 2009 Scheid merged with Feldis/Veulden, Trans and Tumegl/Tomils to form the municipality of Tomils.

== History ==
Scheid is first mentioned in the 12th century as de Side.

== Geography ==
Scheid has an area, as of 2006, of 12.3 km^{2} (4.7 sq mi). Of this area, 43.3% is used for agricultural purposes, while 42% is forested. Of the rest of the land, 2.1% is settled (buildings or roads) and the remainder (12.6%) is non-productive (rivers, glaciers or mountains). The village is located in the Domleschg sub-district, of the Hinterrhein district. It consisted of two settlements, Unterscheid and Oberscheid, on the right bank of the Hinterrhein. In 2009 Scheid merged with Feldis/Veulden, Trans and Tumegl/Tomils to form Tomils.

In Romansh the two sections are known as Sched (Unterscheid) and Purz (Oberscheid).

== Demographics ==
Scheid has a population (as of 2007) of 148, of which 2.7% are foreign nationals. Over the last 10 years the population has grown at a rate of 8.8%.

As of 2000, the gender distribution of the population was 50.6% male and 49.4% female. The age distribution, as of 2000, in Scheid is; 99 people or 13.3% of the population are between 0 and 9 years old. 59 people or 7.9% are 10 to 14, and 34 people or 4.6% are 15 to 19. Of the adult population, 78 people or 10.5% of the population are between 20 and 29 years old. 164 people or 22.1% are 30 to 39, 138 people or 18.6% are 40 to 49, and 69 people or 9.3% are 50 to 59. The senior population distribution is 48 people or 6.5% of the population are between 60 and 69 years old, 38 people or 5.1% are 70 to 79, there are 13 people or 1.7% who are 80 to 89, and there are 3 people or 0.4% who are 90 to 99.

In the 2007 federal election the most popular party was the SVP which received 70.6% of the vote. The next three most popular parties were the SPS (15.2%), the FDP (9.3%) and the CVP (4.8%).

The entire Swiss population is generally well educated. In Scheid about 69.4% of the population (between age 25 and 64) have completed either non-mandatory upper secondary education or additional higher education (either University or a Fachhochschule).

Scheid has an unemployment rate of 0%. As of 2005, there were 36 people employed in the primary economic sector and about 16 businesses involved in this sector. 4 people are employed in the secondary sector and there are 2 businesses in this sector. 1 person is employed in the tertiary sector, with 1 business in this sector.

The historical population is given in the following table:

year	population
1803	219
1850	222
1900	156
1950	154
1960	136
1970	104
1980	116
1990	115
2000	139

== Languages ==
Most of the population (as of 2000) speaks German (79.1%), with Romansh being second most common (19.4%) and Portuguese being third ( 0.7%).

Languages in Scheid
Languages	Census 1980		Census 1990		Census 2000	
Languages	Number	Percent	Number	Percent	Number	Percent
German	44	37.93%	72	62.61%	110	79.14%
Romanish	69	59.48%	42	36.52%	27	19.42%

== Dreibündenstein ==
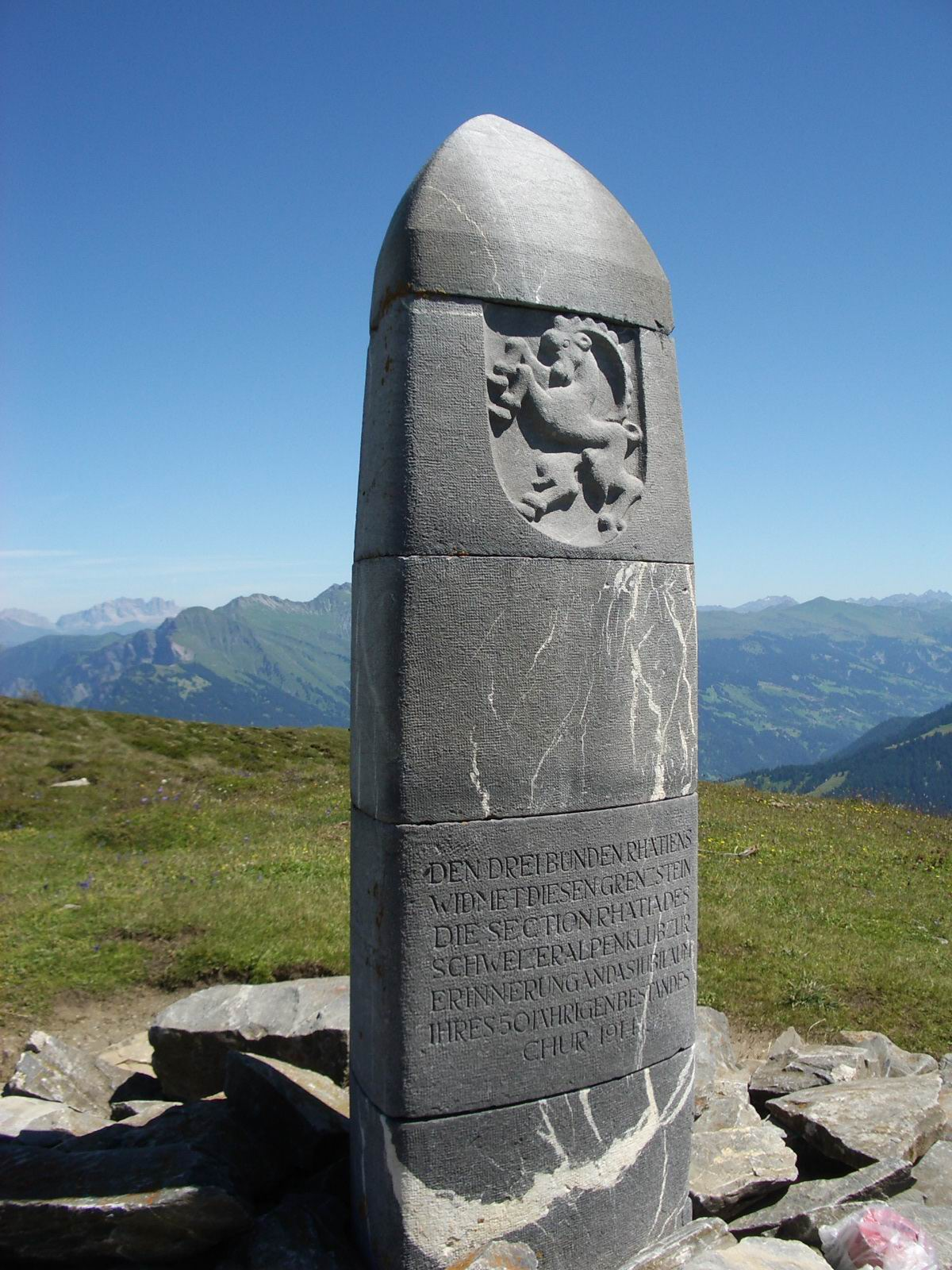
Dreibündenstein, 1915 erected stone to mark the border of the Three Leagues

The Dreibündenstein (|Romanish: Term bel) is a marker erected at the intersection of the Three Leagues (League of God's House, the League of the Ten Jurisdictions and the Grey League) which would found the modern canton of Graubünden. The stone is at an altitude of 2,160 m (7,090 ft) on the border between the municipalities of Domat/Ems, Scheid village (now part of Tomils municipality) and Malix. The original stone dates from 1722, and today is in the Rätian Museum in Chur. In 1742, Nicolin Sererhard mentions three stones. The Sektion Rhätia (Rhätian Section) of the Swiss Alpine club built this 2-metre (6 ft 7 in) tall stone marker in 1915. In 1970 a chair lift was added to mountain, making it easier to reach the marker.
