= Rothenbrunnen =

- Municipality
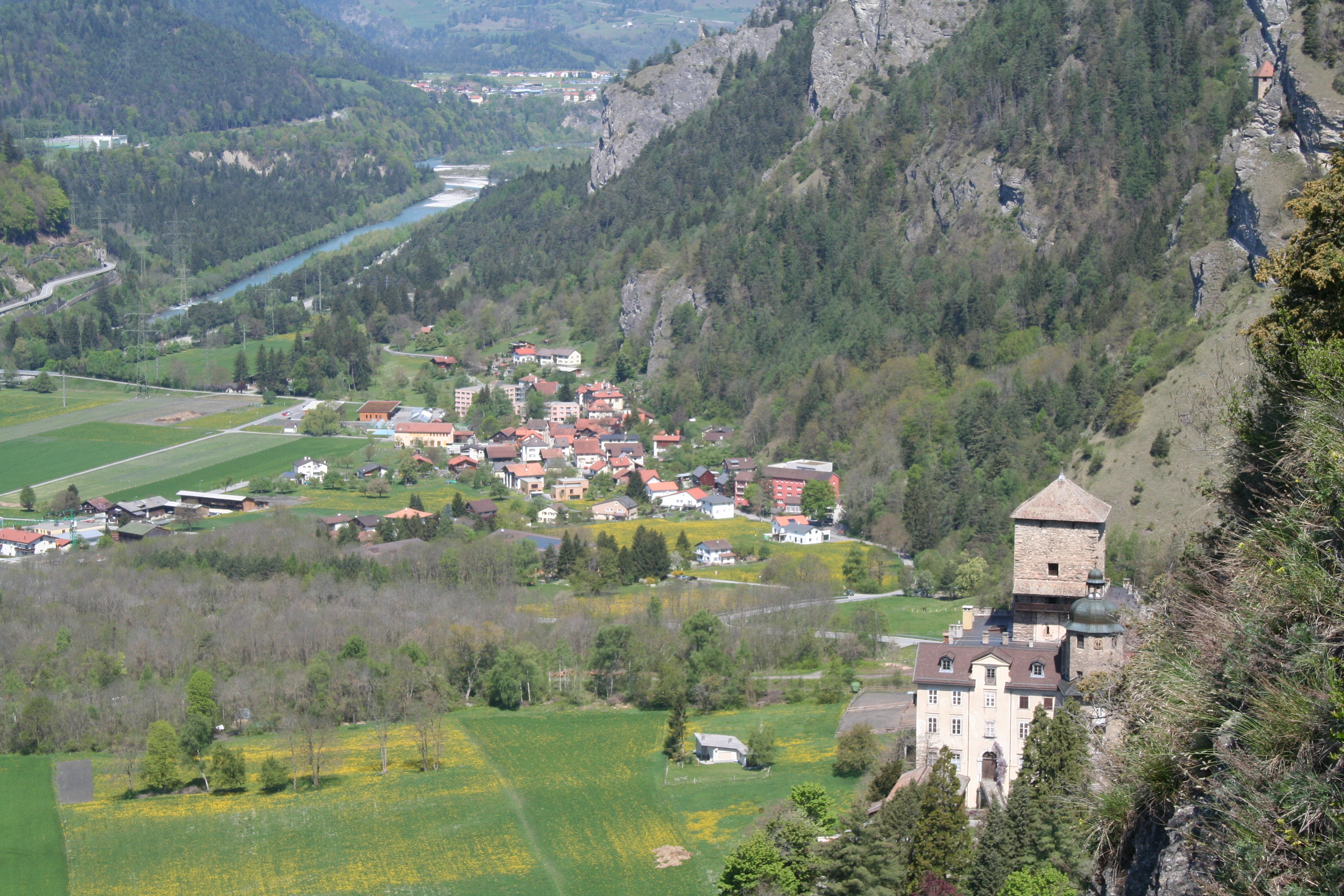

- Flag Coat of arms
- Location of Rothenbrunnen
- Location within Switzerland Location within Canton of Grisons
- Coordinates: 46°46′N 9°25′E
- Country: Switzerland
- Canton: Grisons
- District: Viamala

Area
  - Total: 3.11 km^{2} (1.20 sq mi)
- Elevation: 625 m (2,051 ft)

Population (December 2020)
  - Total: 304
  - Density: 97.7/km^{2} (253/sq mi)
- Time zone: UTC+01:00 (CET)
  - Summer (DST): UTC+02:00 (CEST)
- Postal code: 7405
- SFOS number: 3637
- ISO 3166 code: CH-GR
- Surrounded by: Cazis, Domat/Ems, Feldis/Veulden, Rhäzüns, Scheid, Tumegl/Tomils
- Website: www.rothenbrunnen.ch

Rothenbrunnen (Romansh: Giuvaulta) is a municipality in the Viamala Region in the Swiss canton of the Grisons.

== History ==
Rothenbrunnen is first mentioned in 1472 as Hof Juvalt. In 1572 it was mentioned as zum Roten Brunnen.

== Geography ==
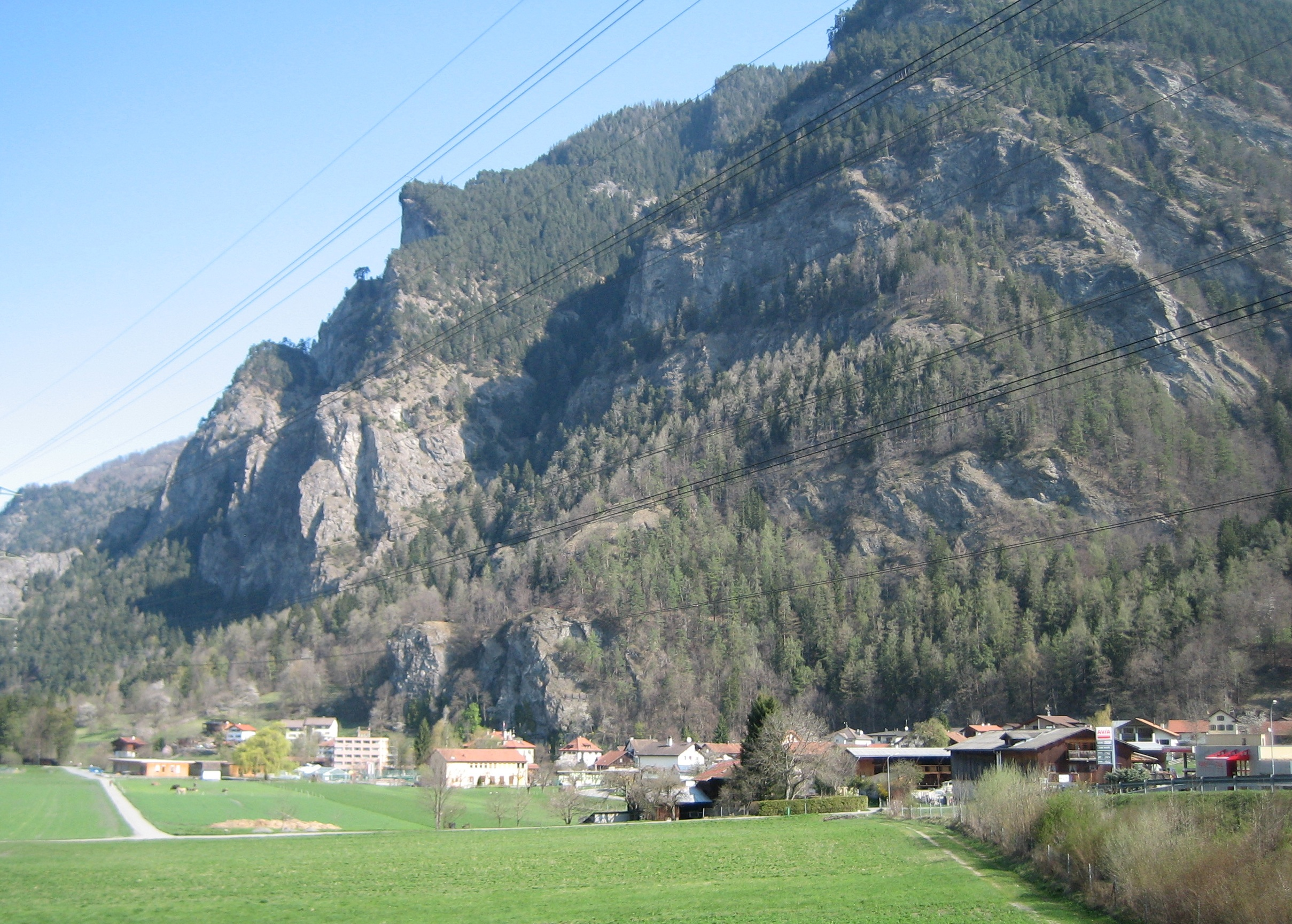
Rothenbrunnen village

Rothenbrunnen has an area, as of 2006, of 3.1 km^{2} (1.2 sq mi). Of this area, 11.6% is used for agricultural purposes, while 67.7% is forested. Of the rest of the land, 9.4% is settled (buildings or roads) and the remainder (11.3%) is non-productive (rivers, glaciers or mountains).

Before 2017, the municipality was located in the Domleschg sub-district, of the Hinterrhein district, after 2017 it was part of the Viamala Region. It is a linear village on the right hand side of the Hinterrhine river. It also includes the settlement of Ravetsch (Romansh: Ravetg).

== Coat of arms ==
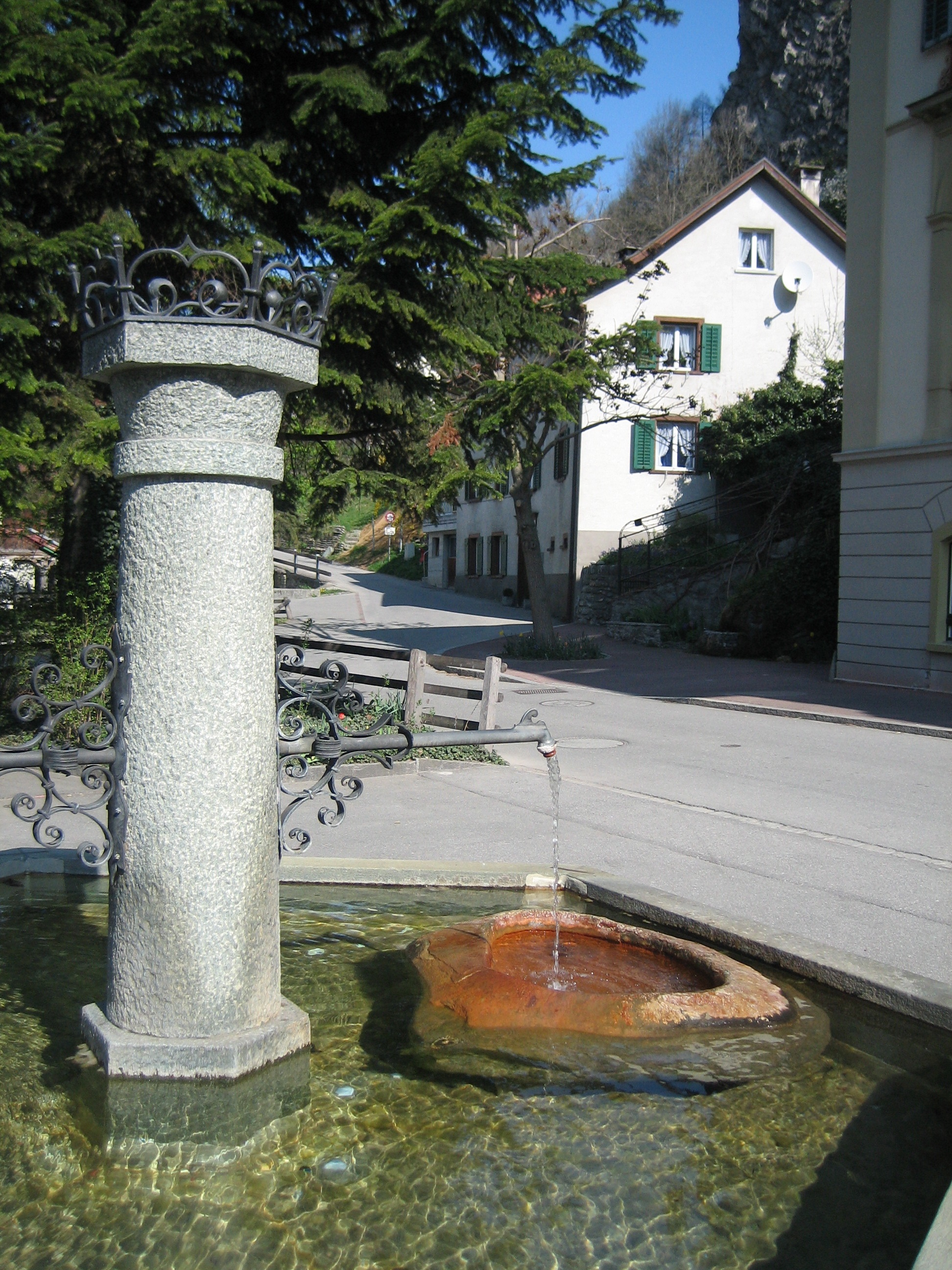
Rothenbrunnen fountain

The municipality's coat of arms is Argent a Fountain proper Gules and in Chief Azure a Mullet Or. This is an example of canting where the name of the municipality is translated or represented on the coat of arms. In this case, in German Rothen means red and brunnen means fountain. The fountain refers to the source of medicinal waters for which the municipality was known.

The coat of arms is also the coat of arms of the Friie von Juvalta, but modified with a star. The coat of arms of the friie was: D'azur à l'étoile de cinq / six pointes d'argent / or. Later, the coat of arms was augmentend to taillé, d'azur à l'étoile de cinq / six pointes d'argent / or et d'or à l'aiglon de gueules. All these variants or brisure where chosen to distinguish the older from the younger brother(s).

== Demographics ==
Rothenbrunnen has a population (as of 31 December 2020) of 304. As of 2008, 11.2% of the population was made up of foreign nationals. Over the last 10 years the population has decreased at a rate of -6.5%.

As of 2000, the gender distribution of the population was 47.5% male and 52.5% female. The age distribution, as of 2000, in Rothenbrunnen is; 58 people or 13.7% of the population are between 0 and 9 years old. 28 people or 6.6% are 10 to 14, and 39 people or 9.2% are 15 to 19. Of the adult population, 38 people or 9.0% of the population are between 20 and 29 years old. 70 people or 16.6% are 30 to 39, 67 people or 15.9% are 40 to 49, and 68 people or 16.1% are 50 to 59. The senior population distribution is 31 people or 7.3% of the population are between 60 and 69 years old, 11 people or 2.6% are 70 to 79, there are 8 people or 1.9% who are 80 to 89, and there are 4 people or 0.9% who are 90 to 99.

In the 2007 federal election the most popular party was the SVP which received 44.6% of the vote. The next three most popular parties were the SPS (22.4%), the FDP (15%) and the CVP (10.5%).

In Rothenbrunnen about 58.1% of the population (between age 25-64) have completed either non-mandatory upper secondary education or additional higher education (either university or a Fachhochschule).

Rothenbrunnen has an unemployment rate of 1.29%. As of 2005, there were 11 people employed in the primary economic sector and about 4 businesses involved in this sector. 31 people are employed in the secondary sector and there are 5 businesses in this sector. 230 people are employed in the tertiary sector, with 13 businesses in this sector.

The historical population is given in the following table:

year	population
1803	64
1900	77
1950	247
1960	292
1970	319
1980	403
1990	330
2000	422

== Languages ==
Most of the population (as of 2000) speaks German (83.2%), with Romansh being second most common ( 7.6%) and Portuguese being third ( 2.1%).

Languages in Rothenbrunnen
Languages	Census 1980		Census 1990		Census 2000	
Languages	Number	Percent	Number	Percent	Number	Percent
German	265	65.76%	254	76.97%	351	83.18%
Romanish	44	10.92%	32	9.70%	32	7.58%
Italian	69	17.12%	11	3.33%	7	1.66%
Population	403	100%	330	100%	422	100%

== Heritage sites of national significance ==
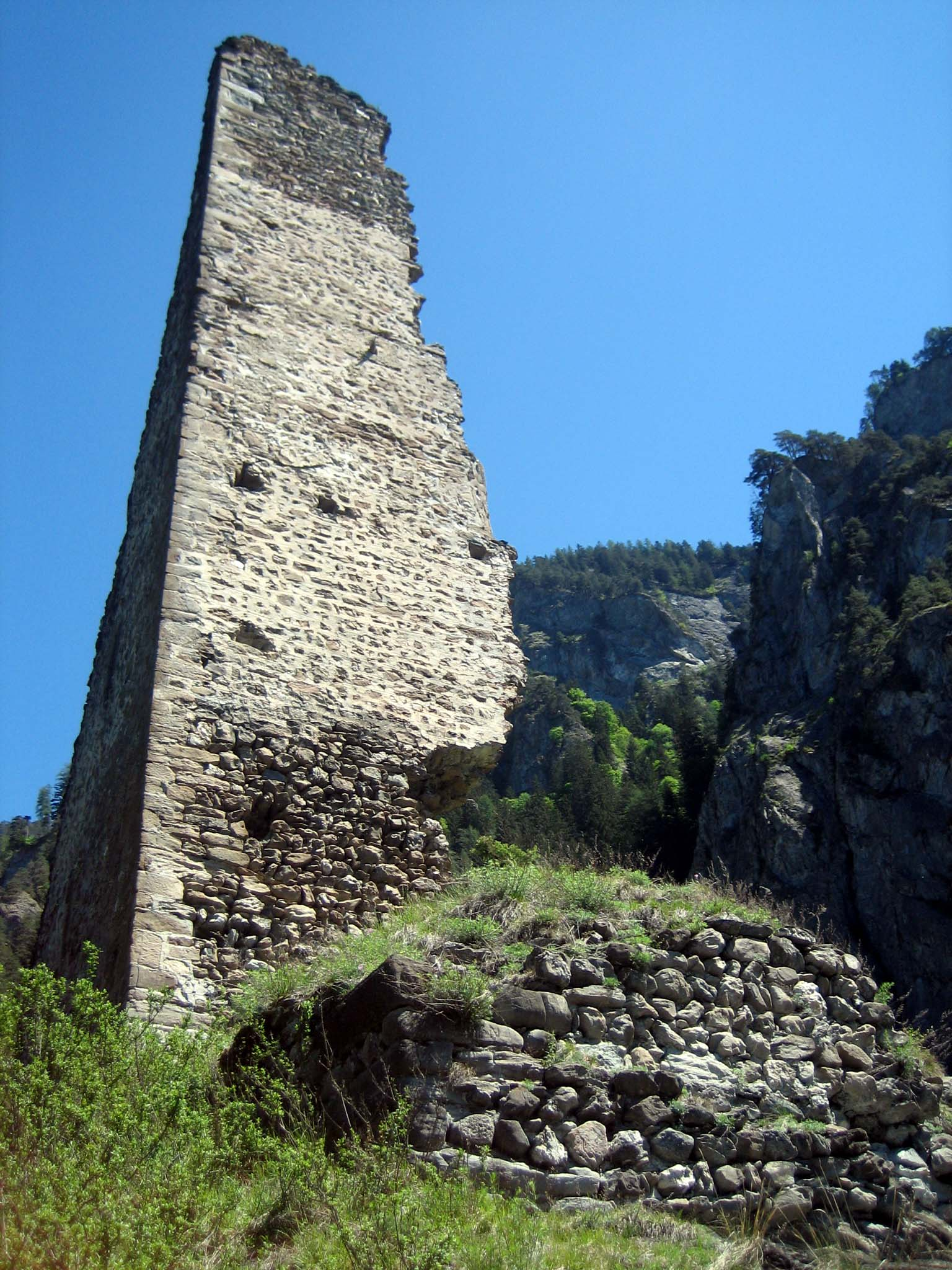
Ruins of Hochjuvalt castle

The ruins of Hochjuvalt Castle are listed as a Swiss heritage sites of national significance.

== Weather ==
Rothenbrunnen has an average of 101.1 days of rain per year and on average receives 850 mm (33 in) of precipitation. The wettest month is August during which time Rothenbrunnen receives an average of 105 mm (4.1 in) of precipitation. During this month there is precipitation for an average of 10.9 days. The driest month of the year is February with an average of 45 mm (1.8 in) of precipitation over 10.9 days.

== Transportation ==
Rhaetian Railway operate services to Rothenbrunnen (Rhaetian Railway station).
