= Feldis/Veulden =

- Former municipality
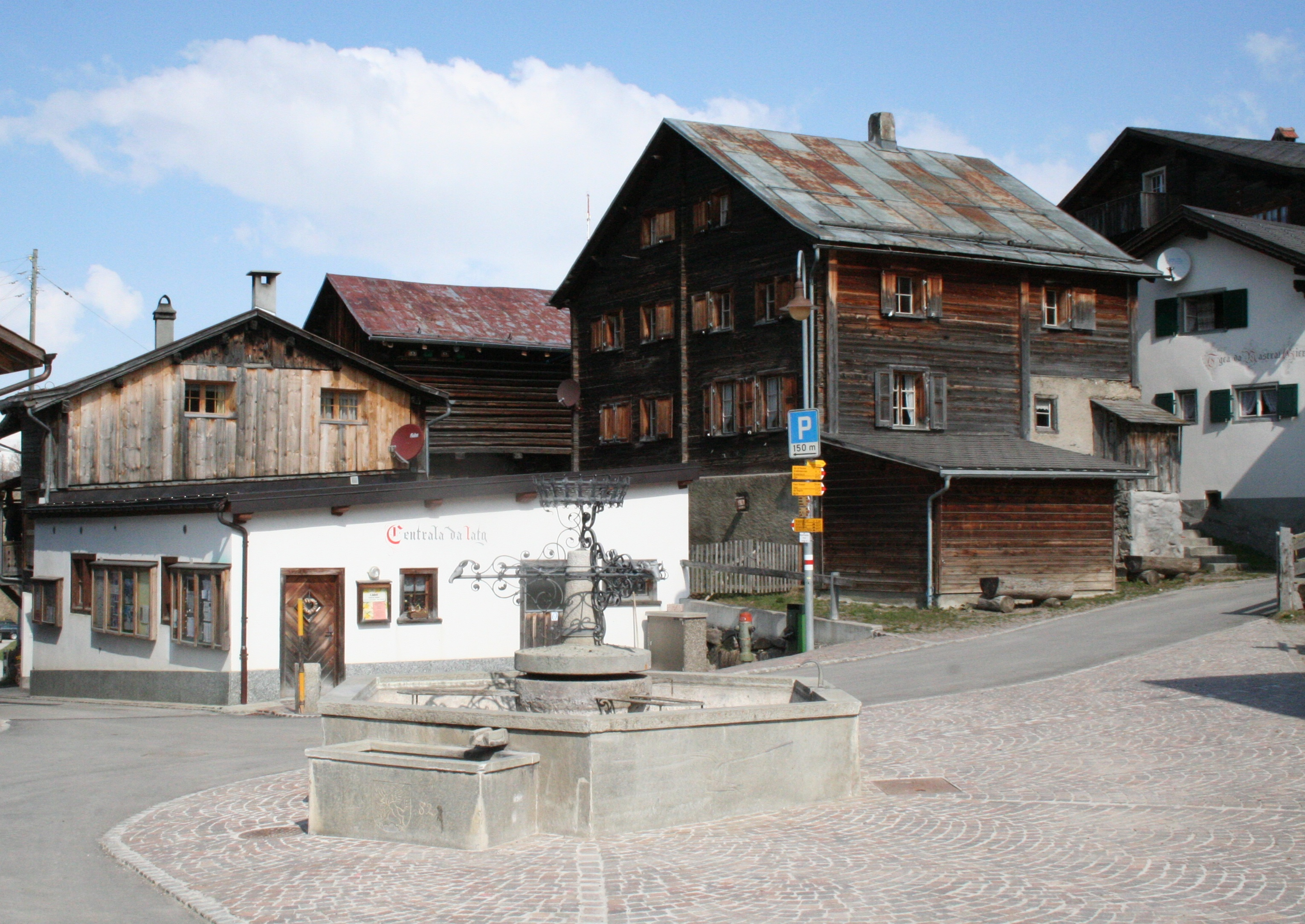
- Feldis village center and fountain

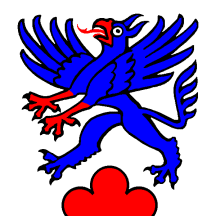
- Flag Coat of arms
- Location of Feldis/Veulden
- Location within Switzerland Location within Canton of Graubünden
- Coordinates: 46°47′N 9°25′E
- Country: Switzerland
- Canton: Graubünden
- District: Domleschg

Government
  - Mayor: Gisula Tscharner

Area
  - Total: 7.57 km^{2} (2.92 sq mi)
- Elevation: 1,470 m (4,820 ft)

Population (December 2007)
  - Total: 140
  - Density: 18/km^{2} (48/sq mi)
- Time zone: UTC+01:00 (CET)
  - Summer (DST): UTC+02:00 (CEST)
- Postal code: 7404
- SFOS number: 3632
- ISO 3166 code: CH-GR
- Surrounded by: Domat/Ems, Rothenbrunnen, Scheid
- Website: www.feldis.ch

Feldis/Veulden is a village in the municipality of Domleschg in the Viamala Region of the Swiss canton of Graubünden. Formerly its own municipality, Feldis merged with surrounding municipalities in 2009 to form the municipality of Tomils and again in 2015 to form the municipality of Domleschg.

== History ==
Feldis/Veulden is first mentioned around 1290-98 as Felden.

== Geography ==
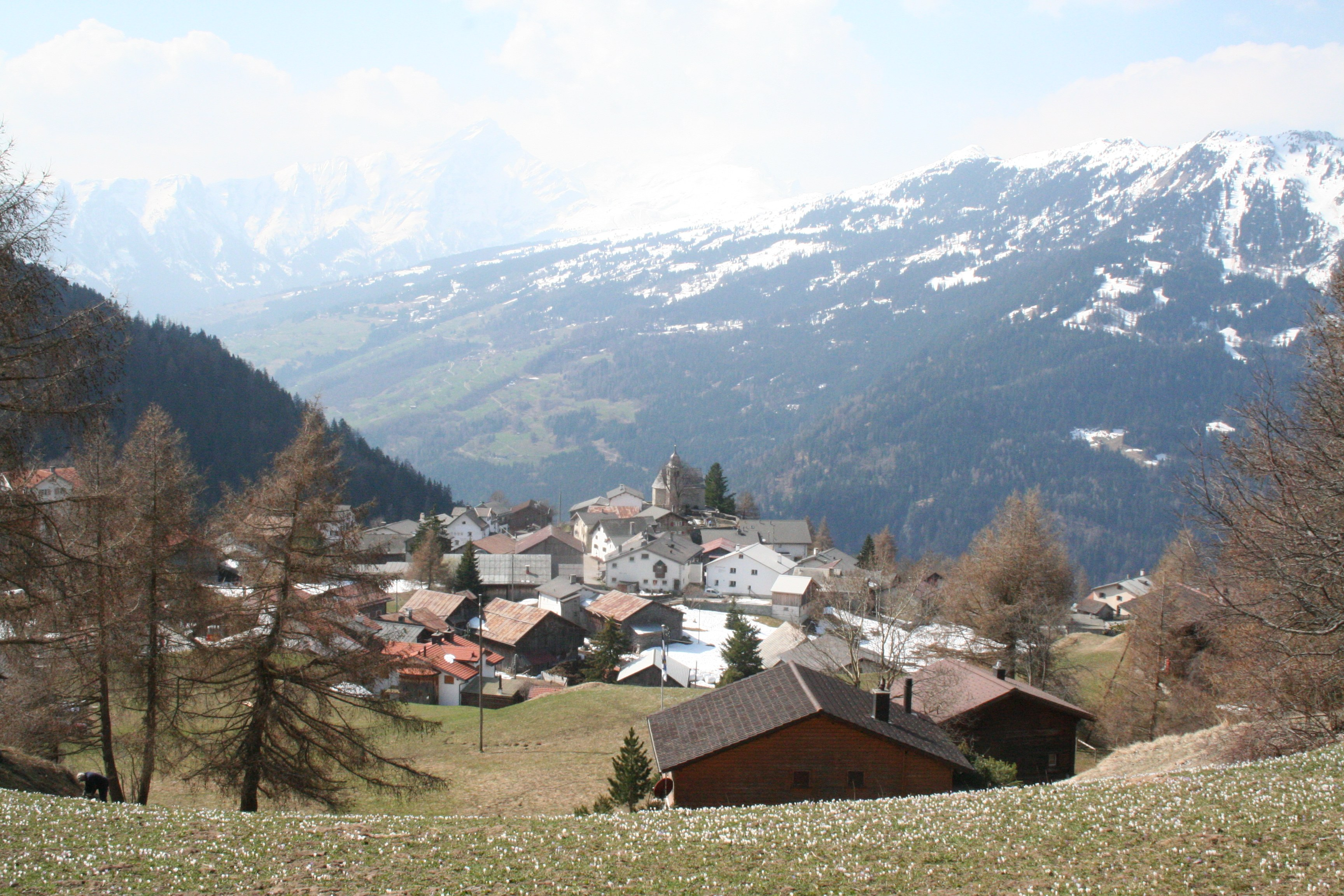
Feldis/Veulden looking southwest

Aerial view by Walter Mittelholzer (1925)

Feldis/Veulden has an area, as of 2006, of 7.6 km^{2} (2.9 sq mi). Of this area, 35.4% is used for agricultural purposes, while 57.1% is forested. Of the rest of the land, 1.8% is settled (buildings or roads) and the remainder (5.7%) is non-productive (rivers, glaciers or mountains).

The municipality is located in the Domleschg district. It is a Haufendorf (an irregular, unplanned and quite closely packed village, built around a central square) on a terrace at an elevation of 1,469 m (4,820 ft) on the eastern side of the Hinterrhein valley. Until 1943 Feldis/Veulden was known as Feldis.

== Demographics ==
Feldis/Veulden has a population (as of 2007) of 140, of which 8.6% are foreign nationals. Over the last 10 years the population has grown at a rate of 0.7%.

As of 2000, the gender distribution of the population was 42.9% male and 57.1% female. The age distribution, as of 2000, in Feldis/Veulden is; 14 people or 10.9% of the population are between 0 and 9 years old. 16 people or 12.4% are 10 to 14, and 6 people or 4.7% are 15 to 19. Of the adult population, 6 people or 4.7% of the population are between 20 and 29 years old. 9 people or 7.0% are 30 to 39, 32 people or 24.8% are 40 to 49, and 13 people or 10.1% are 50 to 59. The senior population distribution is 12 people or 9.3% of the population are between 60 and 69 years old, 16 people or 12.4% are 70 to 79, there are 4 people or 3.1% who are 80 to 89, and there are 1 people or 0.8% who are 90 to 99.

In the 2007 federal election the most popular party was the SPS which received 41.7% of the vote. The next three most popular parties were the SVP (36.5%), the FDP (15.3%) and the CVP (5.2%).

The entire Swiss population is generally well educated. In Feldis/Veulden about 80.7% of the population (between age 25-64) have completed either non-mandatory upper secondary education or additional higher education (either University or a Fachhochschule).

Feldis/Veulden has an unemployment rate of 0.66%. As of 2005, there were 16 people employed in the primary economic sector and about 8 businesses involved in this sector. 3 people are employed in the secondary sector and there is 1 business in this sector. 31 people are employed in the tertiary sector, with 9 businesses in this sector.

The historical population is given in the following table:

year	population
1803	156
1850	164
1900	130
1950	176
1980	107
2000	129

== Languages ==
Historically Romansch in the dialect of Sutsilvan was the primary language spoken in Feldis. However, since 1900, there has been a rapid shift from Romansch to German. Today, the municipality is predominantly German-speaking, with a small Romansh minority. As of 2000, 85.3% of the population speaks German, with Romansh being second most common (14.0%) and French being third ( 0.8%).

Languages in Feldis/Veulden
Language	Census of 1900		Census of 1970		Census of 1980		Census of 1990		Census of 2000	
Language	Number	Percentage	Number	Percentage	Number	Percentage	Number	Percentage	Number	Percentage
German	4	3.08%	73	48.03%	54	51.92%	89	74.17%	110	85.94%
Romansh	126	96.92%	75	49.34%	50	48.08%	31	25.83%	18	14.06%
Italian	0	0.00%	0	0.00%	0	0.00%	0	0.00%	0	0.00%
Population	130	100%	152	100%	104	100%	120	100%	128	100%
