= Domleschg (Kreis) =

Coordinates: 46°43′N 9°26′E

Kreis Domleschg Kreis Domleschg
- Sub-district
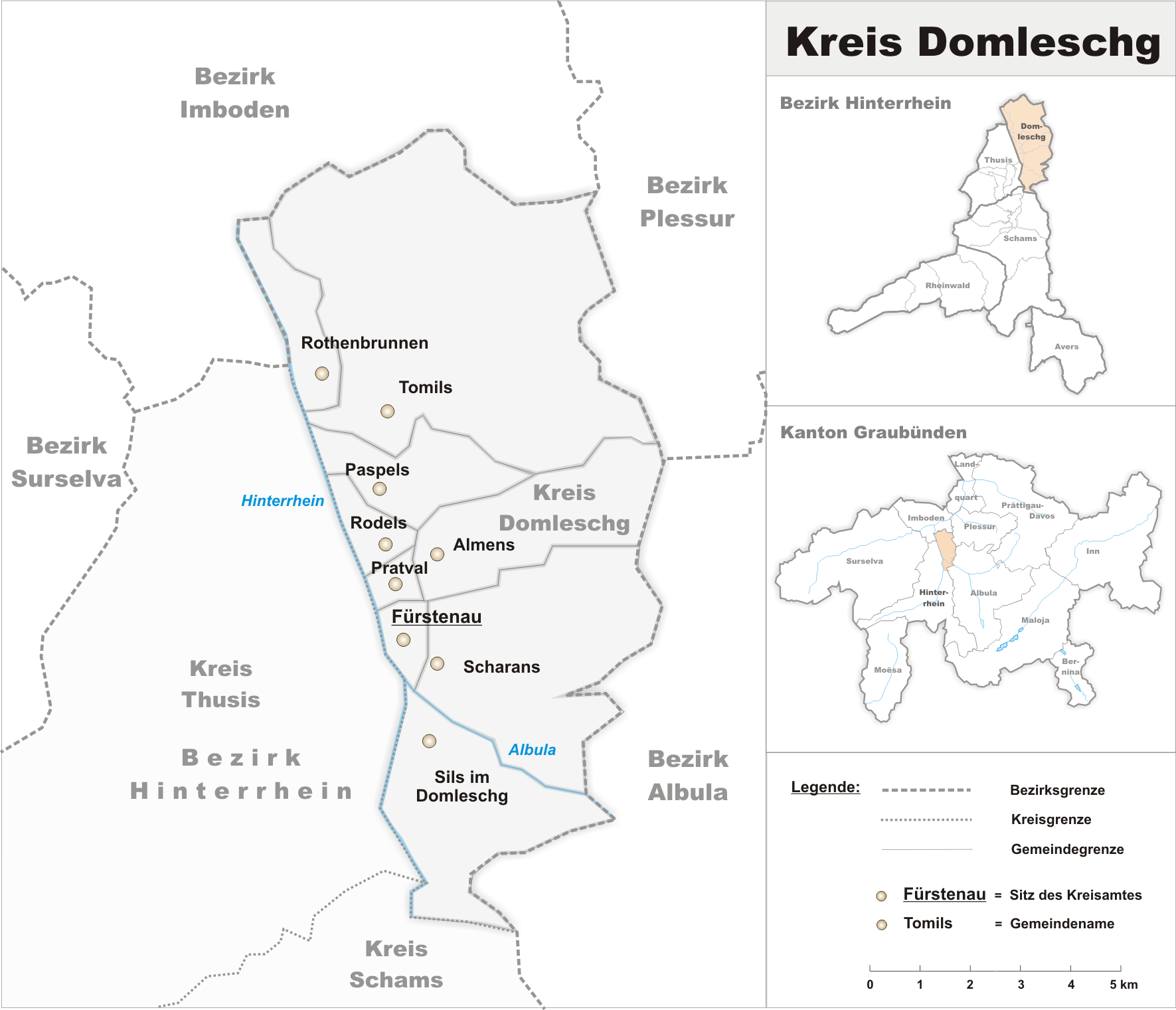
- Country: Switzerland
- Canton: Graubünden
- Capital: Fürstenau

Area
  - Total: 73.94 km^{2} (28.55 sq mi)

Population (2009)
  - Total: 4,278
  - Density: 57.86/km^{2} (149.9/sq mi)
- Time zone: UTC+1 (CET)
  - Summer (DST): UTC+2 (CEST)
- Municipalities: 5

The Kreis Domleschg forms, together with the sub-districts of Avers, Rheinwald, Schams and Thusis, the Hinterrhein District of the Canton Graubünden in Switzerland. The district office is located in Fürstenau.

== Geography ==
Geographically, the Kreis is located in the lower part of the Hinterrhein, below the Viamala gorge, on the left bank of the river. This part of the valley is known as the Domleschg/Heinzenberg valley. The right bank forms the Kreis Thusis.

== Municipalities ==
Coat of arms	Name	Residents (Dec. 2009)	Area in km^{2}	BFS No.
	Domleschg	2,160	45.94	3673
Fürstenau	Fürstenau	350	1.32	3633
Rothenbrunnen	Rothenbrunnen	304	3.11	3637
Scharans	Scharans	796	14.29	3638
Sils im Domleschg	Sils im Domleschg	971	9.28	3640

== Mergers ==
On 1 January 2015 the former municipalities of Almens, Paspels, Pratval, Rodels and Tomils merged to form the new municipality of Domleschg.
