= Avers (Kreis) =

Coordinates: 46°28′N 9°30′E

Kreis Avers Kreis Avers
- Sub-district
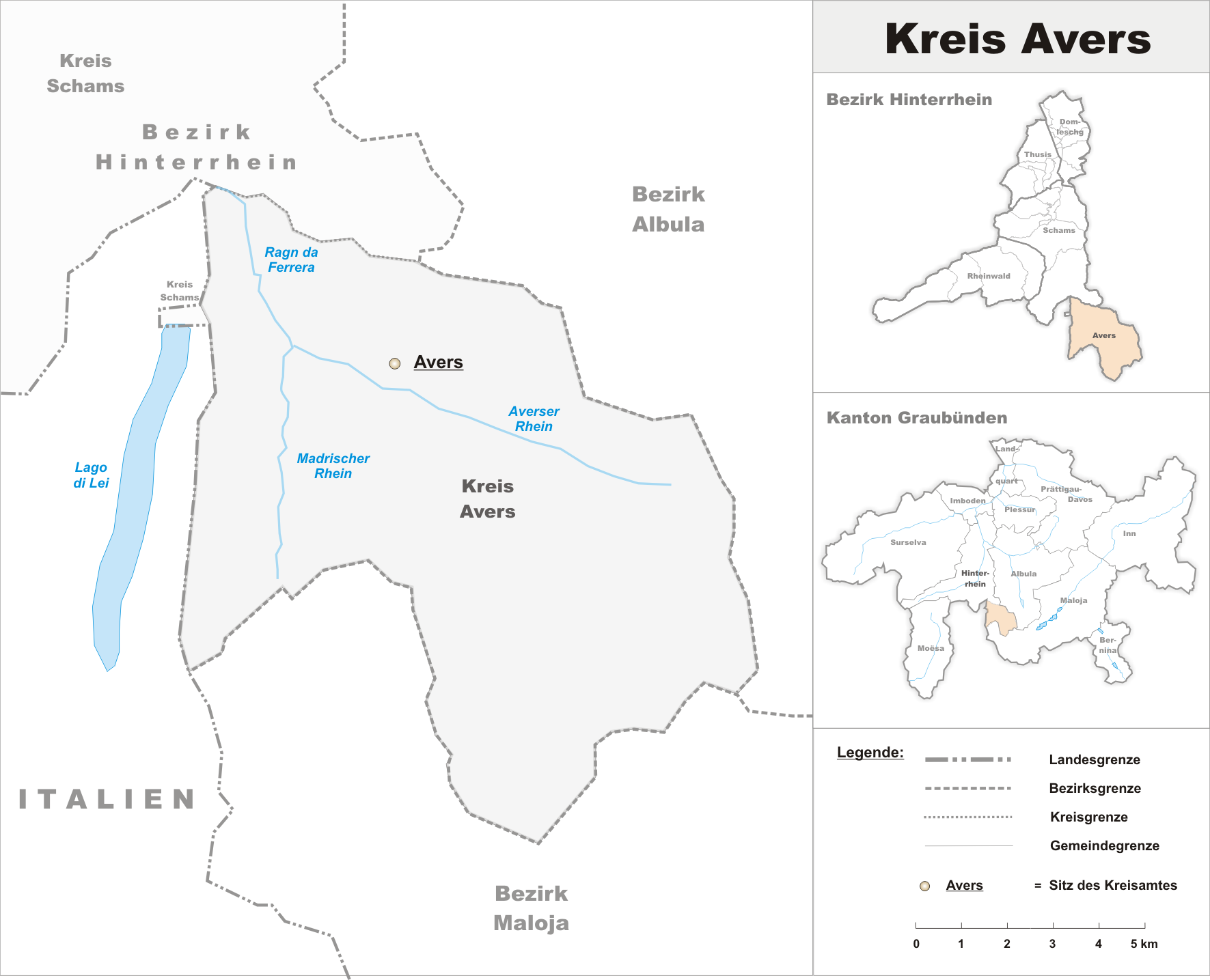
- Country: Switzerland
- Canton: Graubünden
- Capital: Avers

Area
  - Total: 93.12 km^{2} (35.95 sq mi)

Population (2009)
  - Total: 164
  - Density: 1.76/km^{2} (4.56/sq mi)
- Time zone: UTC+1 (CET)
  - Summer (DST): UTC+2 (CEST)
- Municipalities: 1

The Kreis Avers forms, together with the Kreise of Domleschg, Rheinwald, Schams and Thusis the Bezirk ("district") of Hinterrhein of the Canton of Graubünden in Switzerland. The seat of the sub-district office is in Avers.

== Municipalities ==
The Kreis ("sub-district") contains only one municipality:

Coat of arms	Name	Residents (Dec. 2009)	Area in km^{2}	BFS No.
Avers	Avers	164	48.30	3681
