= Schams (Kreis) =

Kreis Schams Kreis Schams
- Sub-district
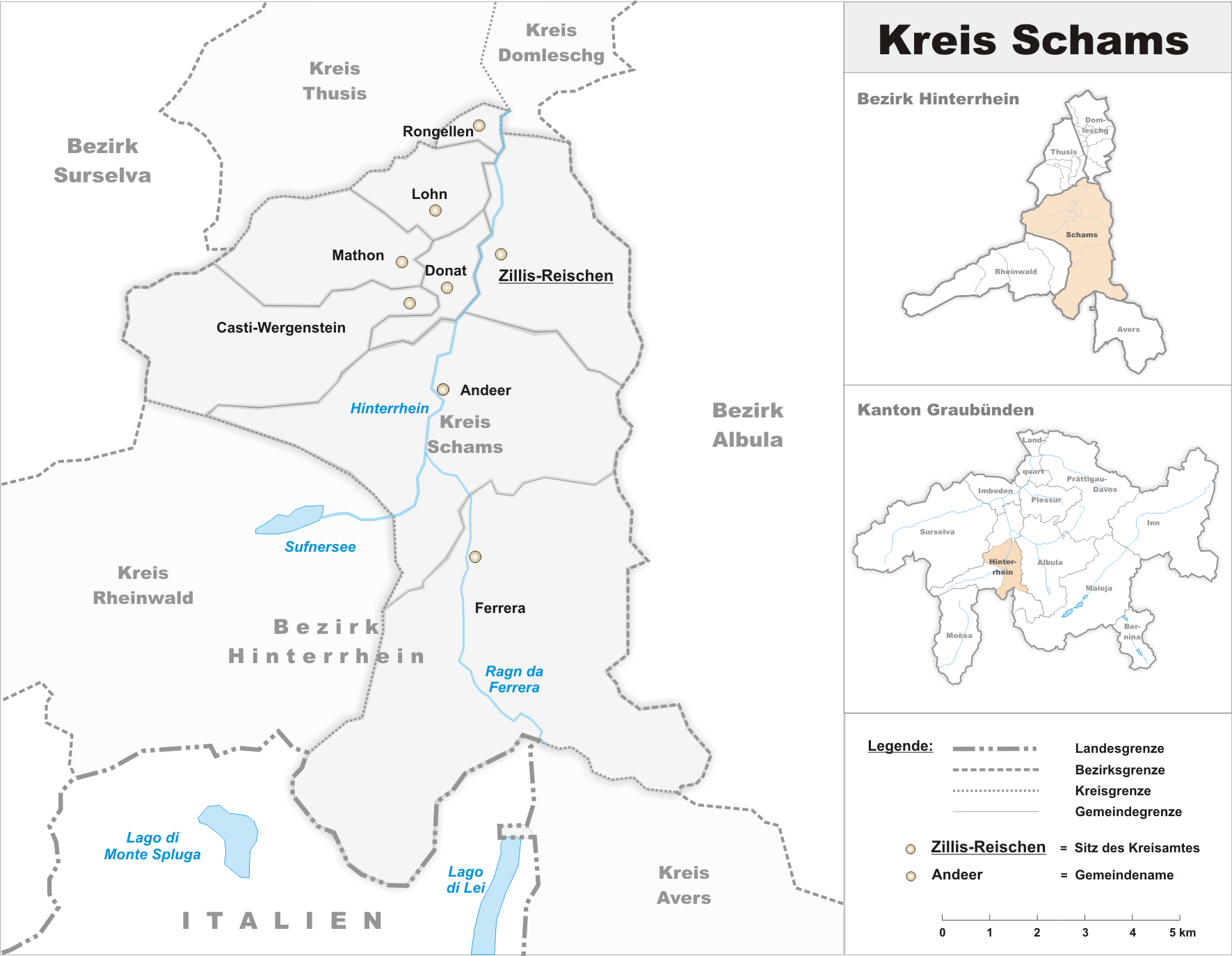
- Country: Switzerland
- Canton: Graubünden
- Capital: Zillis-Reischen

Area
  - Total: 201.85 km^{2} (77.93 sq mi)

Population (2009)
  - Total: 1,802
  - Density: 8.927/km^{2} (23.12/sq mi)
- Time zone: UTC+1 (CET)
  - Summer (DST): UTC+2 (CEST)
- Municipalities: 8

The Kreis Schams forms, together with the sub-districts of Avers, Domleschg, Rheinwald and Thusis, the Bezirk ("district") Hinterrhein of the Canton Graubünden in Switzerland. The district office is located in Zillis-Reischen.

== Geography ==
Geographically, the Kreis is equivalent to the Schams valley, the middle section of the Hinterrhein valley south of the Viamala gorge.

Coat of arms	Name	Residents (Dec. 2009)	Area in km^{2}	BFS No.
Andeer	Andeer	916	46.30	3701
Casti-Wergenstein	Casti-Wergenstein	56	25.62	3703
Donat	Donat	203	4.67	3705
Ferrera	Ferrera	79	75.46	3713
Lohn	Lohn	51	8.17	3707
Mathon	Mathon	53	15.13	3708
Rongellen	Rongellen	56	2.02	3711
Zillis-Reischen	Zillis-Reischen	389	24.48	3712
