= Schauenstein Castle (Graubünden) =

Castle in Fürstenau, Switzerland

Coordinates: 46°43′17″N 9°26′46″E

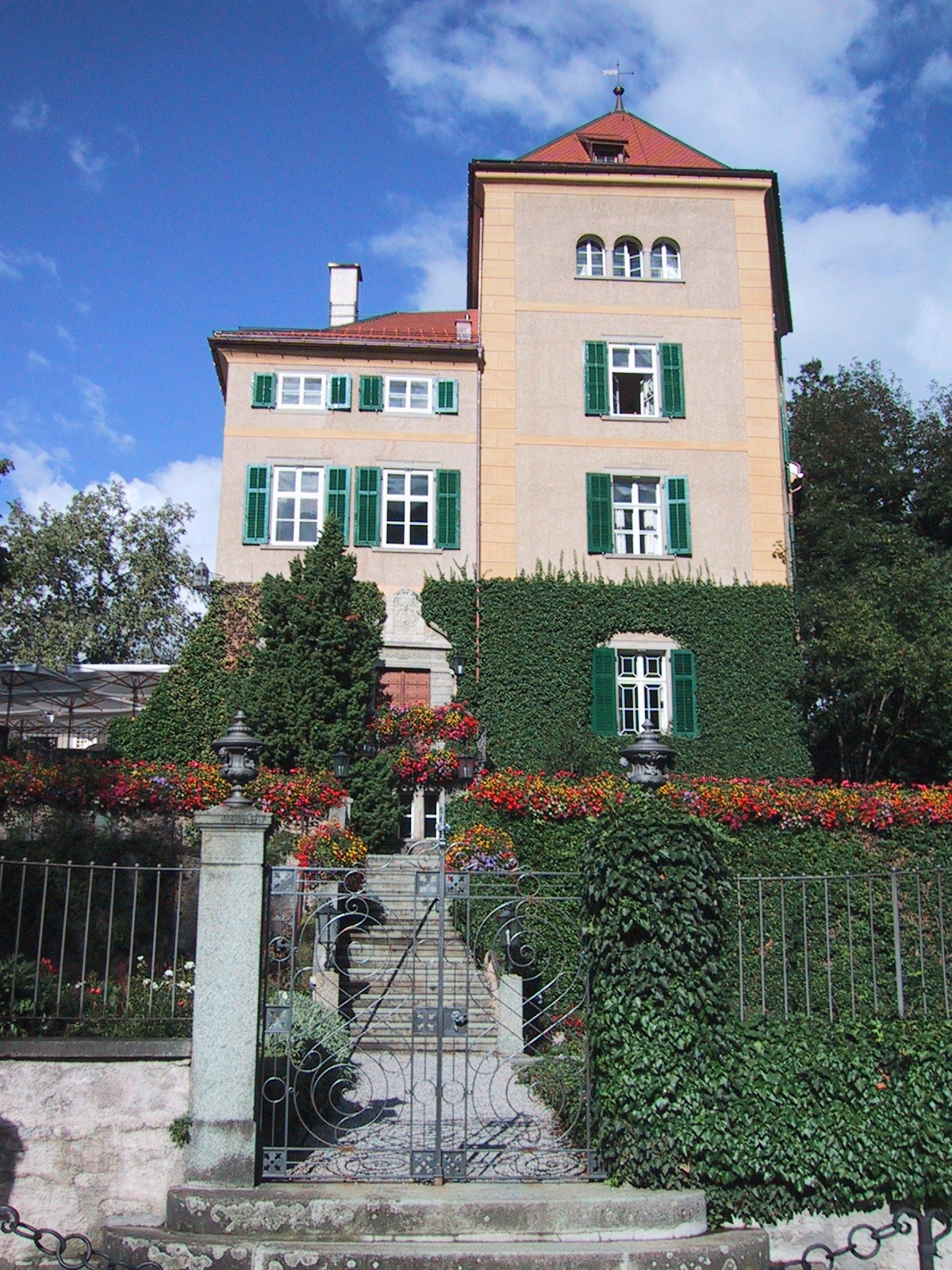
Schauenstein Castle

Schauenstein Castle is a castle in the municipality of Fürstenau of the Canton of Graubünden in Switzerland. It is a Swiss heritage site of national significance.

== See also ==
- List of castles in Switzerland
