= Rheinwald (Kreis) =

Coordinates: 46.5460°N 9.3000°E

Kreis Rheinwald Kreis Rheinwald
- Sub-district
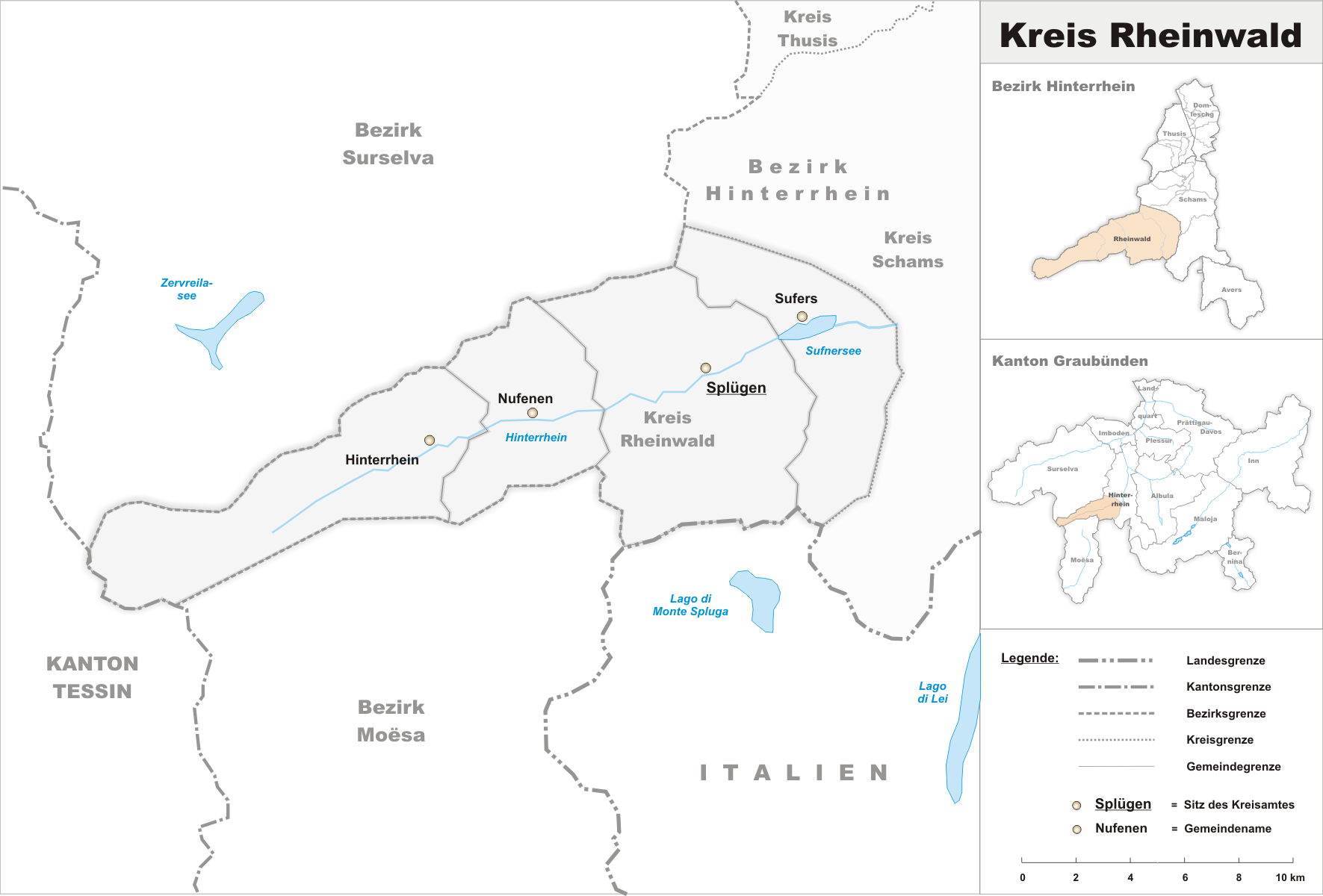
- Country: Switzerland
- Canton: Graubünden
- Capital: Splügen

Area
  - Total: 171.94 km^{2} (66.39 sq mi)

Population (2009)
  - Total: 780
  - Density: 4.5/km^{2} (12/sq mi)
- Time zone: UTC+1 (CET)
  - Summer (DST): UTC+2 (CEST)
- Municipalities: 4

The Kreis Rheinwald forms, together with the Kreise of Avers, Domleschg, Schams and Thusis the Hinterrhein District (Bezirk Hinterrhein) of the Canton of Graubünden in Switzerland. The seat of the sub-district office is in Splügen.

== Municipalities ==
The Kreis ("sub-district") is composed of the following municipalities:

| Coat of arms | Name | Residents (Dec. 2009) | Area in km^{2} | BFS No. |
|---|---|---|---|---|
| Hinterrhein | Hinterrhein | 61 | 48.30 | 3691 |
| Nufenen | Nufenen | 139 | 28.03 | 3693 |
| Splügen | Splügen | 377 | 60.49 | 3694 |
| Sufers | Sufers | 146 | 34.62 | 3695 |
