= Canovasee =

Lake in Graubünden, Switzerland

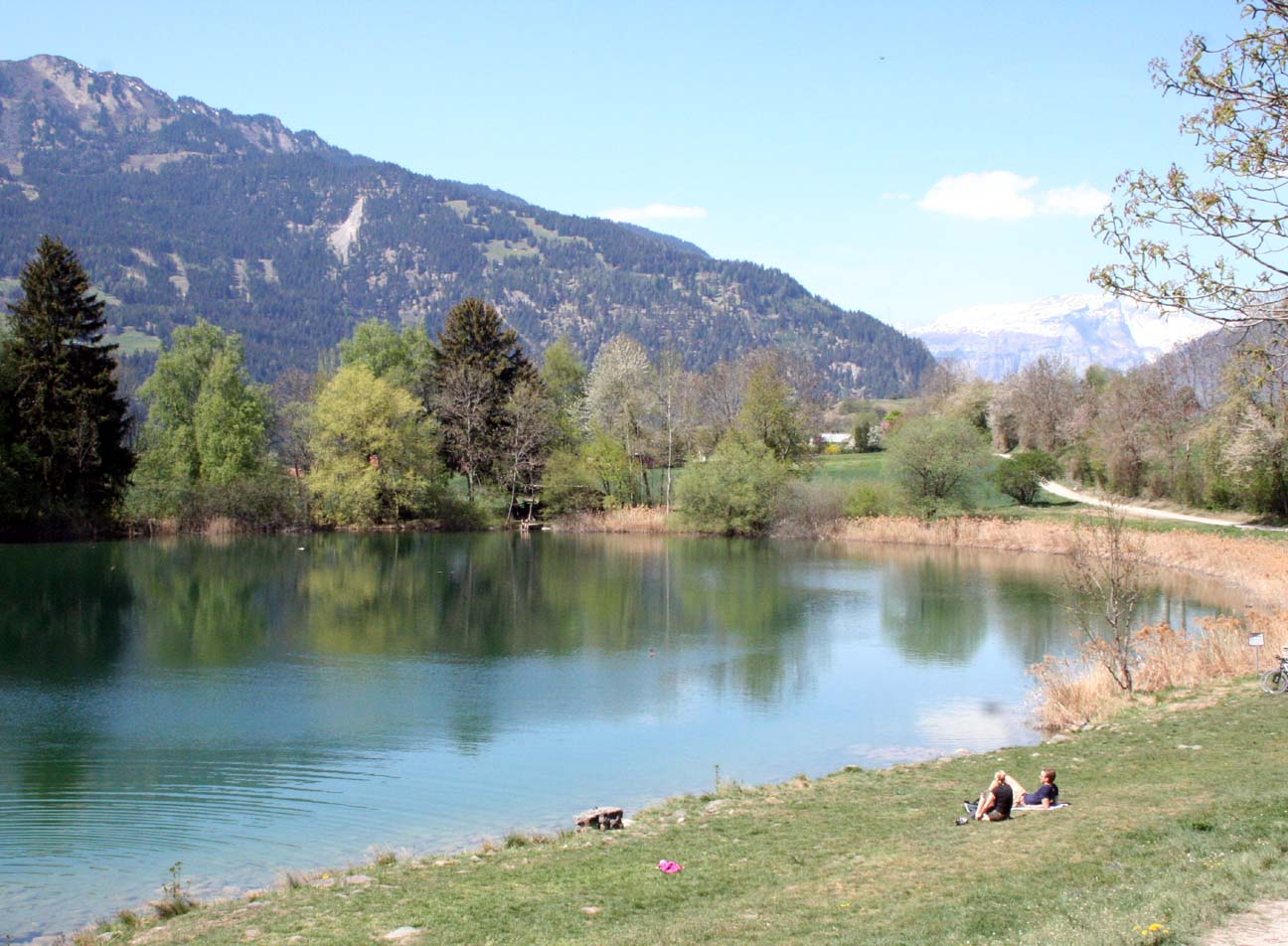

- Location within Canton of Graubünden Location within Switzerland Location within Italy Location within Alps
- Interactive map of Canovasee
- Location: Paspels, Grisons
- Coordinates: 46°44′47″N 9°27′3″E
- Basin countries: Switzerland
- Max. length: 150 m (490 ft)
- Max. width: 100 m (330 ft)
- Surface area: 1.5 ha (3.7 acres)
- Max. depth: 10 m (33 ft)
- Surface elevation: 777 m (2,549 ft)

Canovasee (Romansh: Lag or Leg da Canova) is a lake in Paspels, Grisons, Switzerland.

In 2004, the "First Love, Last Rites" (by Susanne Kaelin and released 2006) was filmed at the lake.
