= Thusis (Kreis) =

Sub-district in Graubünden, Switzerland

Kreis Thusis Kreis Thusis
- Sub-district
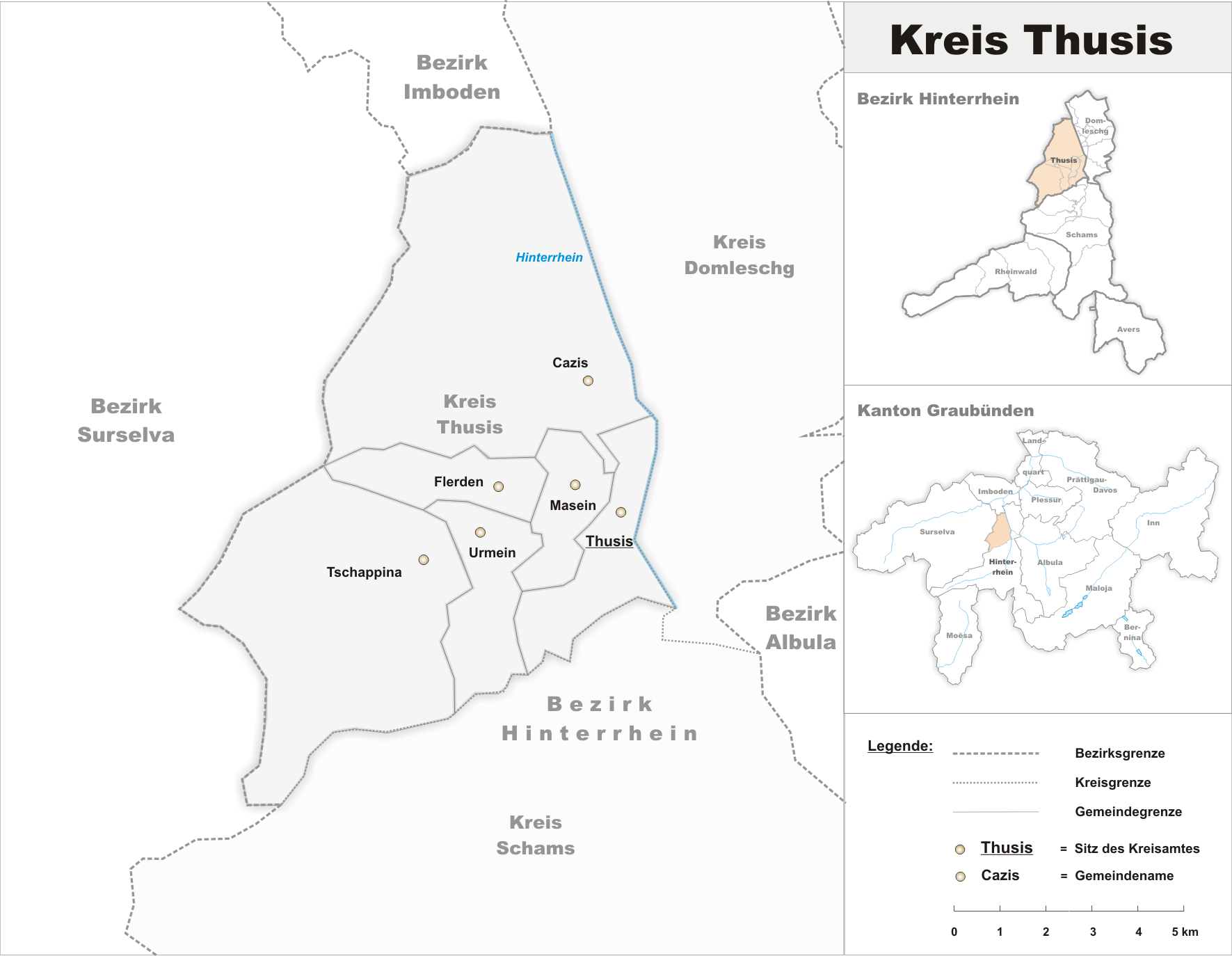
- Country: Switzerland
- Canton: Graubünden
- Capital: Thusis

Area
  - Total: 77.28 km^{2} (29.84 sq mi)

Population (2009)
  - Total: 5,080
  - Density: 65.7/km^{2} (170/sq mi)
- Time zone: UTC+1 (CET)
  - Summer (DST): UTC+2 (CEST)
- Municipalities: 6

The Kreis Thusis forms, together with the sub-districts of Avers, Domleschg, Rheinwald and Schams, the Bezirk ("district") Hinterrhein of the Canton Graubünden in Switzerland. The district office is located in Thusis.

Coat of arms	Name	Residents (Dec. 2009)	Area in km^{2}	BFS No.
Cazis	Cazis	2,287	31.18	3661
Flerden	Flerden	247	6.09	3662
Masein	Masein	500	4.20	3663
Thusis	Thusis	9,453	6.81	3668
Tschappina	Tschappina	134	24.67	3669
Urmein	Urmein	150	4.33	3670
