= Pratval =

- Former municipality
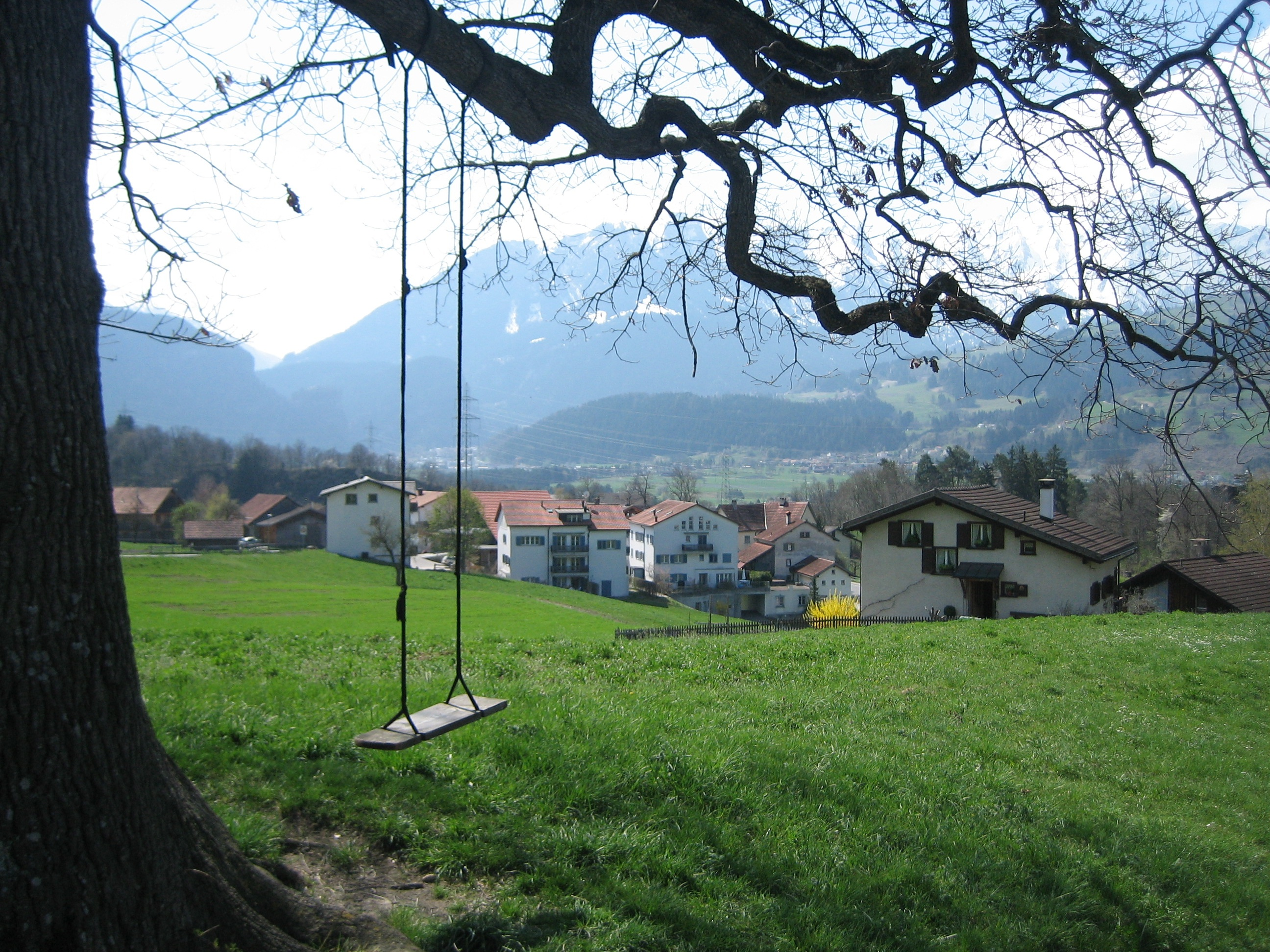

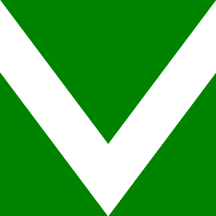
- Flag Coat of arms
- Location of Pratval
- Location within Switzerland Location within Canton of Graubünden
- Coordinates: 46°43′N 9°26′E
- Country: Switzerland
- Canton: Graubünden
- District: Hinterrhein

Area
  - Total: 0.77 km^{2} (0.30 sq mi)
- Elevation: 687 m (2,254 ft)

Population (December 2020)
  - Total: 241
  - Density: 310/km^{2} (810/sq mi)
- Time zone: UTC+01:00 (CET)
  - Summer (DST): UTC+02:00 (CEST)
- Postal code: 7415
- SFOS number: 3635
- ISO 3166 code: CH-GR
- Surrounded by: Almens, Cazis, Fürstenau, Rodels
- Website: www.domleschg.ch

Pratval is a former municipality in the district of Hinterrhein in the Swiss canton of Graubünden. On 1 January 2015 the former municipalities of Almens, Paspels, Pratval, Rodels and Tomils merged to form the new municipality of Domleschg.

== History ==
Pratval is first mentioned in 1345 as Prau de Valle.

== Geography ==
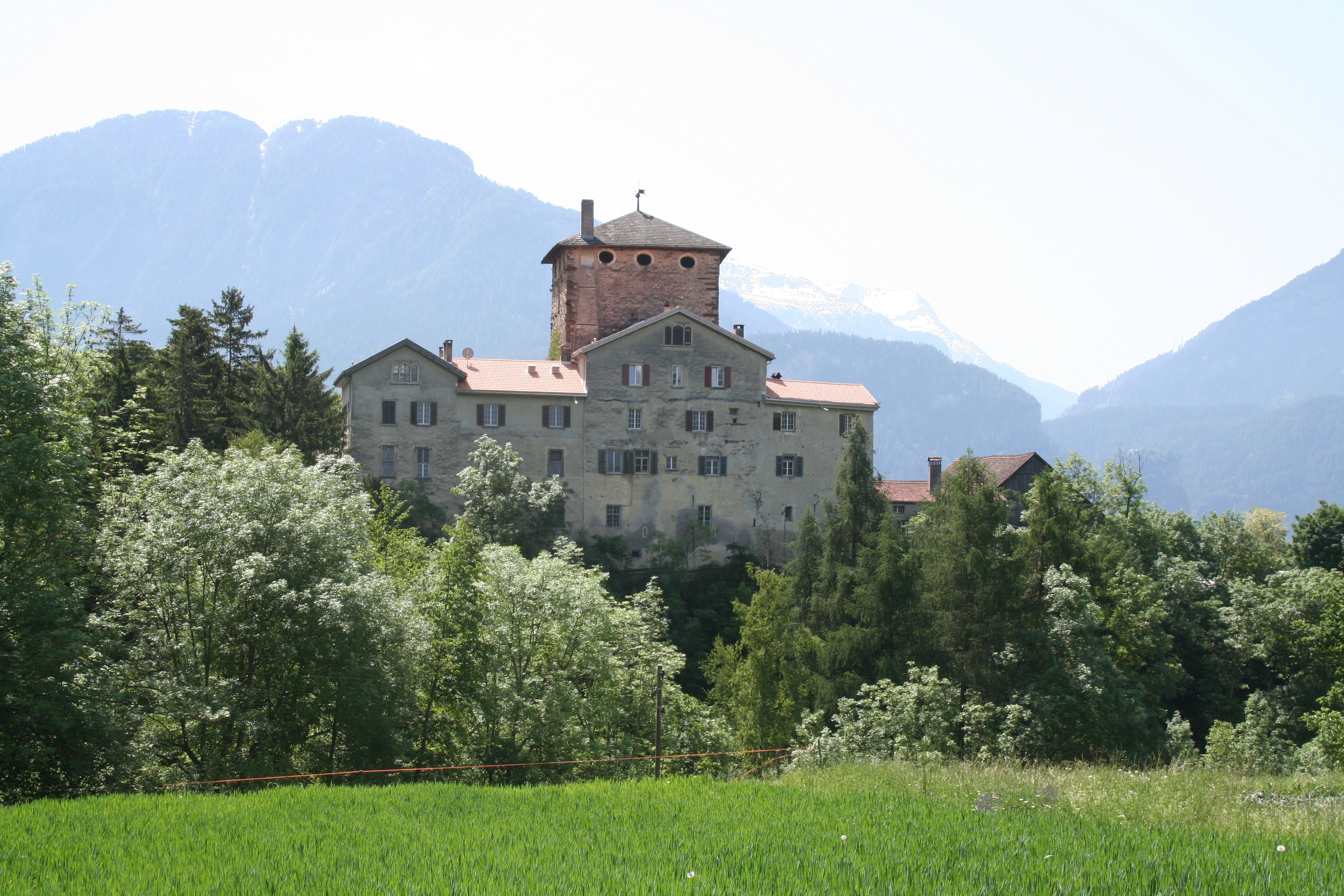
Schloss Reitberg near Pratval

Before the merger, Pratval had a total area of 0.8 km^{2} (0.31 mi^{2}). It is the smallest municipality in Graubünden. Of this area, 55% is used for agricultural purposes, while 26.3% is forested. Of the rest of the land, 17.5% is settled (buildings or roads) and the remainder (1.3%) is non-productive (rivers, glaciers or mountains).

The former municipality is located in the Domleschg sub-district, of the Hinterrhein district. It consists of the settlements of Gross- and Kleinrietberg, Rietbach, Mühle and Hof. All five settlements are located on a plateau east of the Hinterrhine river.

== Demographics ==
Pratval had a population (as of 2013) of 254. As of 2008, 4.7% of the population was made up of foreign nationals. Over the last 10 years the population has decreased at a rate of -5.6%.

As of 2000, the gender distribution of the population was 44.0% male and 56.0% female. The age distribution, as of 2000, in Pratval is; 41 people or 17.1% of the population are between 0 and 9 years old. 17 people or 7.1% are 10 to 14, and 14 people or 5.8% are 15 to 19. Of the adult population, 17 people or 7.1% of the population are between 20 and 29 years old. 51 people or 21.3% are 30 to 39, 48 people or 20.0% are 40 to 49, and 15 people or 6.3% are 50 to 59. The senior population distribution is 16 people or 6.7% of the population are between 60 and 69 years old, 13 people or 5.4% are 70 to 79, there are 8 people or 3.3% who are 80 to 89.

In the 2007 federal election the most popular party was the SPS which received 41.9% of the vote. The next three most popular parties were the SVP (27.6%), the FDP (16.8%) and the CVP (6.9%).

In Pratval about 84.4% of the population (between age 25–64) have completed either non-mandatory upper secondary education or additional higher education (either university or a Fachhochschule).

Pratval has an unemployment rate of 0.14%. As of 2005, there were 15 people employed in the primary economic sector and about 4 businesses involved in this sector. 2 people are employed in the secondary sector and there is 1 business in this sector. 15 people are employed in the tertiary sector, with 5 businesses in this sector.

The historical population is given in the following table:

year	population
1850	82
1900	67
1950	83
1960	97
1970	88
1980	128
1990	178
2000	240

== Languages ==
Most of the population (as of 2000) speaks German (94.6%), with Romansh being second most common ( 4.2%) and French being third ( 0.4%).

Languages in Pratval
Languages	Census 1980		Census 1990		Census 2000	
Languages	Number	Percent	Number	Percent	Number	Percent
German	115	89.84%	172	96.63%	227	94.58%
Romanish	9	7.03%	3	1.69%	10	4.17%
Total	128	100%	178	100%	240	100%
