= Paspels =

- Former municipality
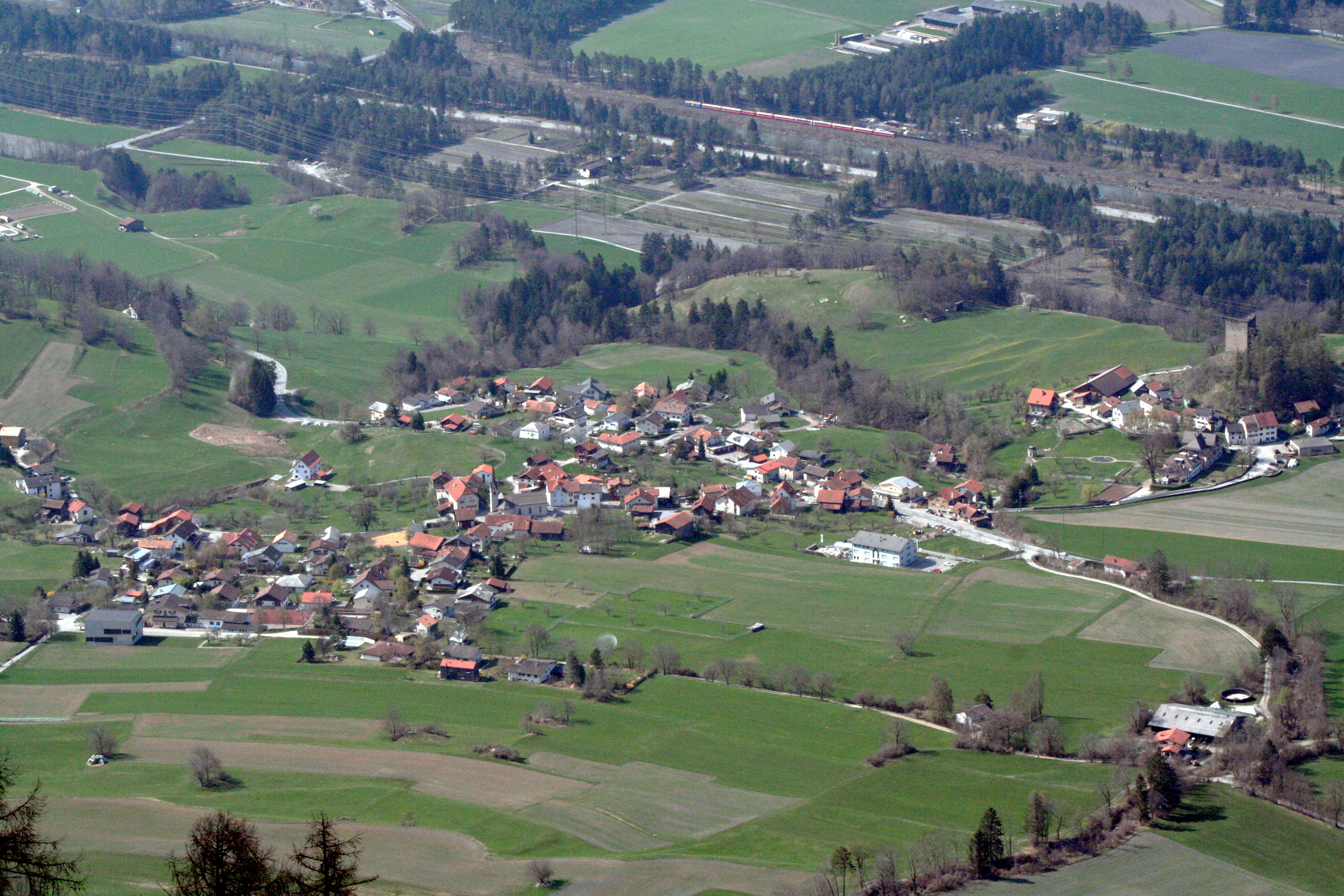

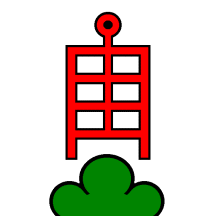
- Flag Coat of arms
- Location of Paspels
- Location within Switzerland Location within Canton of Graubünden
- Coordinates: 46°44′N 9°26′E
- Country: Switzerland
- Canton: Graubünden
- District: Hinterrhein

Area
  - Total: 4.59 km^{2} (1.77 sq mi)
- Elevation: 778 m (2,552 ft)

Population (Dec 2013)
  - Total: 475
  - Density: 103/km^{2} (268/sq mi)
- Time zone: UTC+01:00 (CET)
  - Summer (DST): UTC+02:00 (CEST)
- Postal code: 7417
- SFOS number: 3634
- ISO 3166 code: CH-GR
- Surrounded by: Almens, Cazis, Rodels, Trans, Tumegl/Tomils
- Website: www.domleschg.ch

Paspels (Romansh: Pasqual) is a former municipality in the district of Hinterrhein in the Swiss canton of Graubünden. On 1 January 2015 the former municipalities of Almens, Paspels, Pratval, Rodels and Tomils merged to form the new municipality of Domleschg.

== History ==
Paspels is first mentioned in 1237 as in villa Pascuals though the original record no longer exists. In 1246 it was mentioned as de Pascuals.

== Geography ==
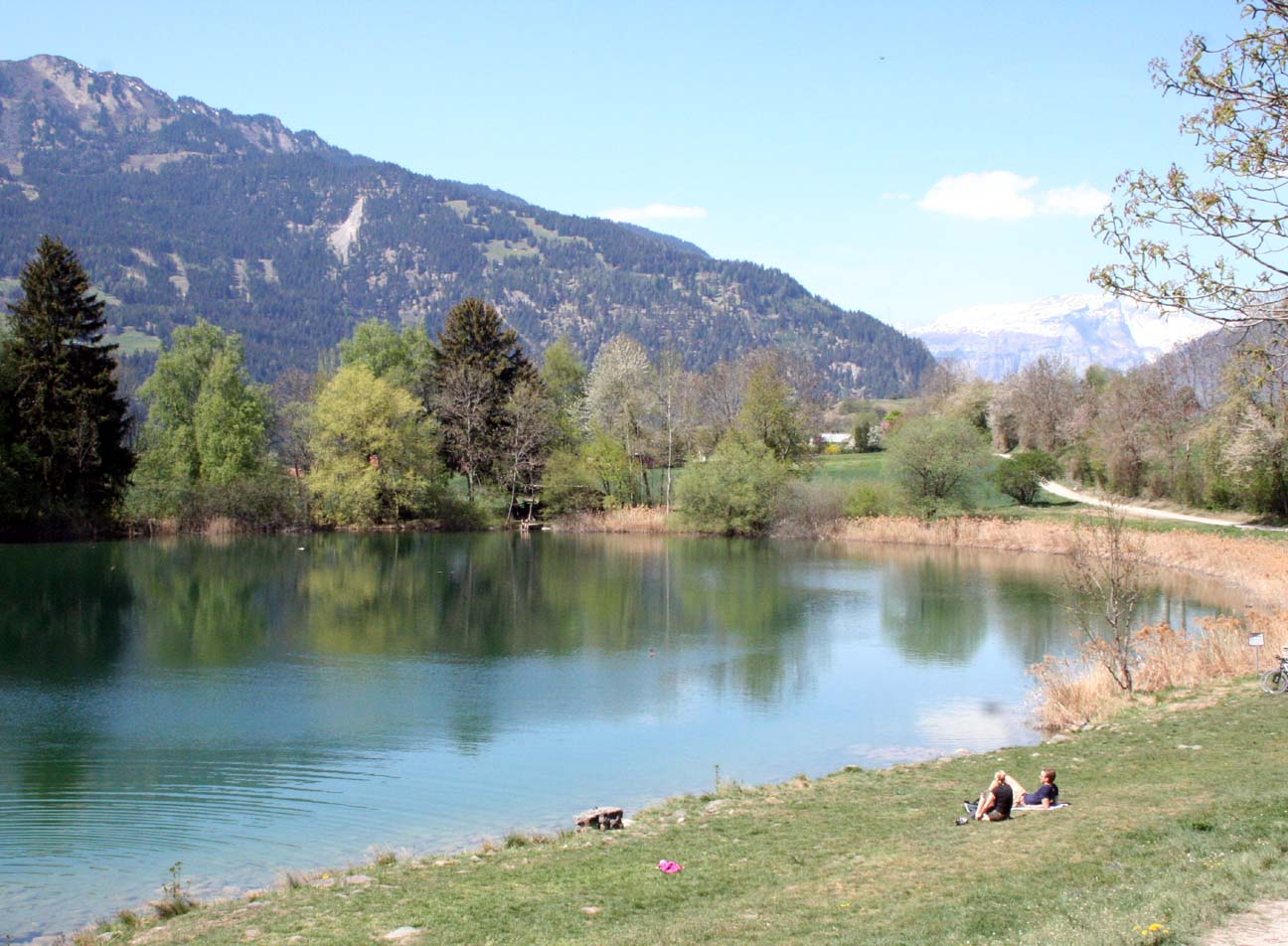
Canova lake, near Paspels

Before the merger, Paspels had a total area of 4.6 km^{2} (1.8 mi^{2}). Of this area, 33.3% is used for agricultural purposes, while 56.7% is forested. Of the rest of the land, 6.1% is settled (buildings or roads) and the remainder (3.9%) is non-productive (rivers, glaciers or mountains).

The former municipality is located in the Domleschg sub-district, of the Hinterrhein district. It consists of a linear village and a haufendorf (an irregular, unplanned and quite closely packed village, built around a central square) on a terrace above the Hinterrhine as well as the hamlets of Dusch and Canova.

Canovasee is a lake located in the municipality.

== Demographics ==
Paspels had a population (as of 2013) of 475. As of 2008, 3.1% of the population was made up of foreign nationals. Over the last 10 years the population has grown at a rate of 11.8%.

As of 2000, the gender distribution of the population was 47.4% male and 52.6% female. The age distribution, as of 2000, in Paspels is; 72 people or 17.6% of the population are between 0 and 9 years old. 29 people or 7.1% are 10 to 14, and 19 people or 4.6% are 15 to 19. Of the adult population, 26 people or 6.4% of the population are between 20 and 29 years old. 65 people or 15.9% are 30 to 39, 70 people or 17.1% are 40 to 49, and 46 people or 11.2% are 50 to 59. The senior population distribution is 38 people or 9.3% of the population are between 60 and 69 years old, 26 people or 6.4% are 70 to 79, there are 16 people or 3.9% who are 80 to 89, and there are 2 people or 0.5% who are 90 to 99.

In the 2007 federal election the most popular party was the SPS which received 39.7% of the vote. The next three most popular parties were the SVP (23%), the FDP (17.8%) and the CVP (15.7%).

In Paspels about 81.5% of the population (between age 25 and 64) have completed either non-mandatory upper secondary education or additional higher education (either university or a Fachhochschule).

Paspels has an unemployment rate of 0.6%. As of 2005, there were 18 people employed in the primary economic sector and about 6 businesses involved in this sector. 8 people are employed in the secondary sector and there are 3 businesses in this sector. 63 people are employed in the tertiary sector, with 14 businesses in this sector.

The historical population is given in the following table:

year	population
1808	245
1850	323
1900	302
1950	350
1960	286
1970	289
1980	318
1990	358
2000	409

== Languages ==
Most of the population (as of 2000) speaks German (94.4%), with Romansh being second most common ( 3.7%) and Italian being third ( 1.0%).

Languages in Paspels
Languages	Census 1980		Census 1990		Census 2000	
Languages	Number	Percent	Number	Percent	Number	Percent
German	246	77.36%	320	89.39%	386	94.38%
Romanish	63	19.81%	31	8.66%	15	3.67%
Italian	3	0.94%	3	0.84%	4	0.98%
Population	318	100%	358	100%	409	100%

== Heritage sites of national significance ==
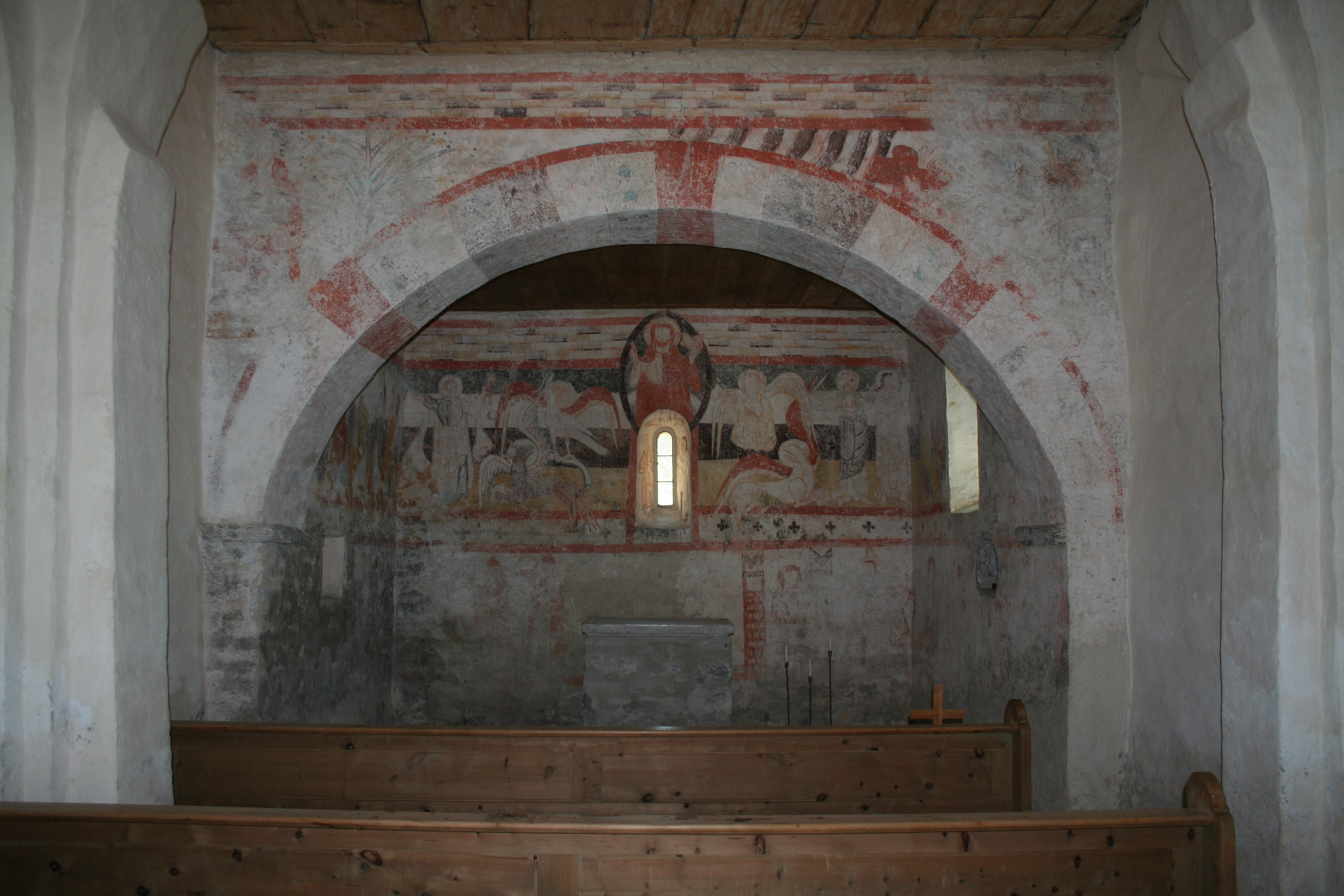
Choir of S. Luregn/St. Lorenz

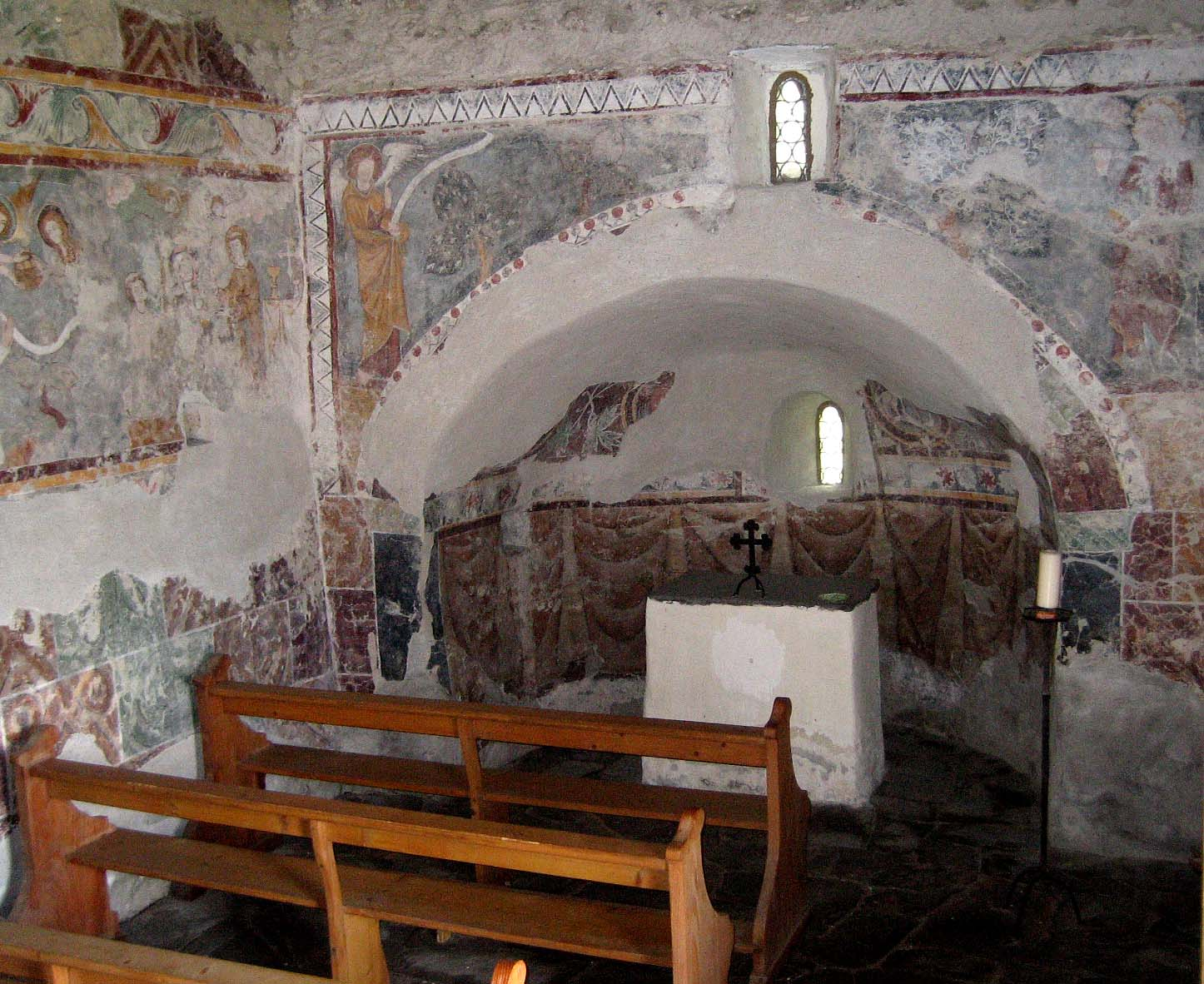
Interior of the Chapel of S. Maria-Magdalena

The Church of S. Luregn/St. Lorenz and the Chapel of S. Maria-Magdalena in the hamlet of Dusch are listed as Swiss heritage sites of national significance. The early medieval Church of S. Luregn/St. Lorenz was first mentioned in 1237. It was the parish church for the right side of the Hinterrhein valley. The Chapel of S. Maria-Magdalena was built in 1508 and was initially under the monastery of Churwalden. However, in the 16th century, the hamlet of Dusch converted to the Reformation and therefore the chapel was also converted.

== Sightseeing Attractions ==
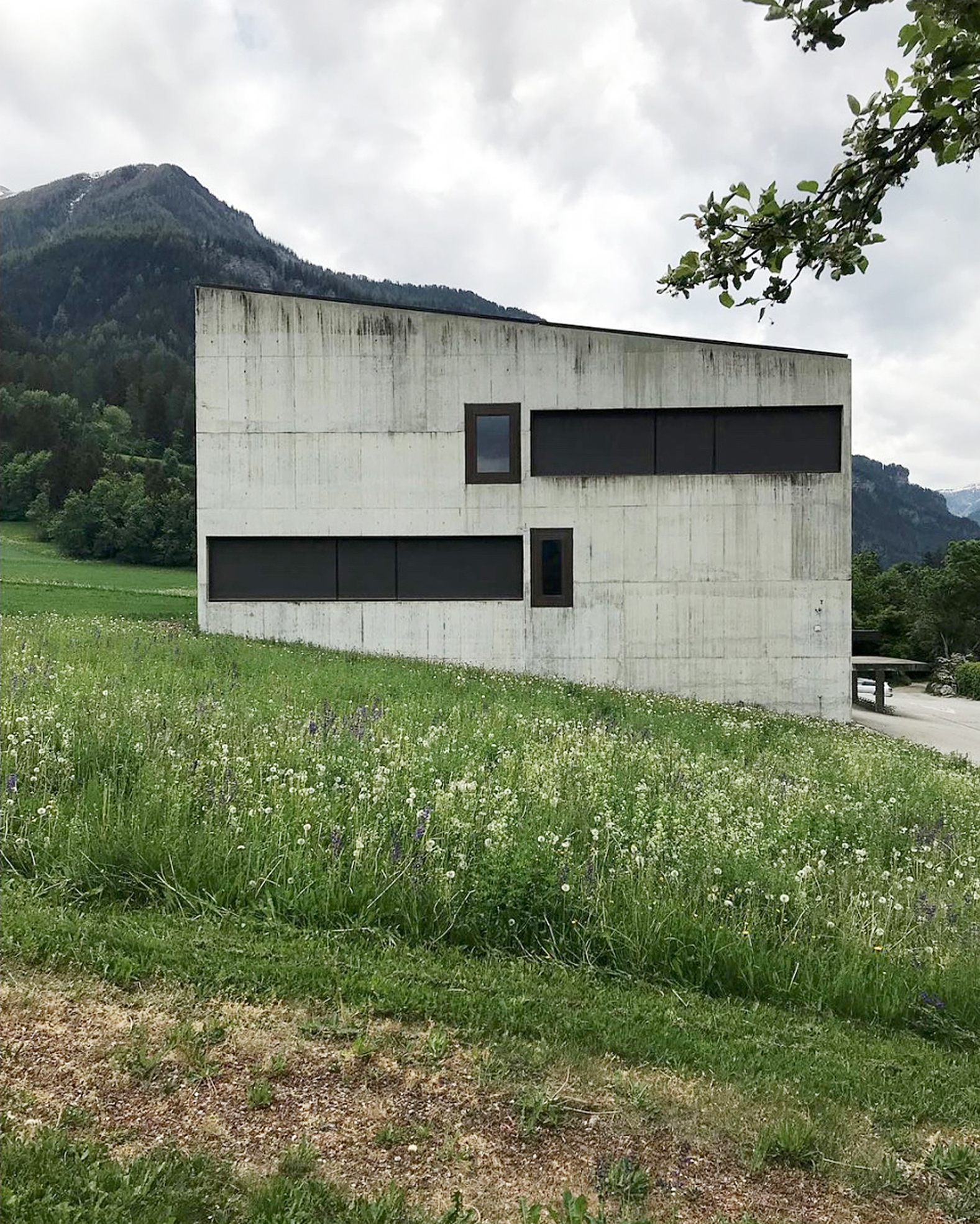
sixth form schoolhouse

- 1996–1998: sixth form schoolhouse by Valerio Olgiati and intern Raphael Zuber
