= Fürstenau, Switzerland =

Fürstenau
- Municipality
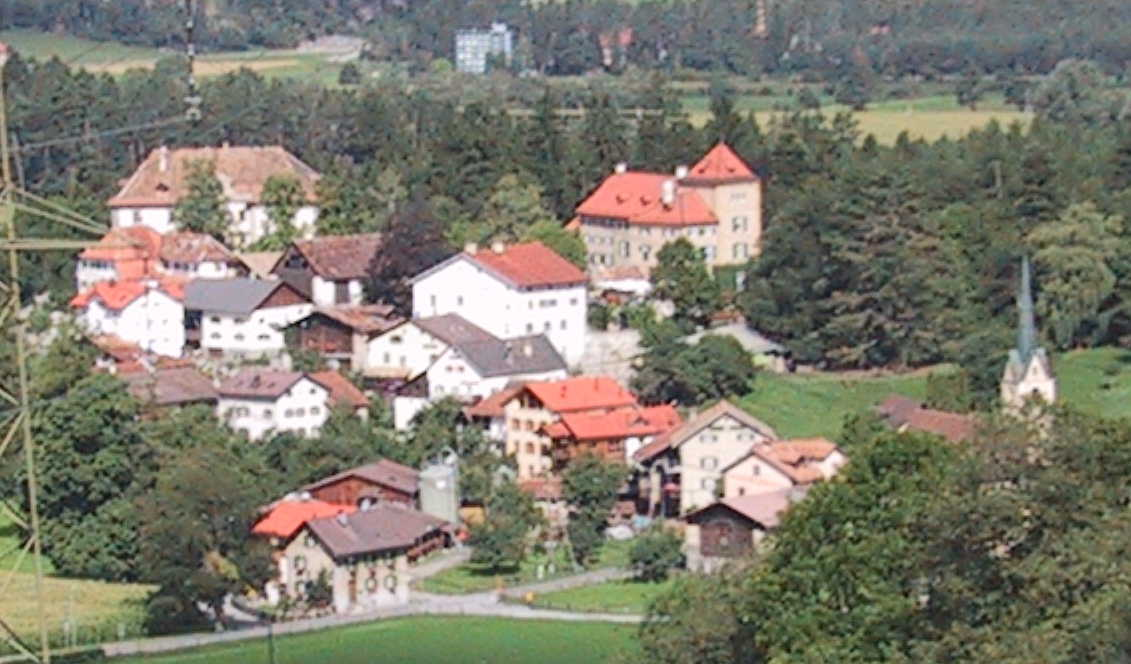

- Flag Coat of arms
- Location of Fürstenau
- Location within Switzerland Location within Canton of Grisons
- Coordinates: 46°43′15″N 9°26′49″E
- Country: Switzerland
- Canton: Grisons
- District: Viamala

Area
  - Total: 1.32 km^{2} (0.51 sq mi)
- Elevation: 650 m (2,130 ft)

Population (December 2020)
  - Total: 350
  - Density: 270/km^{2} (690/sq mi)
- Time zone: UTC+01:00 (CET)
  - Summer (DST): UTC+02:00 (CEST)
- Postal code: 7414
- SFOS number: 3633
- ISO 3166 code: CH-GR
- Surrounded by: Almens, Cazis, Pratval, Scharans, Sils im Domleschg, Thusis
- Website: fuerstenau.ch

Fürstenau (Swiss Standard German pronunciation: [ˈfʏrstənaʊ]; Romansh: Farschno) is a municipality in the Viamala Region in the Swiss canton of the Grisons and the smallest town to hold city rights with a market right received from Charles IV, Holy Roman Emperor in 1354.

== History ==
Fürstenau is first mentioned in 1257 as Fúrstenowo and Furstinowe. Originally there were two medieval tower houses or guard towers and a bishop's house in the area that became Fürstenau. The Bishop's summer residence is of course the reason for the city right.

== Geography ==
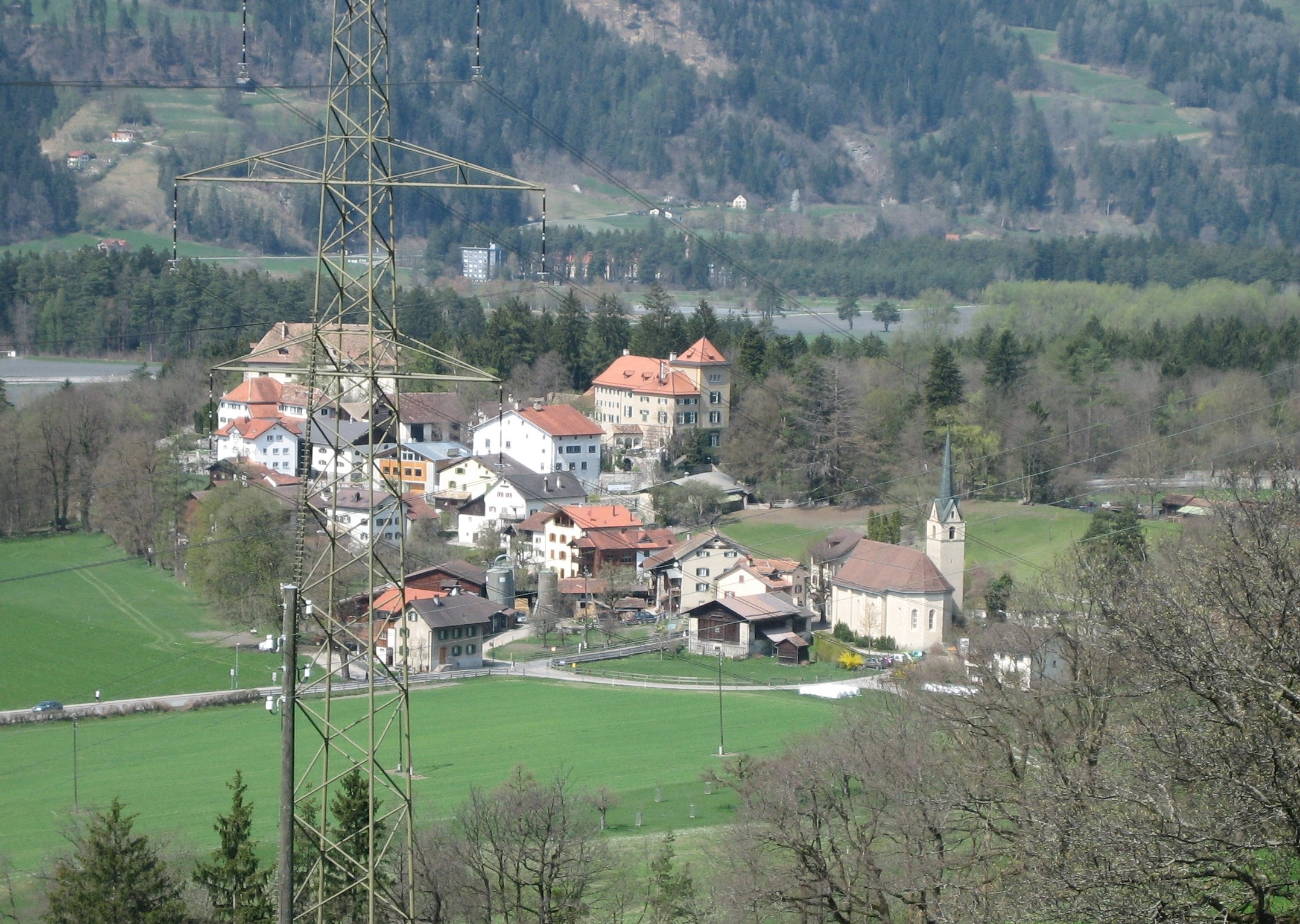
Fürstenau village and surrounding valley

Fürstenau has an area, as of 2006, of 1.3 km^{2} (0.50 sq mi). Of this area, 52.3% is used for agricultural purposes, while 32.3% is forested. Of the rest of the land, 9.2% is settled (buildings or roads) and the remainder (6.2%) is non-productive (rivers, glaciers or mountains).

Before 2017, the municipality was located in the Domleschg sub-district of the Hinterrhein district, after 2017 it was part of the Viamala Region. It consists of the village of Fürstenau and Fürstenaubruck, on the right side of the valley.

== Demographics ==
Fürstenau has a population (as of 31 December 2020) of 350. As of 2008, 8.1% of the population was made up of foreign nationals. Over the last 10 years the population has grown at a rate of 12.5%.

As of 2000, the gender distribution of the population was 49.4% male and 50.6% female. The age distribution, as of 2000, in Fürstenau is; 29 people or 9.3% of the population are between 0 and 9 years old. 16 people or 5.1% are 10 to 14, and 13 people or 4.2% are 15 to 19. Of the adult population, 27 people or 8.7% of the population are between 20 and 29 years old. 51 people or 16.4% are 30 to 39, 36 people or 11.6% are 40 to 49, and 44 people or 14.1% are 50 to 59. The senior population distribution is 25 people or 8.0% of the population are between 60 and 69 years old, 28 people or 9.0% are 70 to 79, there are 33 people or 10.6% who are 80 to 89, and there are 9 people or 2.9% who are 90 to 99.

In the 2007 federal election the most popular party was the SPS which received 32.5% of the vote. The next three most popular parties were the SVP (30.4%), the FDP (27.2%) and the CVP (9.5%).

In Fürstenau about 81% of the population (between age 25-64) have completed either non-mandatory upper secondary education or additional higher education (either university or a Fachhochschule).

Fürstenau has an unemployment rate of 1.85%. As of 2005, there were 11 people employed in the primary economic sector and about 4 businesses involved in this sector. 2 people are employed in the secondary sector and there is 1 business in this sector. 133 people are employed in the tertiary sector, with 15 businesses in this sector.

The historical population is given in the following table:

| year | population |
|---|---|
| 1803 | 107 |
| 1850 | 304 |
| 1900 | 235 |
| 1950 | 253 |
| 1980 | 198 |
| 2000 | 311 |

== Sights ==
Fürstenau has three Swiss Heritage Sites of National Significance.

=== Heritage sites of national significance ===
The Haus Stoffel, Oberes Schloss (Upper Castle) and Unteres Schloss (Lower Castle, also known as the Bishop's Castle) are listed as Swiss heritage sites of national significance. As of 2014, the Oberes Schloss is an inn with a Michelin 3-star restaurant.

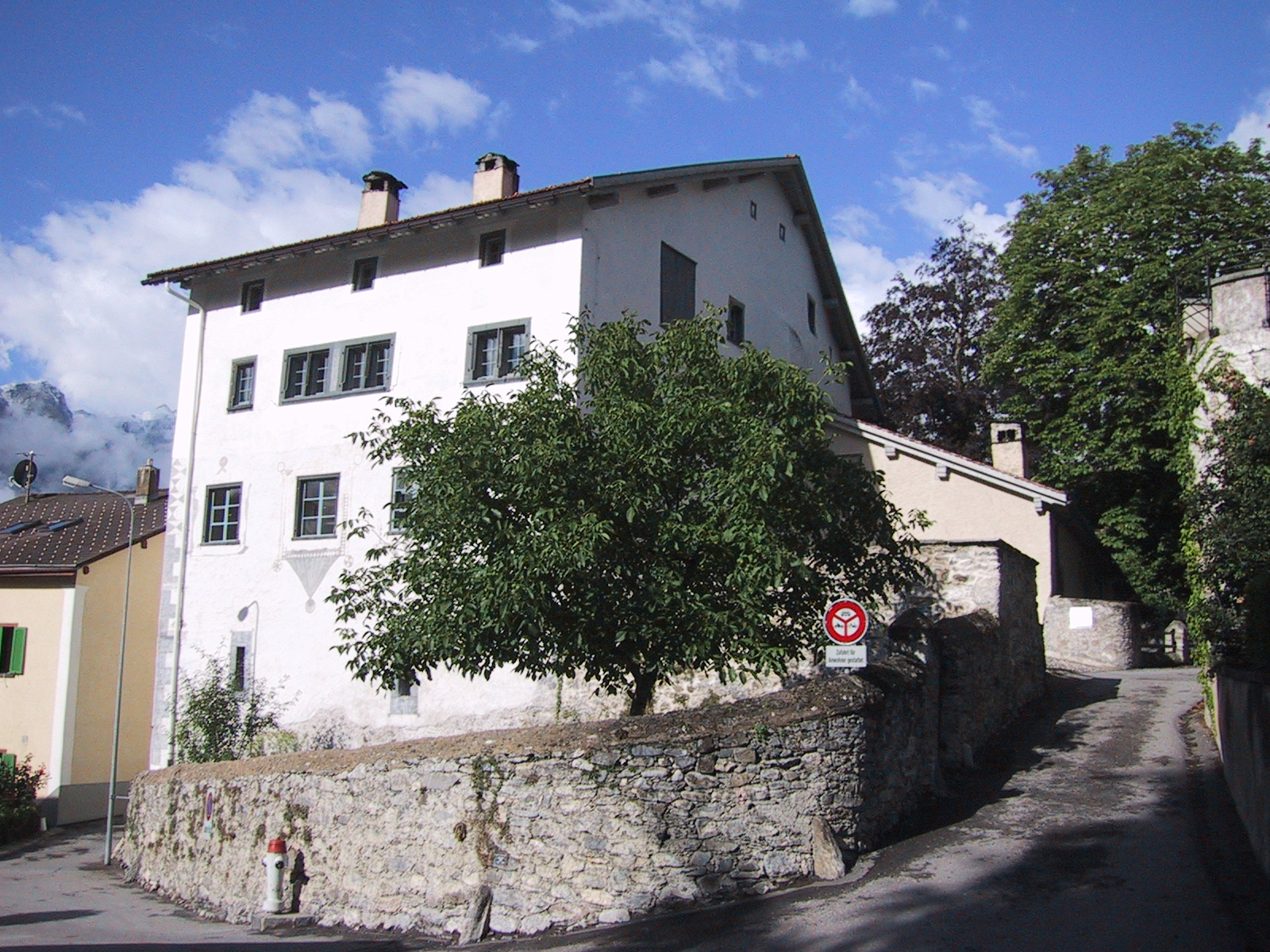
Stoffel House

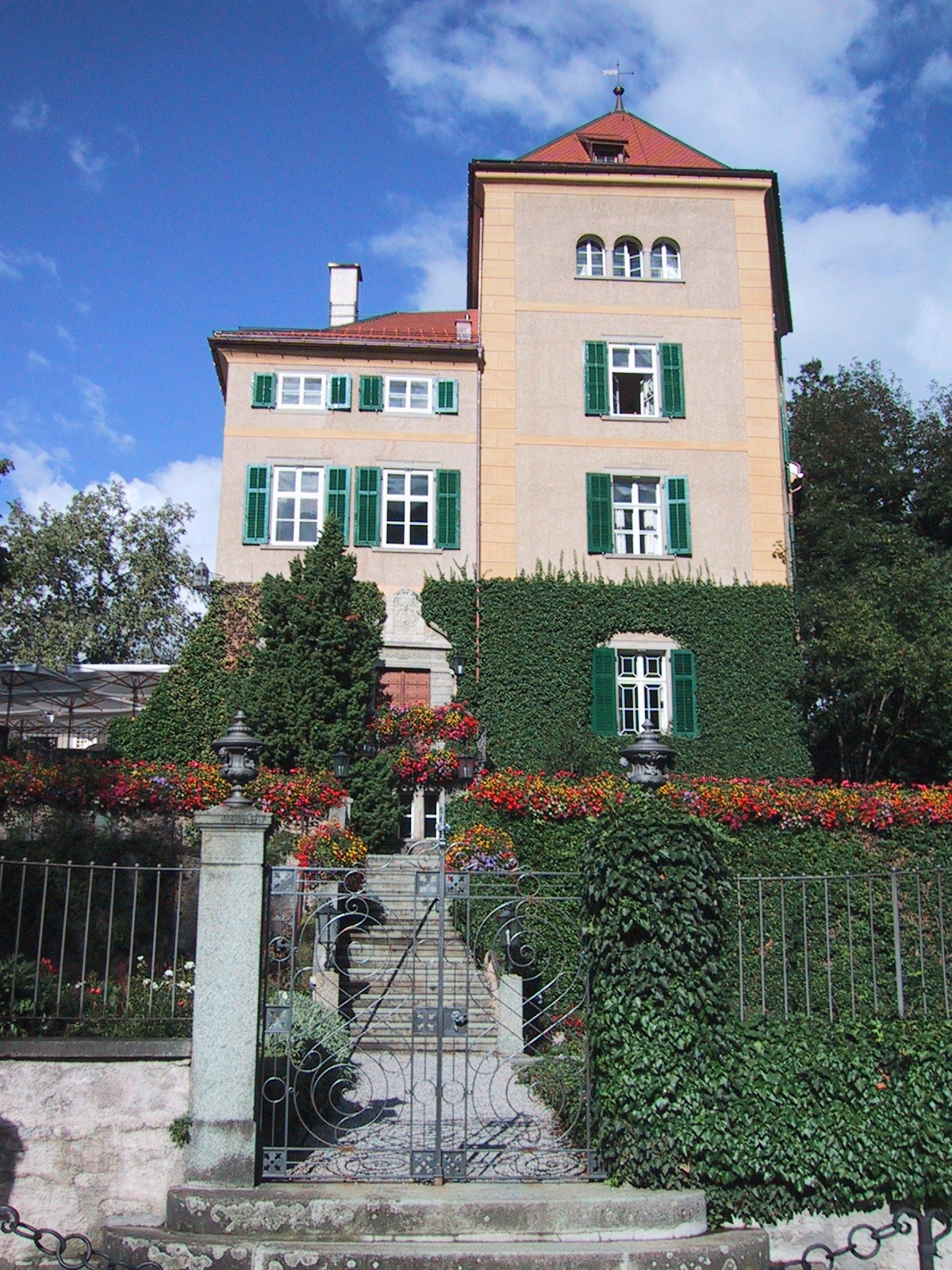
Oberes Schloss (Upper Castle)

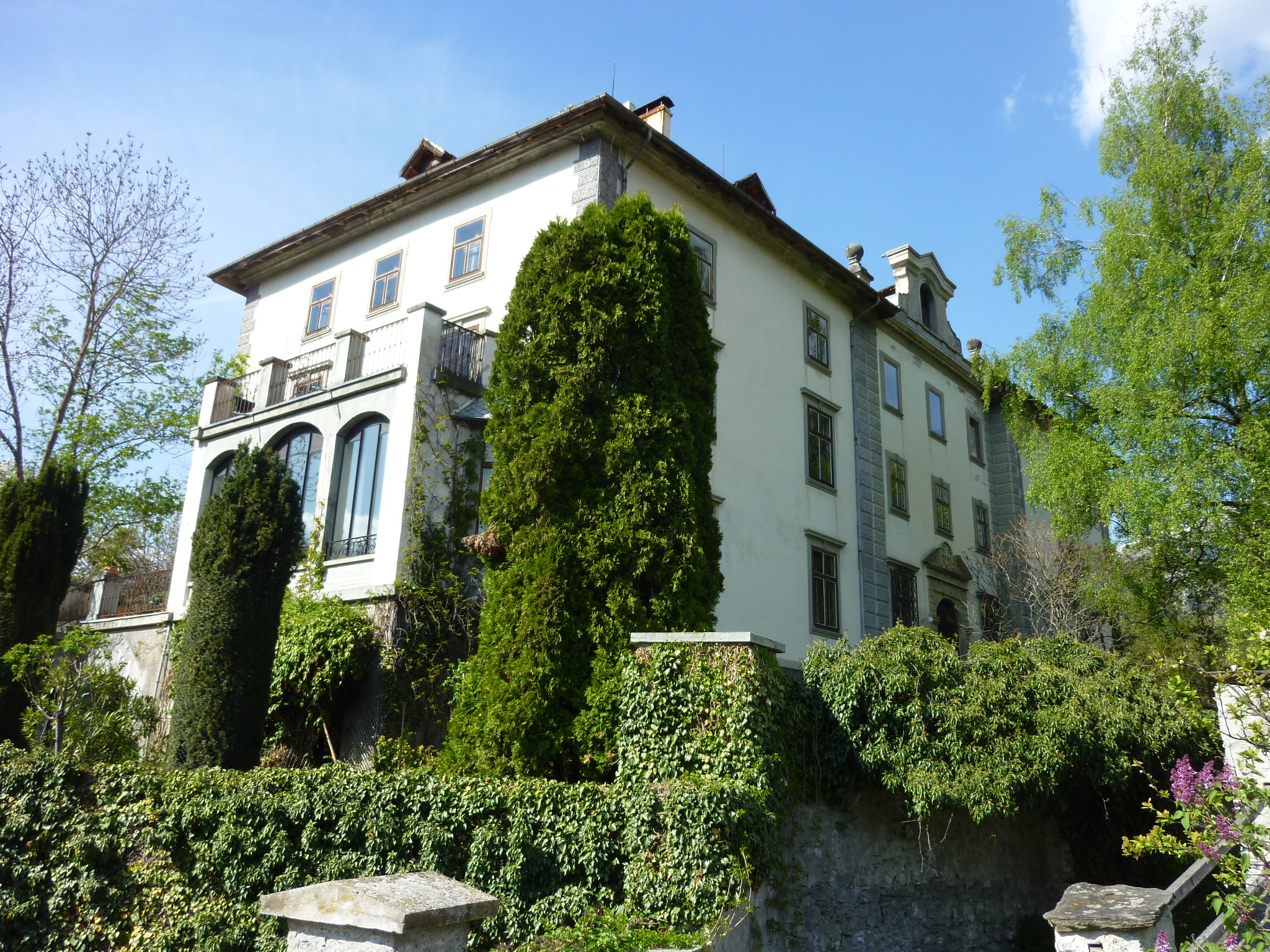
Unteres Schloss (Lower Castle)

== Languages ==
The municipality is predominantly German-speaking, with a small Romansh-speaking minority. As of 2000, 92.3% speaks German, with Romansh being second most common ( 3.2%) and Italian being third ( 1.9%).

Languages in Fürstenau
| Languages | Census 1980 | | Census 1990 | | Census 2000 | |
| Languages | Number | Percent | Number | Percent | Number | Percent |
|---|---|---|---|---|---|---|
| German | 170 | 85.86% | 243 | 89.66% | 287 | 92.28% |
| Romanish | 13 | 6.57% | 15 | 5.54% | 10 | 3.22% |
| Italian | 10 | 5.05% | 4 | 1.48% | 6 | 1.93% |
| Population | 198 | 100% | 271 | 100% | 311 | 100% |
