= Almens =

- Former municipality
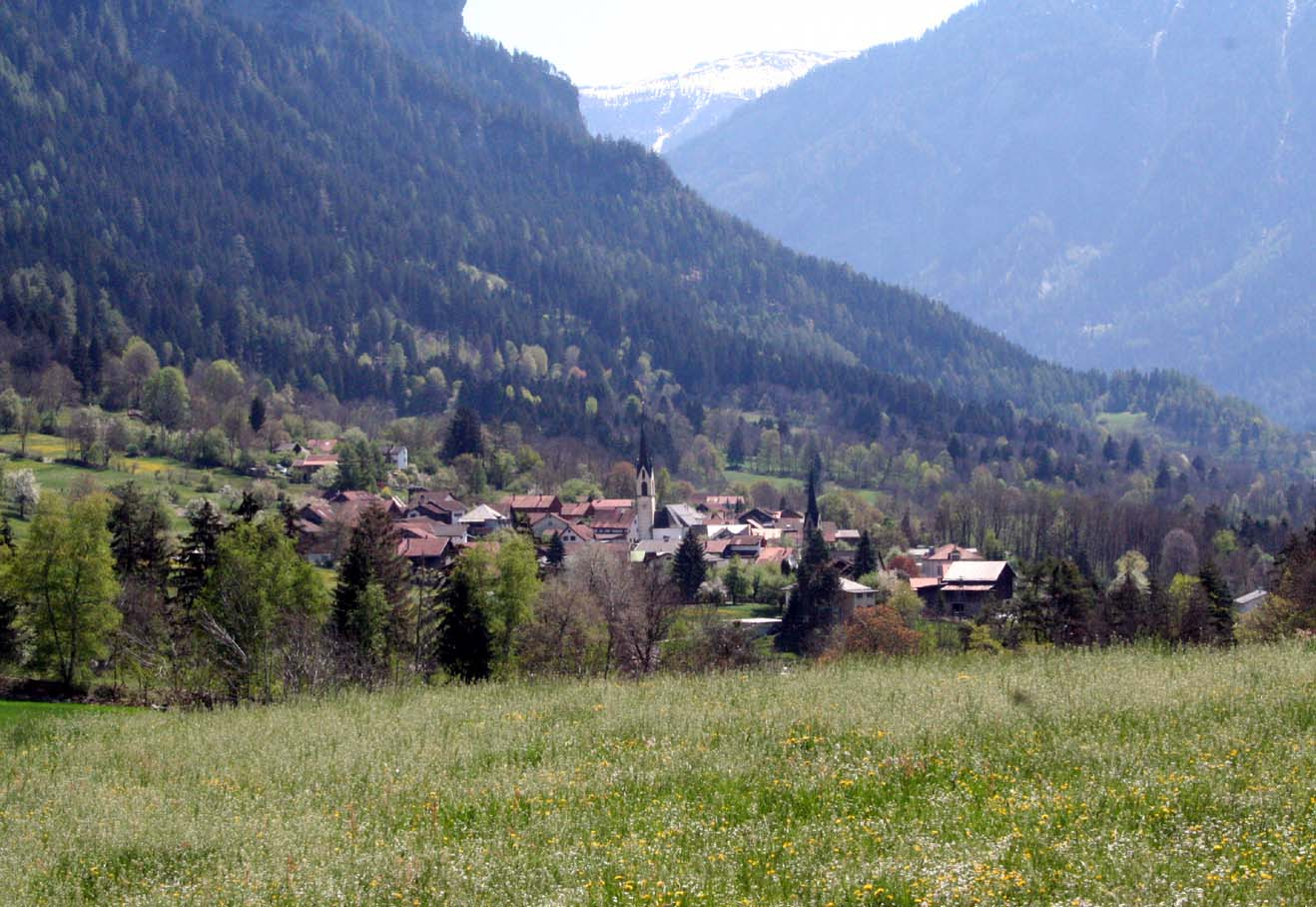

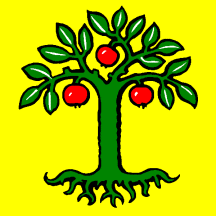
- Flag Coat of arms
- Location of Almens
- Location within Switzerland Location within Canton of Graubünden
- Coordinates: 46°44′N 9°27′E
- Country: Switzerland
- Canton: Graubünden
- District: Hinterrhein

Government
  - Mayor: Andreas Wespi

Area
  - Total: 8.34 km^{2} (3.22 sq mi)
- Elevation: 787 m (2,582 ft)

Population (Dec 2013)
  - Total: 228
  - Density: 27.3/km^{2} (70.8/sq mi)
- Time zone: UTC+01:00 (CET)
  - Summer (DST): UTC+02:00 (CEST)
- Postal code: 7416
- SFOS number: 3631
- ISO 3166 code: CH-GR
- Surrounded by: Churwalden, Fürstenau, Paspels, Pratval, Rodels, Scharans, Trans, Vaz/Obervaz
- Website: www.domleschg.ch

Almens (Romansh: Almen) is a former municipality in the district of Hinterrhein in the Swiss canton of Graubünden. On 1 January 2015 the former municipalities of Almens, Paspels, Pratval, Rodels and Tomils merged to form the new municipality of Domleschg.

== History ==
Almens is first mentioned in the first half of the 9th Century as de Lemenne.

== Geography ==
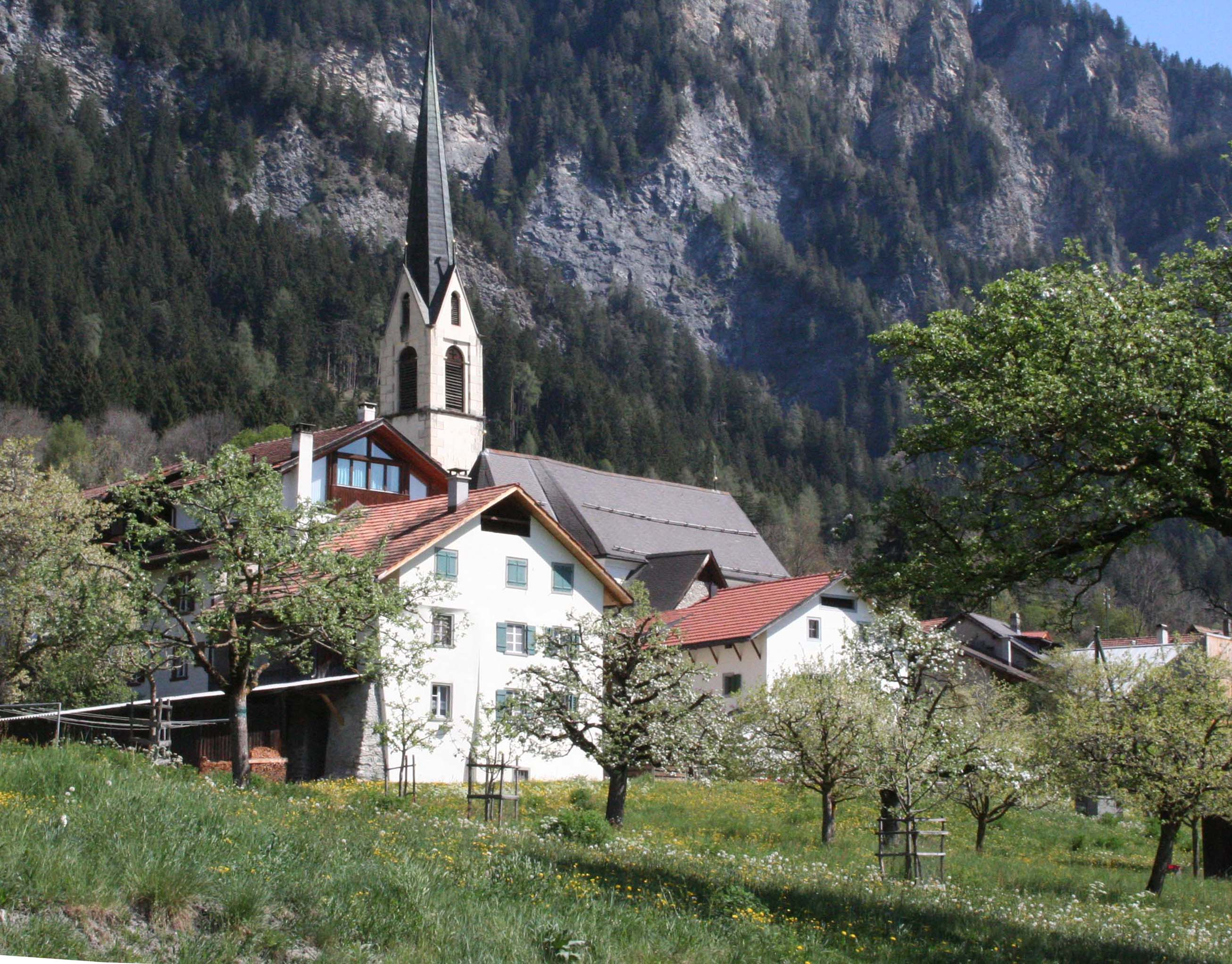
Almens

Before the merger, Almens had a total area of 8.4 km^{2} (3.2 mi^{2}). Of this area, 33.9% is used for agricultural purposes, while 45.5% is forested. Of the rest of the land, 1.7% is settled (buildings or roads) and the remainder (19%) is non-productive (rivers, glaciers or mountains).

The former municipality is located in the Domleschg sub-district of the Hinterrhein district. It is located on a high terrace above the right bank of the Hinterrhein. It consists of the village of Almens and the hamlet of Mulegns.

== Demographics ==
Almens had a population (as of 2013) of 228. As of 2007, 1.4% of the population was made up of foreign nationals. Over the last 10 years the population has grown at a rate of 5.2%.

As of 2000, the gender distribution of the population was 47.5% male and 52.5% female. The age distribution, as of 2000, in Almens is; 25 people or 11.5% of the population are between 0 and 9 years old. 10 people or 4.6% are 10 to 14, and 15 people or 6.9% are 15 to 19. Of the adult population, 18 people or 8.3% of the population are between 20 and 29 years old. 34 people or 15.7% are 30 to 39, 42 people or 19.4% are 40 to 49, and 31 people or 14.3% are 50 to 59. The senior population distribution is 10 people or 4.6% of the population are between 60 and 69 years old, 18 people or 8.3% are 70 to 79, there are 12 people or 5.5% who are 80 to 89, and there are 2 people or 0.9% who are 90 to 99.

In the 2007 federal election the most popular party was the SPS which received 38.8% of the vote. The next three most popular parties were the SVP (26.5%), the FDP (23%) and the CVP (9.5%).

In Almens, about 76.1% of the population (between age 25-64) have completed either non-mandatory upper secondary education or additional higher education (either university or a Fachhochschule).

Almens has an unemployment rate of 0.33%. As of 2005, there were 15 people employed in the primary economic sector and about 6 businesses involved in this sector. 1 person is employed in the secondary sector and there is 1 business in this sector. 11 people are employed in the tertiary sector, with 5 businesses in this sector.

The historical population is given in the following table:

year	population
1803	201
1850	226
1900	217
1950	252
1960	195
1970	133
1980	179
1990	200
2000	217
2010	215

== Languages ==
Almens used to belong to the Romansh-speaking part of Graubünden, but today it is practically completely German-speaking. As of 2000, 95.9% of the population speaks German, with Romansh being second most common ( 2.8%) and Italian being third ( 0.5%).

Languages in Almens
Language	Census of 1980		Census of 1990		Census of 2000	
Language	Number	Percentage	Number	Percentage	Number	Percentage
German	158	88.27%	185	92.50%	208	95.85%
Romansh	18	10.06%	10	5.00%	6	2.76%
Italian	3	1.68%	0	0.00%	1	0.46%
Population	179	100%	200	100%	217	100%
