= Rodels =

- Former municipality
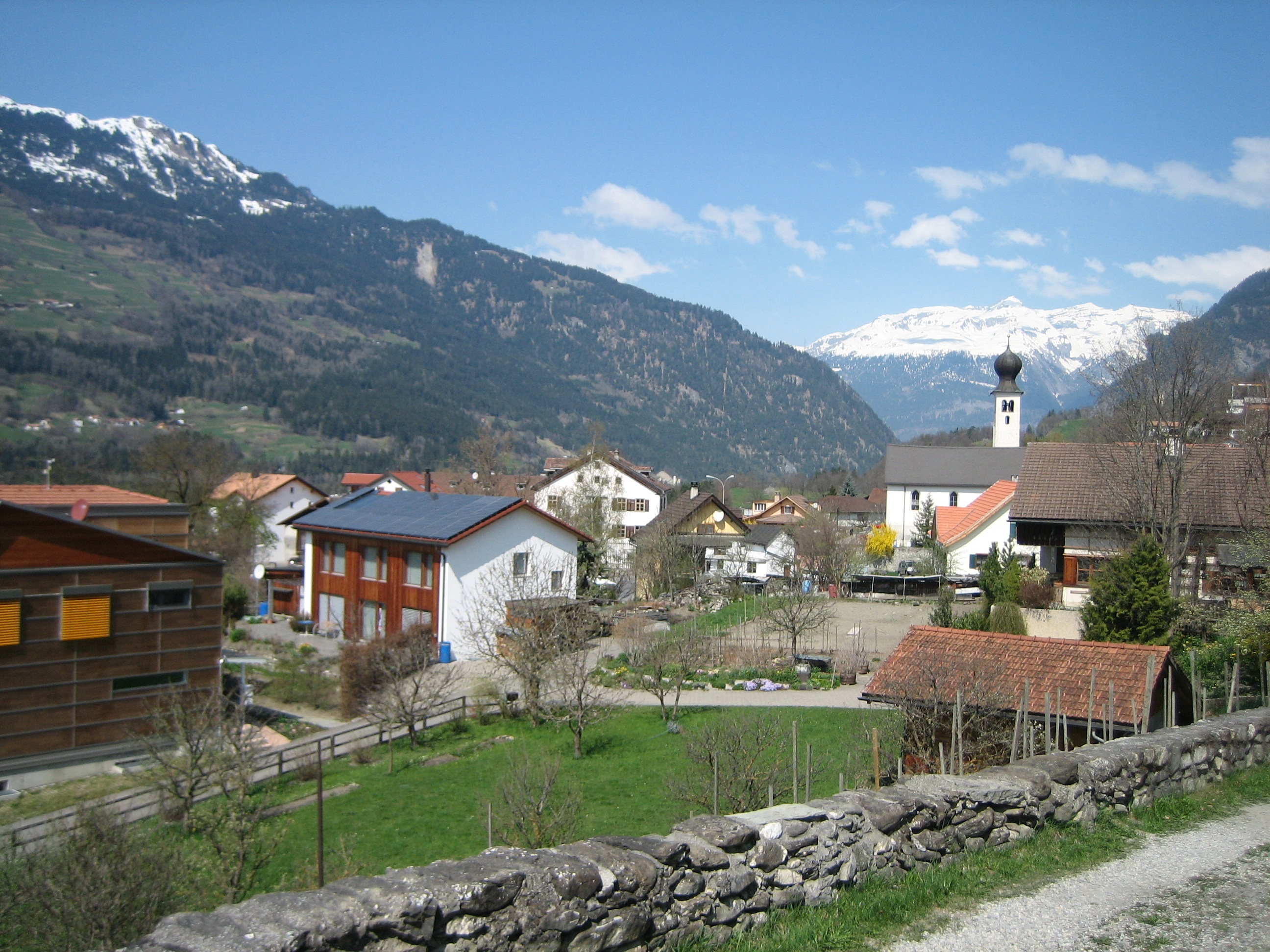

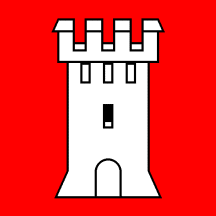
- Flag Coat of arms
- Location of Rodels
- Location within Switzerland Location within Canton of Graubünden
- Coordinates: 46°44′N 9°26′E
- Country: Switzerland
- Canton: Graubünden
- District: Hinterrhein

Area
  - Total: 1.68 km^{2} (0.65 sq mi)
- Elevation: 684 m (2,244 ft)

Population (Dec 2013)
  - Total: 267
  - Density: 159/km^{2} (412/sq mi)
- Time zone: UTC+01:00 (CET)
  - Summer (DST): UTC+02:00 (CEST)
- Postal code: 7415
- SFOS number: 3636
- ISO 3166 code: CH-GR
- Surrounded by: Almens, Cazis, Paspels, Pratval
- Website: www.domleschg.ch

Rodels (Romansh: Roten) is a former municipality in the canton of Graubünden in Switzerland, located in the district of Hinterrhein. On 1 January 2015 the former municipalities of Almens, Paspels, Pratval, Rodels and Tomils merged to form the new municipality of Domleschg.

== History ==
Rodels is first mentioned in the mid-12th Century as ad Rautine.

== Geography ==
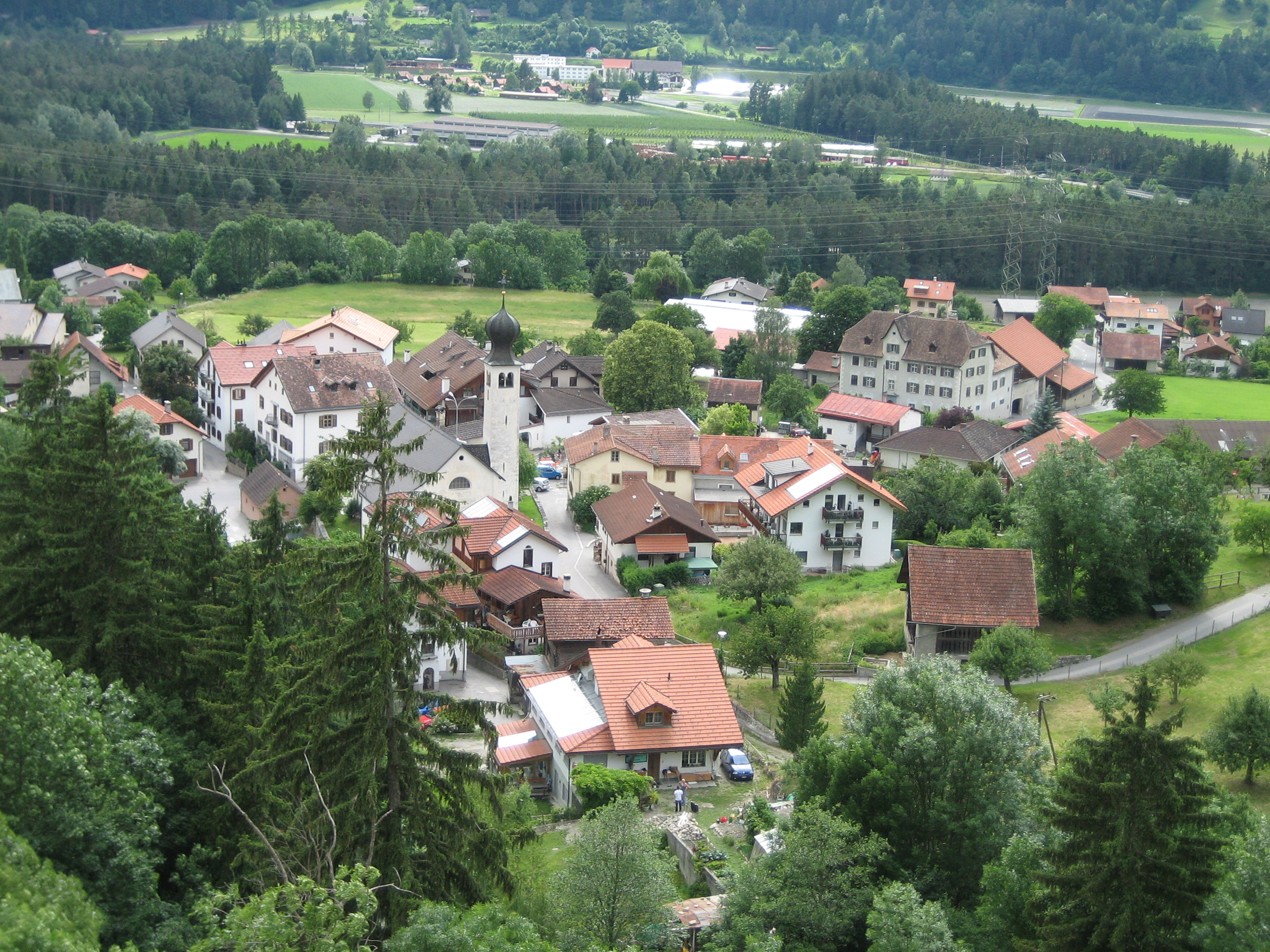
Rodels from the north

Before the merger, Rodels had a total area of 1.7 km^{2} (0.66 mi^{2}). Of this area, 52.4% is used for agricultural purposes, while 31.5% is forested. Of the rest of the land, 11.3% is settled (buildings or roads) and the remainder (4.8%) is non-productive (rivers, glaciers or mountains).

The former municipality is located in the Domleschg sub-district, of the Hinterrhein district. It consists of a linear village and a haufendorf (an irregular, unplanned and quite closely packed village, built around a central square) as well as the hamlet of Nueins. The municipality is located on a low terrace on the right side of the Hinterrhein.

== Demographics ==
Rodels had a population (as of 2013) of 267. As of 2013, 7.9% of the population was made up of foreign nationals. Between 2000 and 2010, the population number was stable. Between 2010 and 2013, the population has declined by 5%.

As of 2000, the gender distribution of the population was 50.8% male and 49.2% female. The age distribution, as of 2000, in Rodels is; 35 people or 12.5% of the population are between 0 and 9 years old. 27 people or 9.6% are 10 to 14, and 17 people or 6.0% are 15 to 19. Of the adult population, 34 people or 12.1% of the population are between 20 and 29 years old. 52 people or 18.5% are 30 to 39, 46 people or 16.4% are 40 to 49, and 28 people or 10.0% are 50 to 59. The senior population distribution is 18 people or 6.4% of the population are between 60 and 69 years old, 16 people or 5.7% are 70 to 79, there are 7 people or 2.5% who are 80 to 89, and there are 1 people or 0.4% who are 90 to 99.

In the 2011 federal election the most popular party was the SVP which received 23.6% of the vote. The next three most popular parties were the BDP (22.1%), SPS (17.8%) and the CVP (15.5%).

In Rodels 80% of the population (between age 25-64) have completed either non-mandatory upper secondary education or additional higher education (either university or a Fachhochschule).

As of 2011, Rodels had an unemployment rate of 1.05%. As of 2008, there were 20 people employed in the primary economic sector and about 8 businesses involved in this sector. 6 people are employed in the secondary sector. 23 people are employed in the tertiary sector, with 15 businesses in this sector.

The historical population is given in the following table:

year	population
1803	106
1850	135
1900	147
1950	178
1980	155
2000	281

== Languages ==
Most of the population (as of 2000) speaks German (90.7%), with Romansh being second most common (3.9%) and Italian being third (1.8%).

Languages in Rodels
Languages	Census 1980		Census 1990		Census 2000	
Languages	Number	Percent	Number	Percent	Number	Percent
German	125	80.65%	204	91.89%	255	90.75%
Romanish	25	16.13%	10	4.50%	11	3.91%
Italian	5	3.23%	5	2.25%	5	1.78%
Population	155	100%	222	100%	281	100%

== Transportation ==
Rhaetian Railway operate services to Rodels-Realta (Rhaetian Railway station) nearby.
