= Municipalities of the canton of the Grisons =

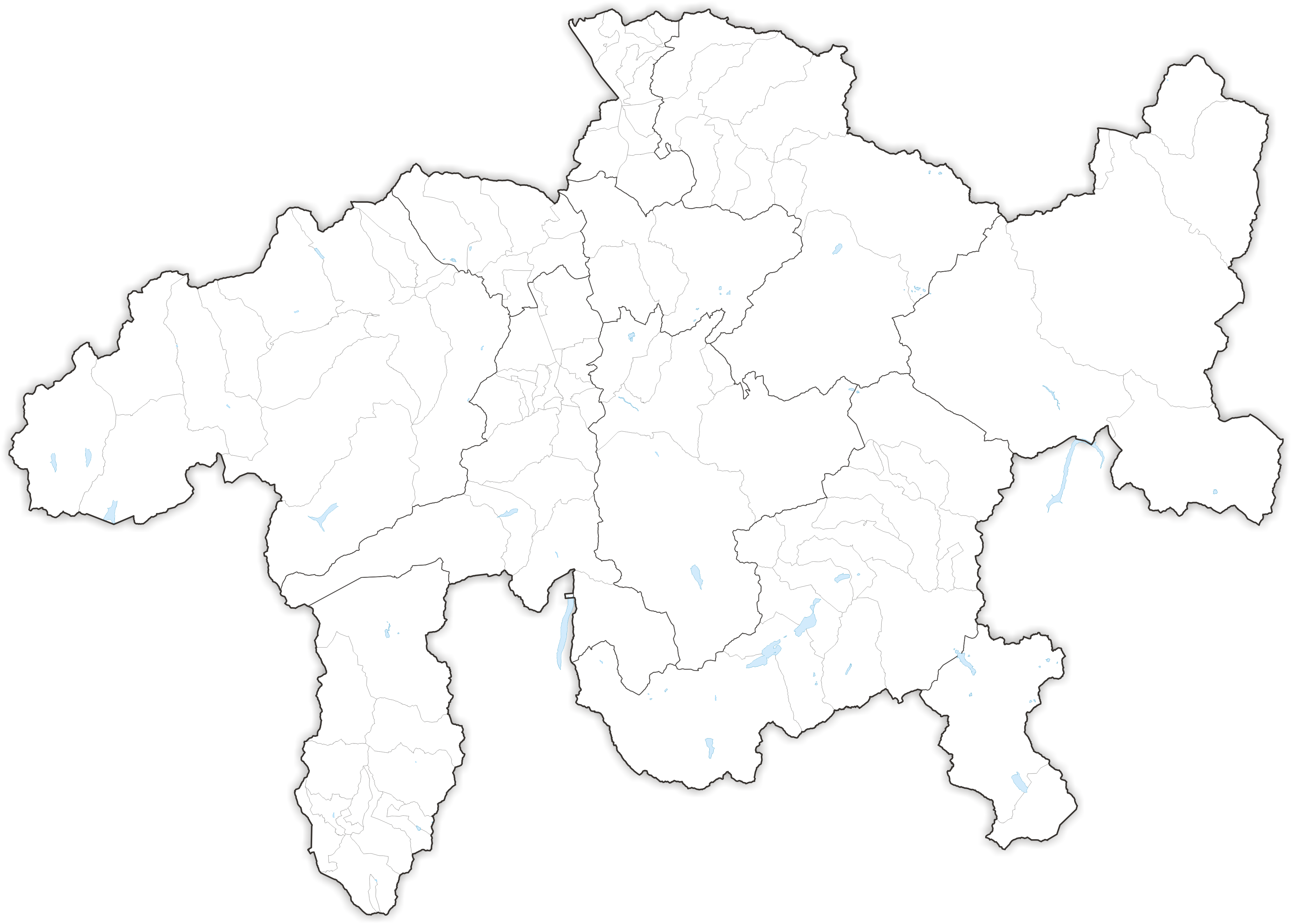
Municipalities in the canton of the Grisons

There are 100 municipalities in the canton of the Grisons, Switzerland (as of January 2025).

== List ==
- Albula/Alvra
- Andeer
- Arosa
- Avers
- Bergün Filisur
- Bever
- Bonaduz
- Bregaglia
- Breil/Brigels
- Brusio
- Buseno
- Calanca
- Cama
- Castaneda
- Cazis
- Celerina/Schlarigna
- Chur
- Churwalden
- Conters im Prättigau
- Davos
- Disentis/Mustér
- Domat/Ems
- Domleschg
- Falera
- Felsberg
- Ferrera
- Fideris
- Fläsch
- Flerden
- Flims
- Furna
- Fürstenau
- Grono
- Grüsch
- Ilanz/Glion
- Jenaz
- Jenins
- Klosters-Serneus
- Küblis
- La Punt Chamues-ch
- Laax
- Landquart
- Lantsch/Lenz
- Lostallo
- Lumnezia
- Luzein
- Madulain
- Maienfeld
- Malans
- Masein
- Medel (Lucmagn)
- Mesocco
- Muntogna da Schons
- Obersaxen Mundaun
- Pontresina
- Poschiavo
- Rhäzüns
- Rheinwald
- Rongellen
- Rossa
- Rothenbrunnen
- Roveredo
- S-chanf
- Safiental
- Sagogn
- Samedan
- Samnaun
- San Vittore
- Santa Maria in Calanca
- Scharans
- Schiers
- Schluein
- Schmitten
- Scuol
- Seewis im Prättigau
- Sils im Domleschg
- Sils im Engadin/Segl
- Silvaplana
- Soazza
- St. Moritz
- Sufers
- Sumvitg
- Surses
- Tamins
- Thusis
- Trimmis
- Trin
- Trun
- Tschappina
- Tujetsch
- Untervaz
- Urmein
- Val Müstair
- Vals
- Valsot
- Vaz/Obervaz
- Zernez
- Zillis-Reischen
- Zizers
- Zuoz

== Mergers ==
January 1, 2002
Camuns, Surcasti, Tersnaus and Uors-Peiden merged to form the municipality of Suraua.
January 1, 2003
Donath and Patzen-Fardün merged to form Donat. The place name "Donath" is changed to "Donat", "Patzen" to "Pazen" and "Fardün" to "Farden".
January 1, 2006
Medels im Rheinwald and Splügen merged to form Splügen.
January 1, 2007
St. Antönien and St. Antönien Ascharina merged to form St. Antönien.
January 1, 2008
Ausserferrera and Innerferrera merged to form Ferrera.
St. Peter GR and Pagig merged to form St. Peter-Pagig.
Says and Trimmis merged to form Trimmis.
January 1, 2009
Wiesen and Davos merged to form Davos.
Feldis/Veulden, Scheid, Trans and Tumegl/Tomils merged to form Tomils.
Tschierv, Fuldera, Lü, Valchava, Santa Maria Val Müstair and Müstair merged to form Val Müstair.
Flond and Surcuolm merged to form Mundaun.
Tschiertschen and Praden merged to form Tschiertschen-Praden.
Andeer, Clugin and Pignia merged to form Andeer.
January 1, 2010
Bondo, Castasegna, Soglio, Stampa and Vicosoprano merged to form Bregaglia.
Cazis, Portein, Präz, Sarn and Tartar merged to form Cazis.
Parpan, Malix and Churwalden merged to form Churwalden.
January 1, 2012
Igis and Mastrils merged to form Landquart.
January 1, 2013
Ramosch and Tschlin merged to form Valsot.
Valendas, Versam, Safien and Tenna merged to form Safiental.
Arosa, Calfreisen, Castiel, Lüen, St. Peter-Pagig, Langwies, Molinis and Peist merged to form Arosa
Cumbel, Degen, Lumbrein, Morissen, Suraua, Vignogn, Vella and Vrin merged to form Lumnezia.
January 1, 2014
Castrisch, Duvin, Ilanz, Ladir, Luven, Pigniu, Pitasch, Riein, Rueun, Ruschein, Schnaus, Sevgein and Siat merged to form Ilanz/Glion
January 1, 2015
Alvaneu, Alvaschein, Brienz/Brinzauls, Mon, Switzerland, Surava, Stierva and Tiefencastel merged to form Albula/Alvra.
St. Martin and Vals merged to form Vals.
Almens, Paspels, Pratval, Rodels and Tomils merged to form Domleschg.
Ardez, Ftan, Guarda, Scuol, Sent and Tarasp merged to form Scuol.
Lavin, Susch and Zernez merged to form Zernez.
Arvigo, Braggio, Cauco and Selma merged to form Calanca.
January 1, 2016
Bivio, Cunter, Marmorera, Mulegns, Riom-Parsonz, Salouf, Savognin, Sur and Tinizong-Rona merged to form Surses.
Mundaun and Obersaxen merged to form Obersaxen Mundaun.
Klosters-Serneus and Saas im Prättigau merged to form Klosters-Serneus.
Luzein and St. Antönien merged to form Luzein.
January 1, 2017
Grono, Leggia and Verdabbio merged to form Grono.

January 1, 2018
Mutten and Thusis merged to form Thusis.
Bergün and Filisur merged to form Bergün Filisur.
Andiast, Breil/Brigels and Waltensburg/Vuorz merged to form Breil/Brigels.

January 1, 2019
Hinterrhein, Nufenen and Splügen merged to form Rheinwald

January 1, 2020
Chur and Maladers merged to form Chur

January 1, 2021
Casti-Wergenstein, Donat, Lohn and Mathon merged to form Muntogna da Schons
Chur and Haldenstein merged to form Chur

January 1, 2025
Chur and Tschiertschen-Praden merged to form Chur
