= Greti Caprez-Roffler =

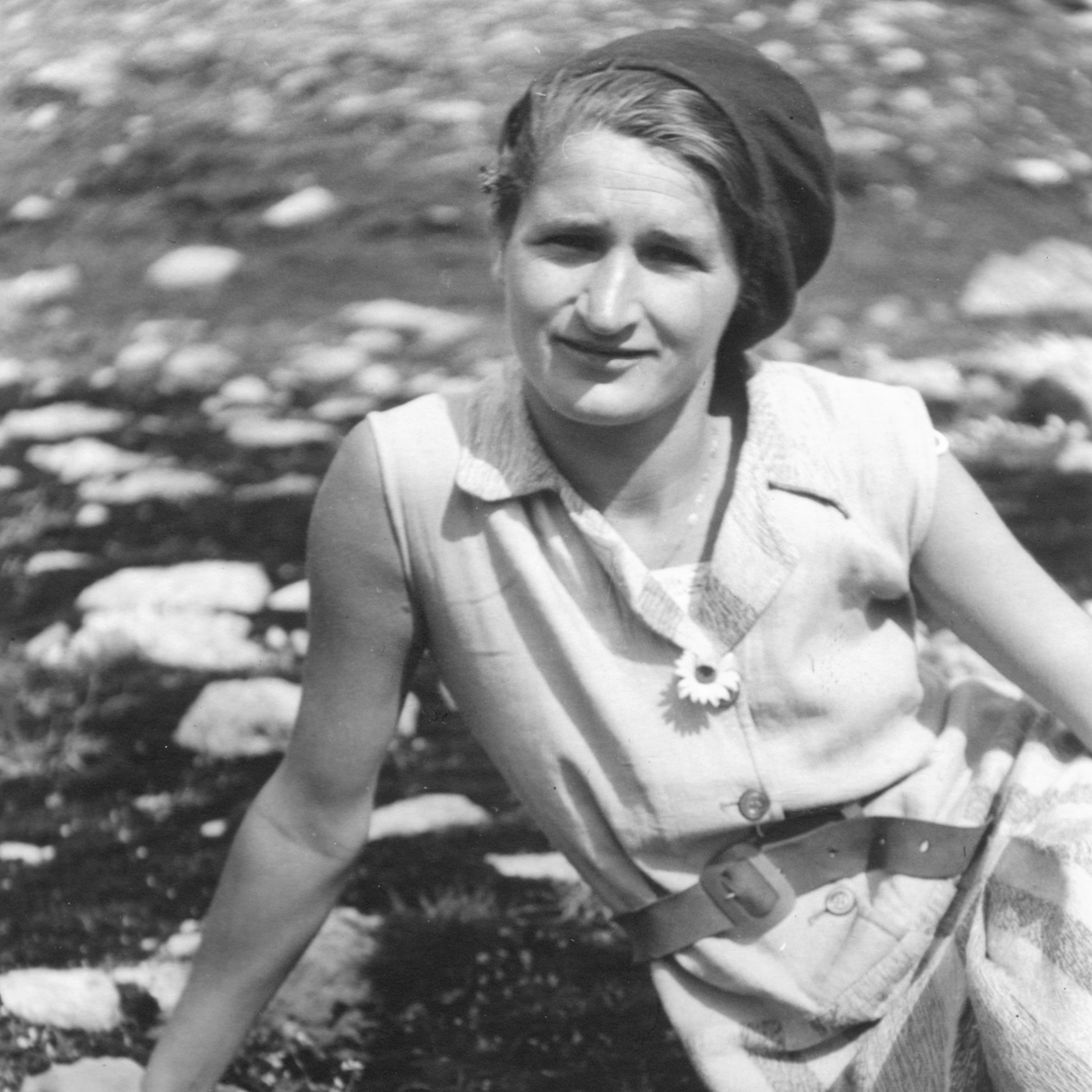
- Caprez-Roffler in 1931
- Born: Margreth Roffler; 17 August 1906; St. Antönien, Grisons, Switzerland
- Died: 19 March 1994 (aged 87); Chur, Grisons, Switzerland
- Spouse: Gian Caprez

Margreth "Greti" Caprez-Roffler (17 August 1906 in St. Antönien, Grisons - 19 March 1994 in Chur) was a Swiss reformed pastor. She was elected in 1931, with the reformed Furna in Pättigau ignoring the law in force at the time which barred women from the role, making her the first female pastor to be solely responsible for a congregation in Switzerland.

== Life and career ==
Margreth's parents, called Greti Roffler, were Josias Roffler (1878–1944), a mountain farmer's son from Furna, and Elsbeth Luk from neighboring Jenaz, daughter of the registrar (Canton accountant). Josiah had previously been a Reformed pastor in Fideris, and taught at the Bündner Kantonsschule. Beginning in 1912 he was a pastor in Igis, to which Landquart belonged. Until 1927 he also served simultaneously in Zizers. From 1929 to 1932 he was a member of the church council of the Reformed Regional Church, and from 1932 to 1943 he again served as a pastor, this time in Felsberg.

According to her daughter Margreth Härdi-Caprez, Greti Roffler was very dependent on her father. After graduating from high school in Chur, she began studying classical philology at the University of Zurich in 1925, but soon switched to Theology. In 1928 she went to Philipps University of Marburg for a semester. In the same year, her father got the Graubünden Synod and the parish office to speak out in favor of unmarried women holding ministerial roles in the church. The necessary change to the church constitution was postponed by the Evangelical Grand Council, especially since Greti Roffler was the only potential candidate for the pastorate in 1929.

Against the resistance of her parents and in-laws, she married Gian Caprez (1905–1994), a civil engineer for ETH, and emigrated with him to São Paulo. Greti Caprez-Roffler returned home after a year to take the state examination in Zurich and to give birth to her first child. Her father ensured that she was the first woman to be admitted to the theological exams in Graubünden. Against the background of collapsing coffee prices and coupmilitary forces, her husband also left Brazil in 1931. The two lived temporarily in Pontresina, where her father-in-law owned a construction business. Caprez-Roffler fought for the admission of women to the pastorate with articles in the Graubünden press.

=== The shame of being a woman ===
In 1918, the Reformed Grisons introduced women's suffrage in church matters. In Zurich in the same year, Rosa Gutknecht and Elise Pfister were the first female theologians to become Verbi divini ministrae ordained - they were to remain the only ones until 1963. Except in the Église évangélique libre of the Canton of Vaud, only the office of parish assistant was open to women. If they were able to temporarily take on a pastorate, they had to give it up when they got married.

Nevertheless, on September 13, 1931, the married Greti Caprez-Roffler was elected pastor by her father's home community at his suggestion. Previously, Furna, located at an altitude of 1,350 meters, whose population of just over 200 had to wait until 1968 for a connection to the power grid, had unsuccessfully sought a successor to its pastor who had been appointed to Milan. Greti Caprez-Roffler writes about what followed:

A storm broke out! Not only in the church council, in the synod, in the entire "leaf forest" of Graubünden and beyond the borders of the canton.

— Greti Caprez-Roffler, Die Pfarrerin, Lebenserinnerungen der ersten Bündner Theologin

Although the Evangelical Small Council declared the election invalid and the 25-year-old had great self-doubts, she moved to Prättigau with her 9-month-old son and a housekeeper. Her husband was living in Zurich for professional reasons at the time, but was soon able to do most of his work as an engineer in Furna. The community invoked the Canton Constitution, which gave them the right to choose their pastor, and decided the authorities:

If our pastor has no other fault than that he wears a coat, we keep it.

The piquant thing about it: Greti Caprez-Roffler used to wear ski pants in winter and also allowed the girls to do so, while her main opponent, Pastor Jakob Rudolf Truog in Jenaz, forbade them to wear pants. When the Evangelical Small Council of the recalcitrant community blocked the trust assets in 1932, Greti Caprez-Roffler wrote in her diary:

I may have suspected it before, but never had to experience it with such cruel clarity: that it is a disgrace, a To be a woman.

On top of everything else, in the same year the Reformed women voters stabbed her in the back by, together with the men, denying even unmarried women access to the parish office. For a while, Caprez-Roffler kept her job for God's money, but then moved to Zurich to live with her husband in 1934. He had started a second degree in theology the previous year. Although he was not very enthusiastic about it, his father kept them both afloat during the Great Depression. Furna found a man again as a pastor.

Through one of her theological teachers, Emil Brunner, she came into contact with the Oxford group of Frank Buchman in Zurich around 1935, who were striving for a spiritual departure. Bible reading, personal prayer and mutual confession of sins were practiced in groups, the so-called house parties. At a joint conference in 1936 at the Bürgenstock, she also came to the realization that she needed such a conversion, which led to a more intimate relationship with God.

=== Ongoing discrimination ===
In 1938 Gian Caprez was elected pastor of Flerden, Urmein and Tschappina at Heinzenberg. Since he only completed his studies later in the year mentioned, his wife represented him until then. After that, however, she was only allowed to preach in the last two places mentioned. The Colloquium Nid dem Wald invited her to its meetings, but without voting rights because she was not a member of the synod. When a retired priest from another colloquium moved into the area, he was indignant at their presence, saying "It's a good thing I came and took the lid off that stinking pot".

During this time of threat from Nazi Germany, Greti Caprez-Roffler gave field sermons to soldiers.

In 1941, the Evangelical Small Council asked the couple whether they would like to jointly take over the newly created pastorate at the cantonal institutions (hospitals, prisons) in Chur and Realta. While Gian received the salary of a country priest, Greti, as his helper, was only paid to the extent that she could afford a housekeeper. She was also only allowed to perform the sacraments on a temporary basis. donate. Nevertheless, they accepted the offer and bought a house in Chur. But when the housekeeper became deaconess and the now five (soon later six) children were giving too much work, Greti Caprez-Roffler resigned in 1945, whereupon she was replaced by another woman.

In 1947 her husband successfully applied for one of the two pastoral positions in Kilchberg near Zurich. There, his counterpart Eduard Schweingruber, who had written a book on Frauenart that has been published several times, caused them difficulties. Greti Caprez-Roffler writes:

He wasn't against the theologian per se, but against those in his community. (…) He even refused to allow me to prepare Sunday school teachers (…) I never thought it would be like that for me could become difficult - like a burning fire - not being allowed to preach.

She therefore accepted preaching assignments far beyond the canton of Zurich. In the canton of Thurgau, the government council forbade her to baptize one of her grandchildren.

=== Finally equal ===
In 1963, the canton of Zurich introduced ecclesiastical women's suffrage, and in the same year Greti Caprez-Roffler - 33 years after the state examination - was elected with eleven other graduates of the theological faculty in Zurich Grossmünster ordained.

In 1965, the Protestant electorate in Graubünden admitted women to the pastorate, as did all Reformed cantonal churches between 1956 and 1968. Gian Caprez then gave up his job in Kilchberg four years before retirement for his wife's sake. In 1966 the couple took over pastoral care in Rheinwald, which had been without a pastor for a long time: he in Splügen, Sufers and Medels, she in Nufenen and Hinterrhein. The problem became that pastors live in the respective rectory, but married couples had to have a common residence according to ZGB. After the Synod welcomed Yvette Mayer (1926–2001) into its ranks in 1965 as the first properly elected pastor, it now also did the same with Greti Caprez-Roffler. The church council reluctantly allowed her husband and she to take turns in the pulpits every Sunday.

In 1967 her daughter Margreth Härdi-Caprez was ordained in Zofingen. Greti Caprez-Roffler could have retired in 1970. But since Furna was once again unable to find a pastor, she and her husband took over the position there again for two years. They chose their grandfather's house as their retirement home. In 1982, their eldest Gian, founder of an engineering company, fell victim to an avalanche accident. In 1983 she received honorary citizenship of Furna. From that year on, the last Graubünden women were finally allowed to have a say in municipal matters, as they had done since 1971 in federal and 1972 in cantonal matters. In 1987 the couple moved to a retirement home in Chur. In 1994 they died 24 days apart, first Greti, then Gian.

== Works ==
- Caprez-Roffler, Greti (1931). "The cause of women theologians in the Swiss cantons". Notices from the Association of Protestant Women Theologians in Germany. 1 (3): 9–12.
- Caprez-Roffler, Greti (1980). "The pastor, memoirs of the first Graubünden theologian". Bündner Jahrbuch. 22. New episode: 110–133.
- Caprez-Roffler, Greti (1981). "The pastor, memoirs of the first Graubünden theologian". Bündner Jahrbuch. 23. New episode: 94–112.
- Caprez-Roffler, Greti (1981). The pastor, memoirs of the first Graubünden theologian. Chur: Bischofberger.
