= Viamala Region =

Coordinates: 46.66°N 9.45°E

Viamala Region Region Viamala (German) Regiun Viamala (Romansh)
- District
- Country: Switzerland
- Canton: Graubünden

Area
  - Total: 627.58 km^{2} (242.31 sq mi)

Population (2020)
  - Total: 13,908
  - Density: 22.161/km^{2} (57.398/sq mi)
- Time zone: UTC+1 (CET)
  - Summer (DST): UTC+2 (CEST)
- Municipalities: 19

Viamala Region is one of the eleven regions of the canton of Graubünden in Switzerland. It has an area of 627.58 square kilometers (242.31 sq mi) and a population of 13,908 (as of 31 December 2020). It was created on 1 January 2017 as part of a reorganization of the Canton.

Municipalities in the Viamala Region
| Municipality | Population (31 December 2020) | Area (km^{2}) |
|---|---|---|
| Fürstenau | 350 | 1.32 |
| Rothenbrunnen | 304 | 3.11 |
| Scharans | 796 | 14.29 |
| Sils im Domleschg | 971 | 9.28 |
| Cazis | 2,287 | 31.18 |
| Flerden | 247 | 6.09 |
| Masein | 500 | 4.2 |
| Thusis | 9,453 | 6.81 |
| Tschappina | 134 | 24.67 |
| Urmein | 150 | 4.33 |
| Domleschg | 2,160 | 45.94 |
| Avers | 164 | 93.12 |
| Rheinwald | 574 | 136.82 |
| Sufers | 146 | 34.62 |
| Andeer | 916 | 46.3 |
| Muntogna da Schons | 360 | |
| Rongellen | 56 | 2.02 |
| Zillis-Reischen | 389 | 24.47 |
| Ferrera | 79 | 75.46 |

== Mergers ==
- On 1 January 2018, the former municipality of Mutten merged into the municipality of Thusis.
- On 1 January 2019, the former municipalities of Hinterrhein, Nufenen and Splügen merged into the new municipality of Rheinwald.
- On 1 January 2021, the former municipalities of Casti-Wergenstein, Donat, Lohn and Mathon merged to form the new municipality of Muntogna da Schons.
