= Muntogna da Schons =

- Municipality
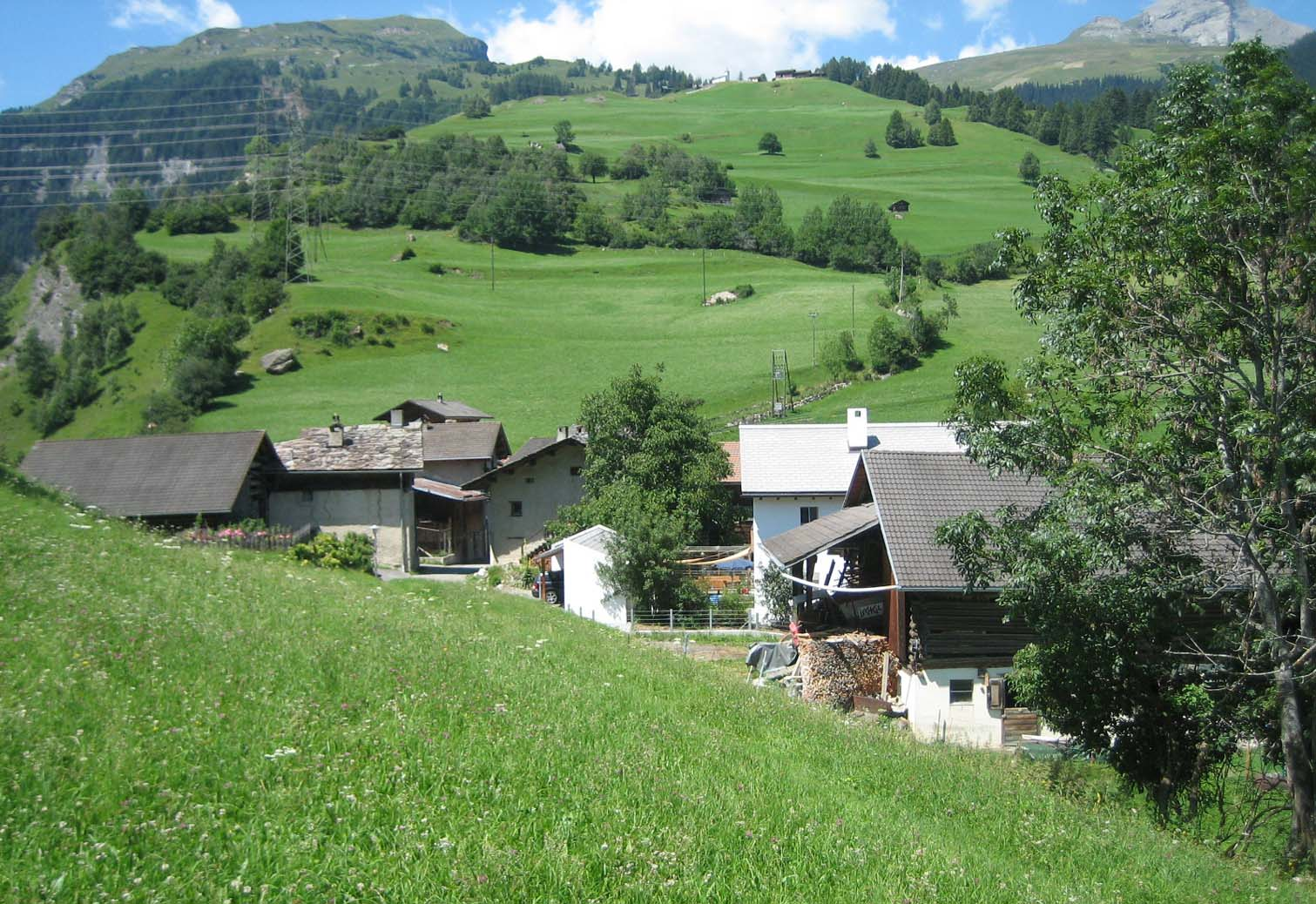
- Casti village

- Flag Coat of arms
- Location of Muntogna da Schons
- Location within Switzerland Location within Canton of Grisons
- Coordinates: 46°37′N 9°25′E
- Country: Switzerland
- Canton: Grisons
- District: Viamala

Government
  - Mayor: Casper Nicca

Area
  - Total: 25.62 km^{2} (9.89 sq mi)
- Time zone: UTC+01:00 (CET)
  - Summer (DST): UTC+02:00 (CEST)
- Postal code: 7433
- SFOS number: 3715
- ISO 3166 code: CH-GR
- Surrounded by: Andeer, Clugin, Safien, Sufers
- Website: https://mdschons.ch

Muntogna da Schons is a municipality in the Viamala Region in the Swiss canton of the Grisons. On 1 January 2021 the former municipalities of Casti-Wergenstein, Donat, Lohn and Mathon merged to form the new municipality of Muntogna da Schons.

== History ==
=== Casti-Wergenstein ===
Casti-Wergenstein was created in 1923 through the union of the formerly independent municipalities of Casti and Wergenstein.

Casti is first mentioned in 1204 as ad Castellum. Wergenstein is first mentioned in 1219 as Vergasteno.

=== Donat ===
Donat is first mentioned in the middle 12th Century as ad Anede.

=== Lohn ===
Lohn is first mentioned in mid-12th Century as Laune and Lune. In 1219 it was mentioned as de Laone.

=== Mathon ===
Mathon is first mentioned about 840 as in Mentaune.

== Demographics ==
The new municipality has a population (as of December 2020) of 360.

== Historic Population ==
The historical population is given in the following chart:
