= Rheinwald, Switzerland =

Rheinwald
- Municipality
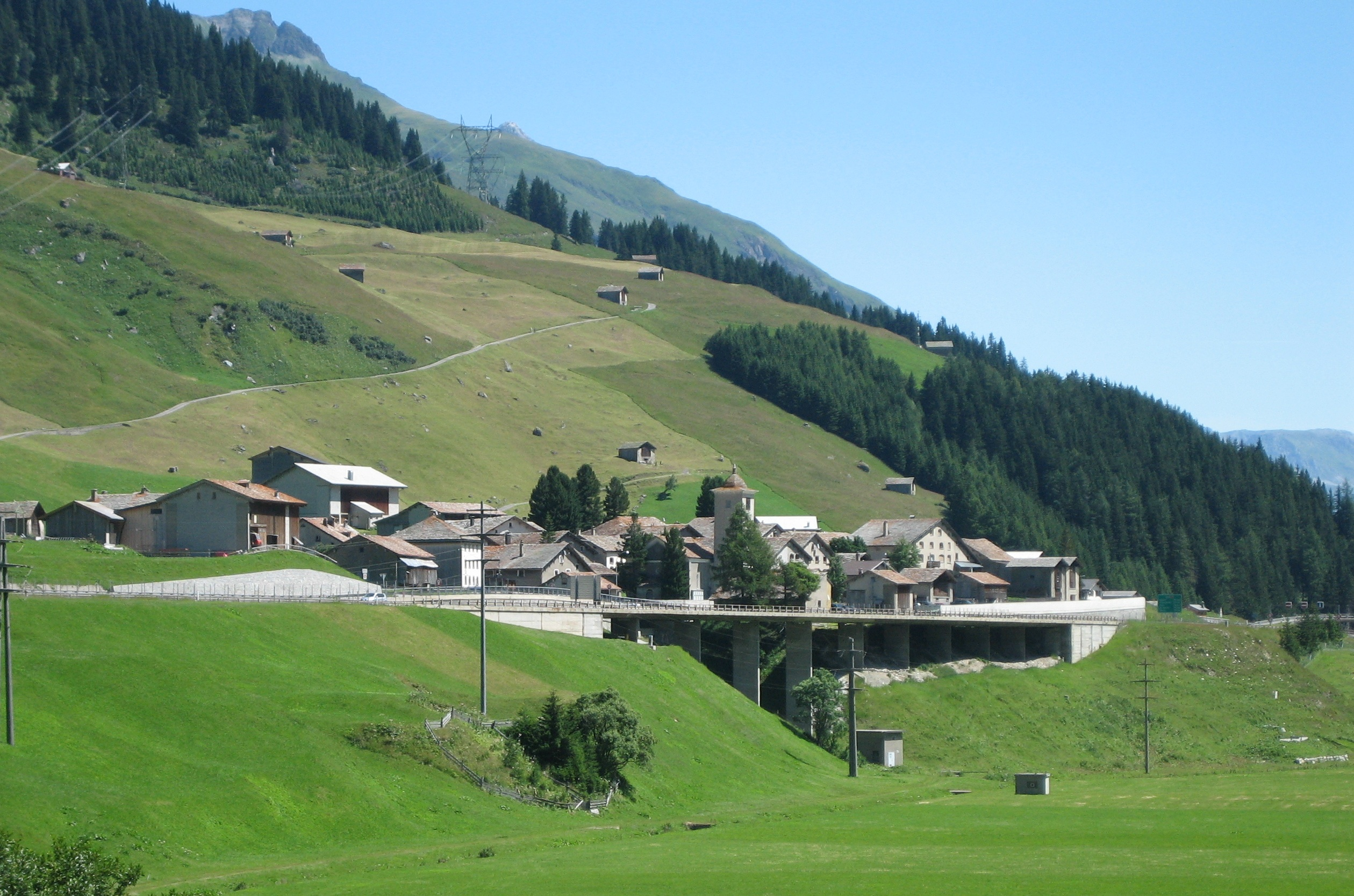

- Flag Coat of arms
- Location of Rheinwald
- Location within Switzerland Location within Canton of Grisons
- Coordinates: 46°32′N 9°12′E
- Country: Switzerland
- Canton: Grisons
- District: Viamala

Area
  - Total: 136.82 km^{2} (52.83 sq mi)

Population (December 2020)
  - Total: 574
  - Density: 4.20/km^{2} (10.9/sq mi)
- Time zone: UTC+01:00 (CET)
  - Summer (DST): UTC+02:00 (CEST)
- Postal code: 7435,37,38
- SFOS number: 3714
- ISO 3166 code: CH-GR
- Surrounded by: Blenio (TI), Malvaglia (TI), Mesocco, Vals
- Website: https://rheinwald.ch/ SFSO statistics

Rheinwald is a municipality in the Viamala Region in the Swiss canton of the Grisons. On 1 January 2019 the former municipalities of Hinterrhein, Nufenen and Splügen merged to form the new municipality of Rheinwald.

== History ==
=== Hinterrhein ===
Hinterrhein is first mentioned in 1219 as de Reno.

=== Nufenen ===
Nufenen was first mentioned in 1343 as Ovena. In 1633 it was mentioned as Nufena. In Romansh it was known as Nueinas and it used to be known as Novena in Italian.

=== Splügen ===
Splügen is first mentioned about 840 as cella in Speluca.

== Geography ==
After the merger, Rheinwald has an area, as of 2009, of 136.82 km^{2} (52.83 sq mi).

== Demographics ==
The new municipality has a population (as of December 2020) of 574.

== Historic Population ==
The historical population is given in the following chart:

== Heritage sites of national significance ==
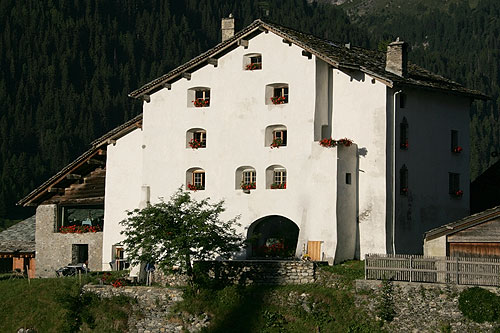
Hotel Weiss Kreuz

The Alte Landbrücke (Old Bridge) and the Säumerherberge (mule drivers hostel) Weiss Kreuz are listed as Swiss heritage sites of national significance.

== Wakker Prize ==
In 1995, the Swiss Heritage Society bestowed the Wakker Prize on the village of Splügen. The prize description notes that Splügen had reached a notable compromise between preservation and tourism. The old town was strictly protected to maintain the original appearance, while rational zone planning allowed development to occur outside the old village.

== Climate ==
Between 1961 and 1990 Hinterrhein had an average of 121.4 days of rain per year and on average received 1,469 mm (57.8 in) of precipitation. The wettest month was May during which time Hinterrhein received an average of 194 mm (7.6 in) of precipitation. During this month there was precipitation for an average of 14.2 days. The driest month of the year was February with an average of 45 mm (1.8 in) of precipitation over 14.2 days.

Climate data for Hinterrhein (1981-2010)
Month	Jan	Feb	Mar	Apr	May	Jun	Jul	Aug	Sep	Oct	Nov	Dec	Year
Mean daily maximum °C (°F)	−1.5 (29.3)	−0.6 (30.9)	2.6 (36.7)	5.6 (42.1)	11.2 (52.2)	15.3 (59.5)	18.1 (64.6)	17.5 (63.5)	13.6 (56.5)	9.6 (49.3)	3.0 (37.4)	−0.8 (30.6)	7.8 (46.0)
Daily mean °C (°F)	−6.3 (20.7)	−5.8 (21.6)	−2.1 (28.2)	1.6 (34.9)	6.5 (43.7)	10.0 (50.0)	12.5 (54.5)	12.0 (53.6)	8.5 (47.3)	4.6 (40.3)	−1.2 (29.8)	−5.0 (23.0)	2.9 (37.2)
Mean daily minimum °C (°F)	−11.6 (11.1)	−11.9 (10.6)	−7.4 (18.7)	−2.7 (27.1)	1.8 (35.2)	4.3 (39.7)	6.4 (43.5)	6.5 (43.7)	3.5 (38.3)	0.1 (32.2)	−5.3 (22.5)	−9.6 (14.7)	−2.2 (28.0)
Average precipitation mm (inches)	50 (2.0)	37 (1.5)	65 (2.6)	137 (5.4)	197 (7.8)	175 (6.9)	171 (6.7)	184 (7.2)	186 (7.3)	179 (7.0)	150 (5.9)	67 (2.6)	1,598 (62.9)
Average snowfall cm (inches)	80.1 (31.5)	63 (25)	71.4 (28.1)	66.5 (26.2)	13.2 (5.2)	8.6 (3.4)	0.2 (0.1)	1.1 (0.4)	3.7 (1.5)	17.8 (7.0)	42.7 (16.8)	68.8 (27.1)	437.1 (172.1)
Average precipitation days (≥ 1.0 mm)	6.7	5.6	7.2	10.1	13.0	12.4	11.8	12.2	9.4	9.7	8.8	7.2	114.1
Average snowy days (≥ 1.0 cm)	8.9	8.4	8.1	7.1	2.1	0.8	0.1	0.2	0.5	1.8	5.8	9	52.8
Average relative humidity (%)	73	72	72	73	73	73	73	76	77	76	76	75	74
Mean monthly sunshine hours	59	94	117	112	149	166	193	174	128	103	58	39	1,391
Source: MeteoSwiss
