= Mathon, Switzerland =

Mathon
- Former municipality
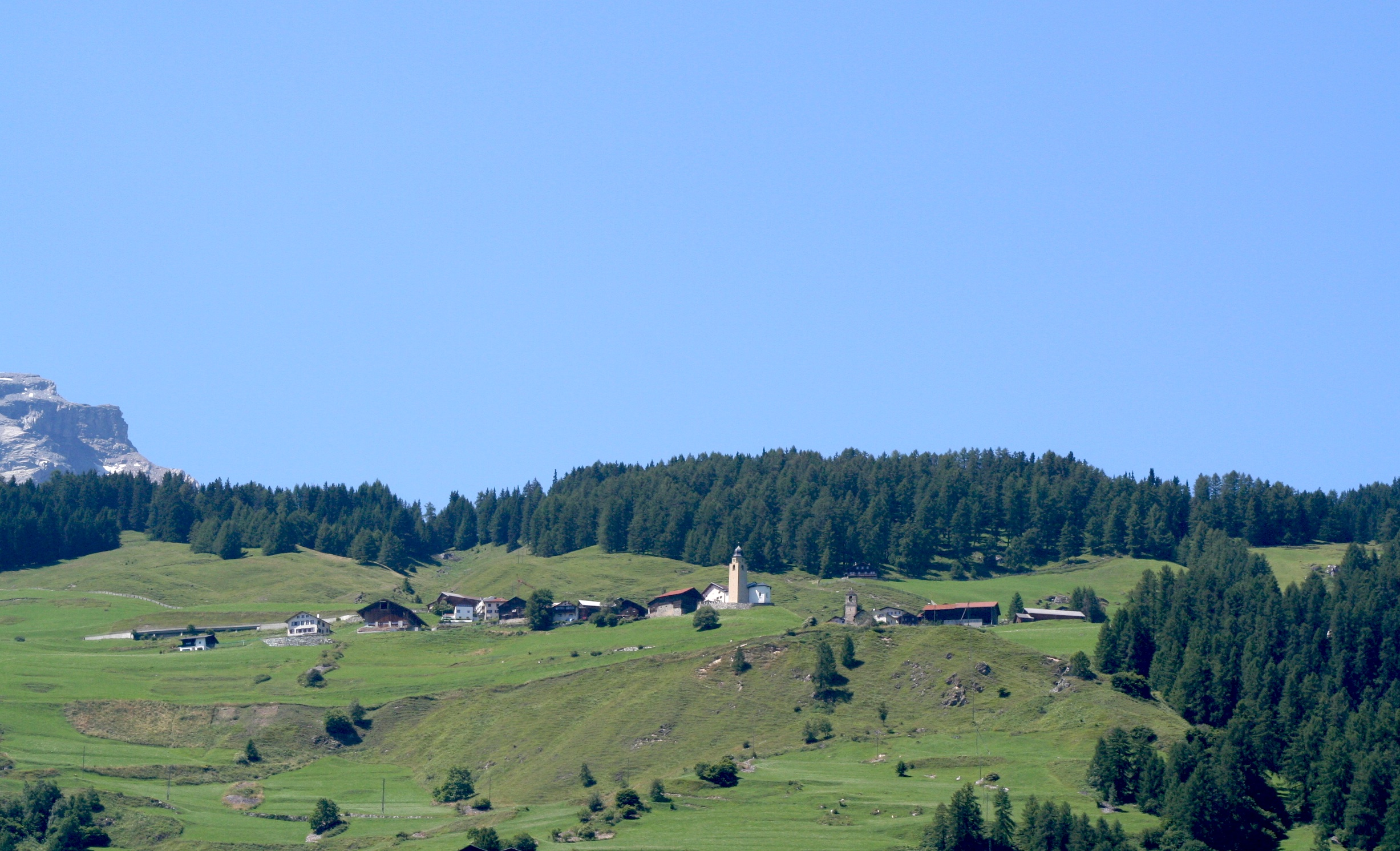

- Coat of arms
- Location of Mathon
- Location within Switzerland Location within Canton of Graubünden
- Coordinates: 46°38.17′N 9°24.85′E
- Country: Switzerland
- Canton: Graubünden
- District: Viamala

Area
  - Total: 15.13 km^{2} (5.84 sq mi)
- Elevation: 1,521 m (4,990 ft)

Population (December 2019)
  - Total: 53
  - Density: 3.5/km^{2} (9.1/sq mi)
- Time zone: UTC+01:00 (CET)
  - Summer (DST): UTC+02:00 (CEST)
- Postal code: 7433
- SFOS number: 3708
- ISO 3166 code: CH-GR
- Surrounded by: Casti-Wergenstein, Donat, Lohn, Safien, Tschappina
- Website: www.mathon.ch

Mathon (Romansh: Maton) is a former municipality in the Viamala Region in the Swiss canton of Graubünden. On 1 January 2021 the former municipalities of Casti-Wergenstein, Donat, Lohn and Mathon merged to form the new municipality of Muntogna da Schons.

== History ==
Mathon is first mentioned about 840 as in Mentaune.

== Geography ==
Mathon had an area, as of 2006, of 15.1 km^{2} (5.8 sq mi). Of this area, 66.3% is used for agricultural purposes, while 10% is forested. Of the rest of the land, 1.4% is settled (buildings or roads) and the remainder (22.3%) is non-productive (rivers, glaciers or mountains).

Before 2017, the former municipality was located in the Schams sub-district, of the Hinterrhein district, after 2017 it was part of the Viamala Region. The village is a haufendorf (an irregular, unplanned and quite closely packed village, built around a central square) at an elevation of 1,521 m (4,990 ft) in the center of the upper Schamserberg region.

== Demographics ==
Mathon had a population (as of 2019) of 53. Over the last 10 years the population has decreased at a rate of 14.1%.

As of 2000, the gender distribution of the population was 56.4% male and 43.6% female. The age distribution, as of 2000, in Mathon is; 12 people or 23.1% of the population are between 0 and 9 years old. 6 people or 11.5% are 10 to 14, and 1 person or 1.9% is 15 to 19. Of the adult population, 3 people or 5.8% of the population are between 20 and 29 years old. 8 people or 15.4% are 30 to 39, 6 people or 11.5% are 40 to 49, and 2 people or 3.8% are 50 to 59. The senior population distribution is 6 people or 11.5% of the population are between 60 and 69 years old, 6 people or 11.5% are 70 to 79, there is 1 person or 1.9% who is 80 to 89, and 1 person who is 90 to 99.

In the 2007 federal election the most popular party was the SVP which received 66.9% of the vote. The next three most popular parties were the SPS (19.2%), the FDP (12.3%) and the CVP (1.5%).

In Mathon about 78.3% of the population (between age 25–64) have completed either non-mandatory upper secondary education or additional higher education (either university or a Fachhochschule).

Mathon has an unemployment rate of 0.83%. As of 2005, there were 17 people employed in the primary economic sector and about 8 businesses involved in this sector. people are employed in the secondary sector and there are businesses in this sector. 8 people are employed in the tertiary sector, with 3 businesses in this sector.

The historical population is given in the following table:

year	population
1780	123
1850	111
1900	74
1950	65
2000	52

== Languages ==
Most of the population (as of 2000) speaks Romansh (53.8%), with the rest speaking German (46.2%). The municipality is about evenly divided between German-speaking and Romansh-speaking population. Although 87% of the population understands Romansch, German is now the sole official language.
