= Zillis-Reischen =

- Municipality
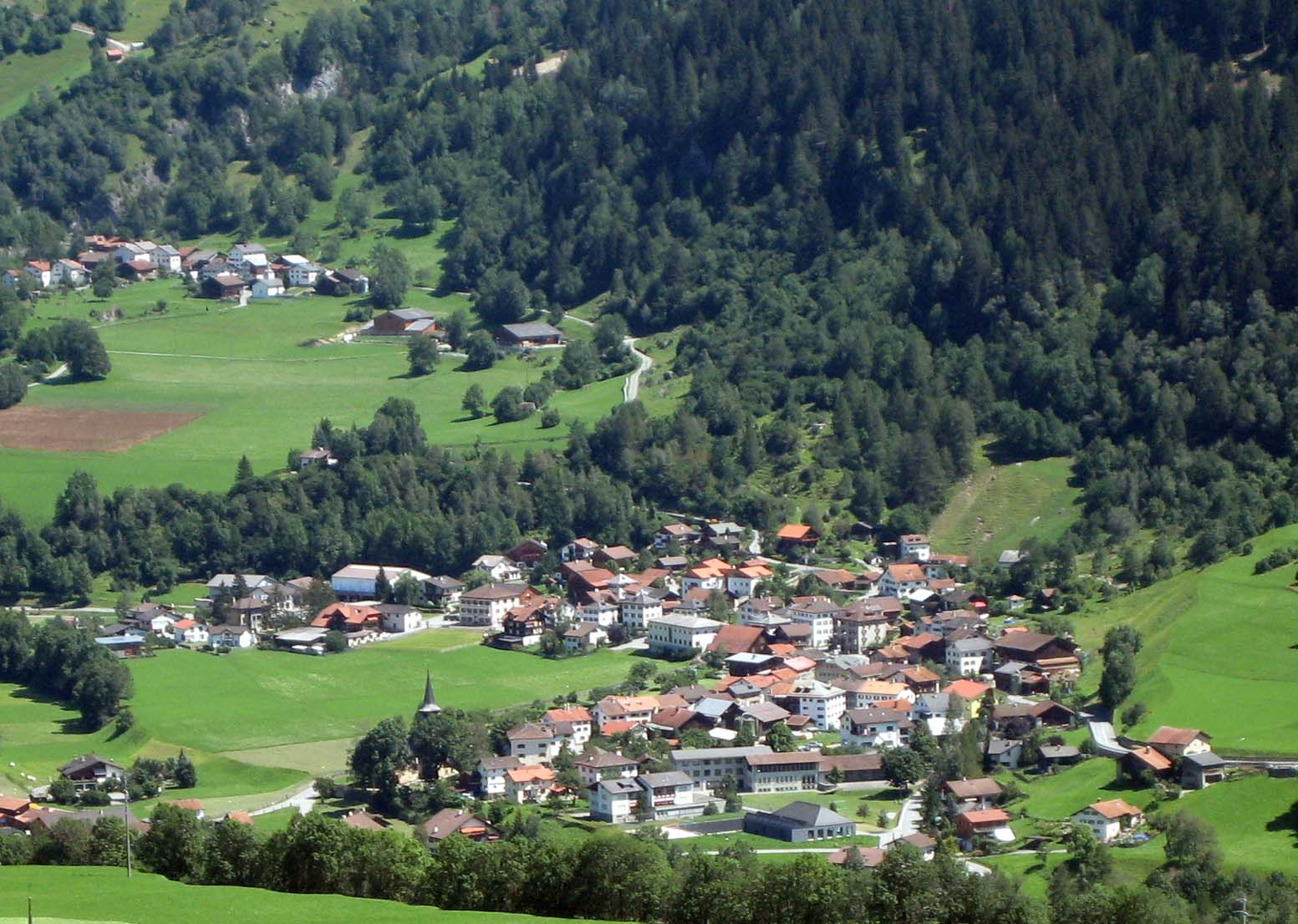

- Flag Coat of arms
- Location of Zillis-Reischen
- Location within Switzerland Location within Canton of Grisons
- Coordinates: 46°38′N 9°26′E
- Country: Switzerland
- Canton: Grisons
- District: Viamala

Area
  - Total: 24.46 km^{2} (9.44 sq mi)
- Elevation: 945 m (3,100 ft)

Population (December 2020)
  - Total: 389
  - Density: 15.9/km^{2} (41.2/sq mi)
- Time zone: UTC+01:00 (CET)
  - Summer (DST): UTC+02:00 (CEST)
- Postal code: 7432
- SFOS number: 3712
- ISO 3166 code: CH-GR
- Surrounded by: Donat, Lohn, Mutten, Pignia, Rongellen, Salouf, Sils im Domleschg, Stierva
- Website: www.zillis-reischen.ch

Zillis-Reischen (Romansh: Ziràn-Reschen) is a municipality in the Viamala Region in the Swiss canton of the Grisons.

== History ==
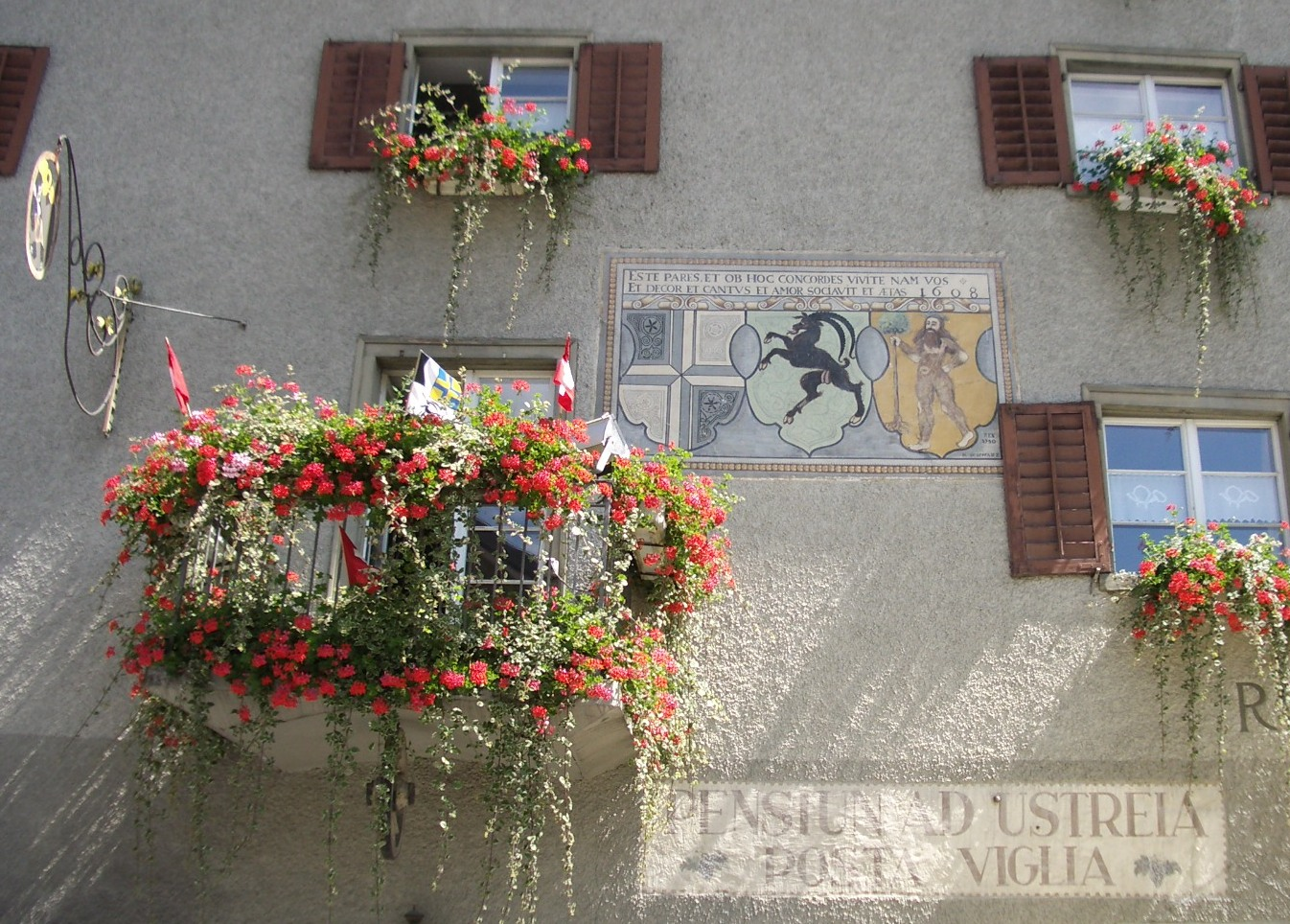
House in Zillis

Zillis-Reischen was created in 1875 with the union of the previously independent municipalities of Reischen and Zillis. Zillis was first mentioned in the first half of the 9th Century as Ciranes. Reischen was first mentioned in 1219 as de Rexeno.

The municipality site was certainly inhabited even earlier, as a Roman settlement and graves from the 6th or 7th century indicate. A treasure trove of 10th Century coins that were found near the village indicate that there was trade over the Viamala pass by this time.

The first church in Zillis dates from about the 5th Century. The three-apse church is from the 8th Century, and around 840 the parish church of St. Martin was first mentioned. In 940 King Otto I gave the Zillis Church to the Bishop of Chur. This gift did not include the church's property, four large farms in Schams and Rheinwald.

In 1473 the Viamala road over the Alps opened, which increased traffic on the Splügen and San Bernardino passes. The villages flourished with this increased trade. In 1530-35 Zillis and Reischen converted during the Protestant Reformation.

In 1818-23 the Viamala road was expanded with a wider road, which brought increased trade into the villages.

== Geography ==
Zillis-Reischen is located in the valley of the Hinterrhein.

Zillis-Reischen has an area, as of 2006, of 24.5 km^{2} (9.5 sq mi). Of this area, 32.5% is used for agricultural purposes, while 42.8% is forested. Of the rest of the land, 1.8% is settled (buildings or roads) and the remainder (22.9%) is non-productive (rivers, glaciers or mountains).

Before 2017, the municipality was located in the Schams sub-district, of the Hinterrhein district, after 2017 it was part of the Viamala Region. In 1875, the municipality expanded with the unification of the previously independent municipalities of Reischen and Zillis.

== Demographics ==
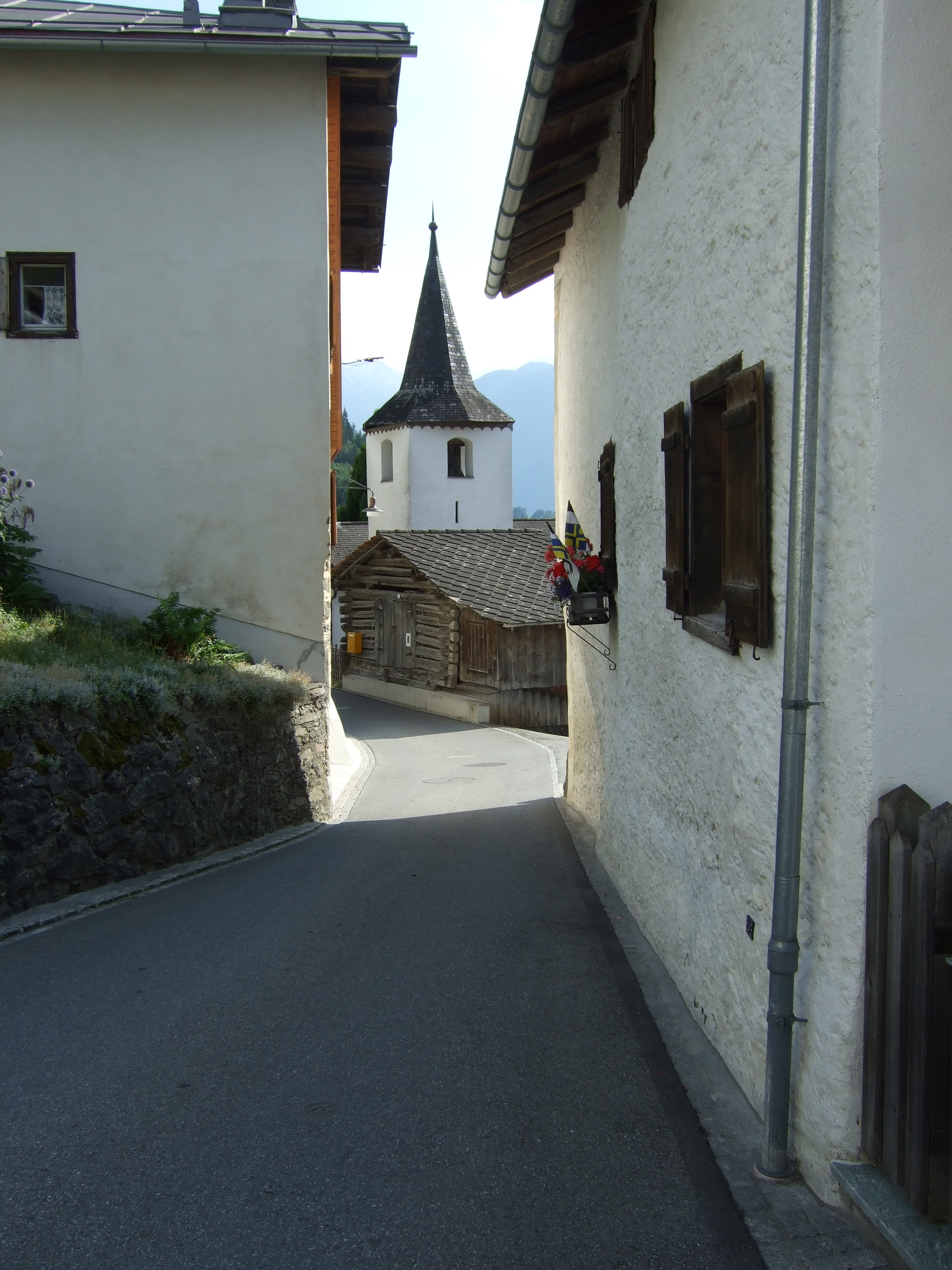
Reischen village church

Zillis-Reischen has a population (as of 31 December 2020) of 389. As of 2008, 6.8% of the population was made up of foreign nationals. Over the last 10 years the population has grown at a rate of 6.7%.

As of 2000, the gender distribution of the population was 52.6% male and 47.4% female. The age distribution, as of 2000, in Zillis-Reischen is; 46 people or 13.9% of the population are between 0 and 9 years old. 23 people or 7.0% are 10 to 14, and 15 people or 4.5% are 15 to 19. Of the adult population, 23 people or 7.0% of the population are between 20 and 29 years old. 50 people or 15.2% are 30 to 39, 47 people or 14.2% are 40 to 49, and 37 people or 11.2% are 50 to 59. The senior population distribution is 34 people or 10.3% of the population are between 60 and 69 years old, 32 people or 9.7% are 70 to 79, there are 18 people or 5.5% who are 80 to 89, and there are 5 people or 1.5% who are 90 to 99.

In the 2007 federal election the most popular party was the SVP which received 49.8% of the vote. The next three most popular parties were the FDP (23.7%), the SPS (18.1%) and the CVP (7.8%).

In Zillis-Reischen about 70.3% of the population (between age 25–64) have completed either non-mandatory upper secondary education or additional higher education (either university or a Fachhochschule).

Zillis-Reischen has an unemployment rate of 1.24%. As of 2005, there were 38 people employed in the primary economic sector and about 12 businesses involved in this sector. 106 people are employed in the secondary sector and there are 8 businesses in this sector. 52 people are employed in the tertiary sector, with 22 businesses in this sector.

The historical population is given in the following table:

Year	Population
1850	392
1900	263
1950	276
1960	315
1970	318
1980	252
1990	312
2000	330

== Languages ==
Most of the population (as of 2000) speaks German (79.7%), with Romansh being second most common (12.7%) and Italian being third ( 2.1%).

Languages in Zillis-Reischen
Languages	Census 1980		Census 1990		Census 2000	
Languages	Number	Percent	Number	Percent	Number	Percent
German	136	53.97%	229	73.40%	263	79.70%
Romansh	104	41.27%	72	23.08%	42	12.73%
Population	252	100%	312	100%	330	100%

== Heritage sites of national significance ==
St. Martin's Church, Zillis, the Cave under Hasenstein (a Roman cult site) and the Wildener- and Premoli-Bridges are listed as Swiss heritage sites of national significance.

The first church in Zillis dates from about the 5th century. The three-apse church is from the 8th Century, and around 840 the parish church of St. Martin was first mentioned. However, it is the third church from the 12th century which still stands today. It is renowned for its romanesque style art painted wooden ceiling depicting the life of Jesus and the life of St. Martin.

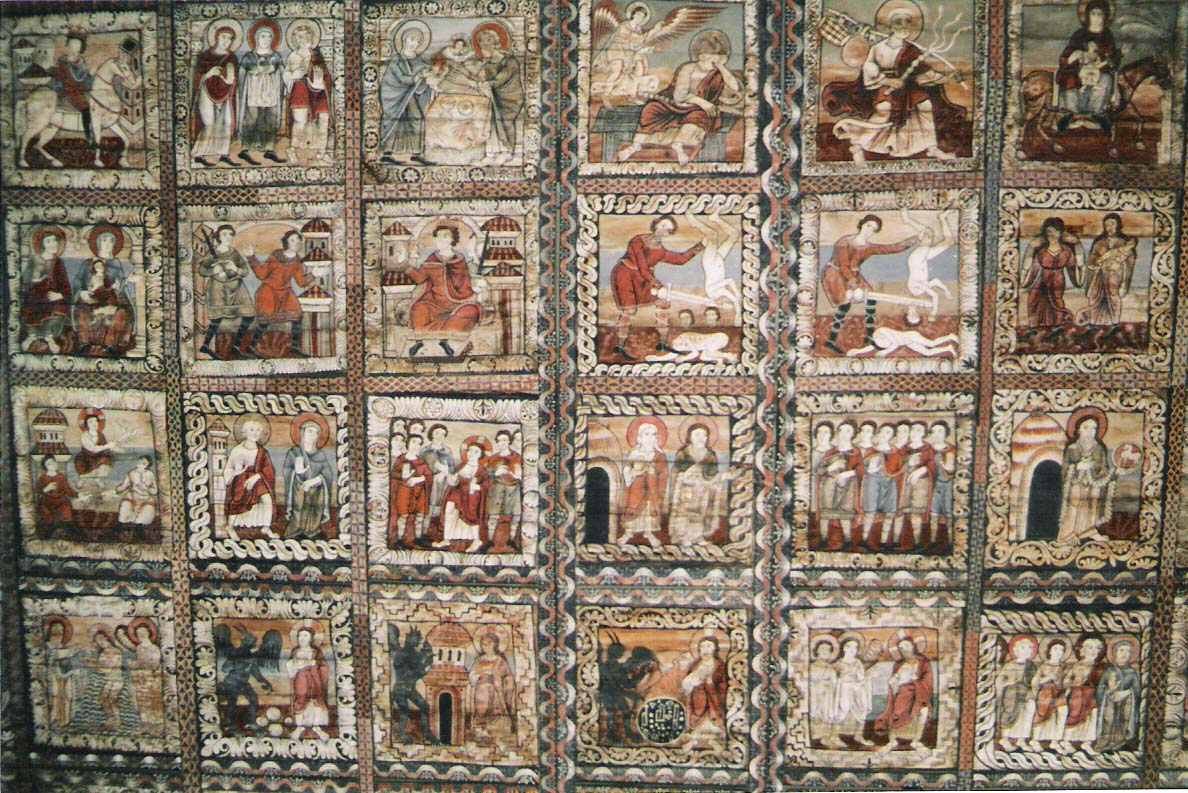
Decorated ceiling in S. Martegn/St Martin's Church

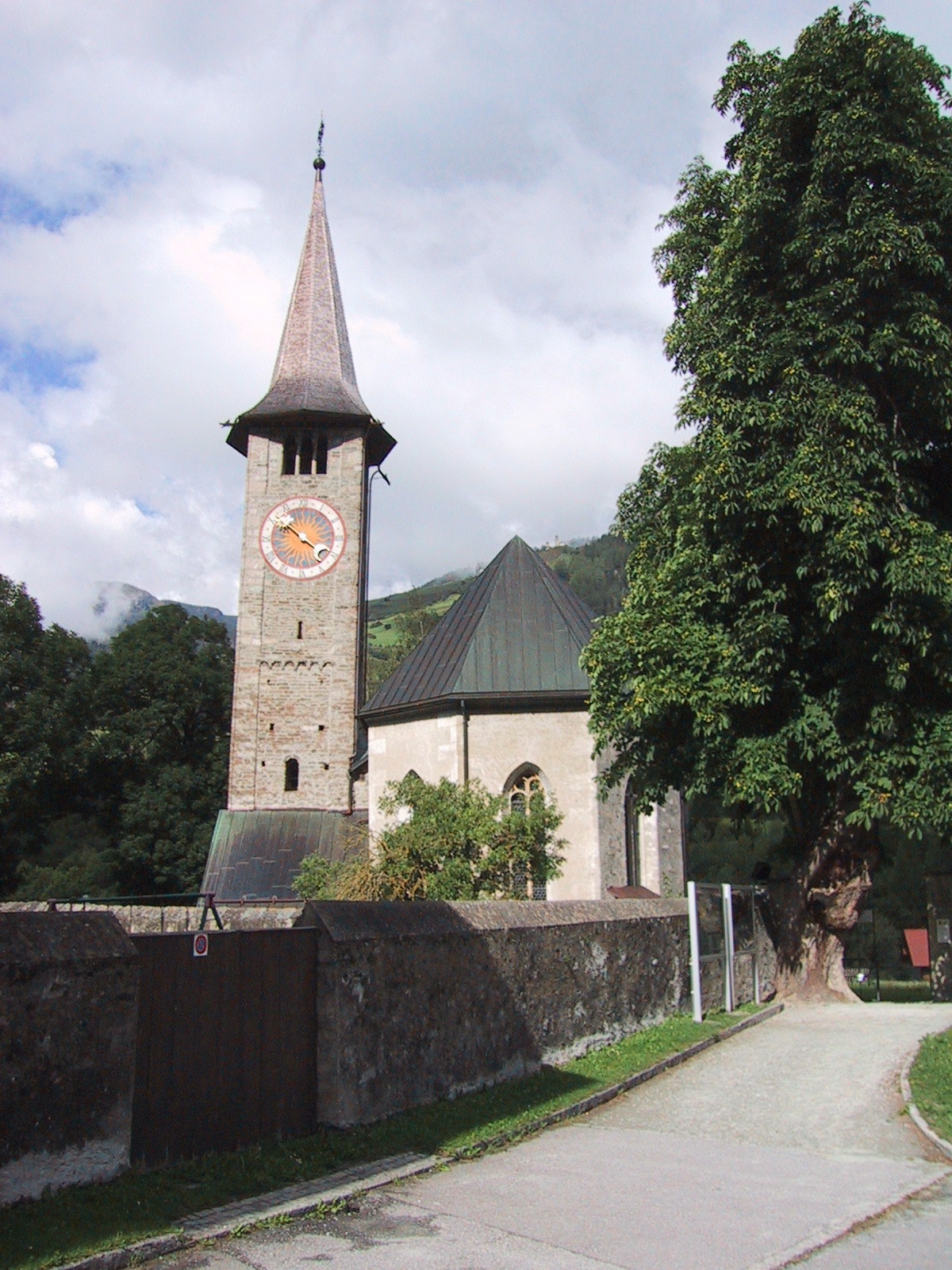
St. Martin's in Zillis

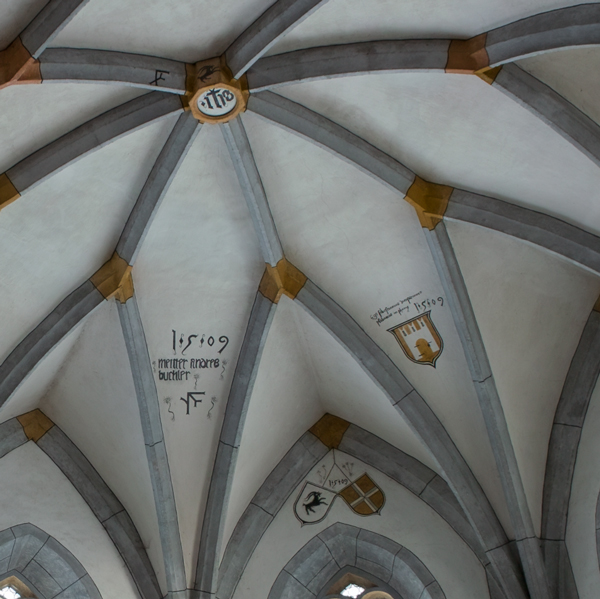
Vaulted ceiling of St. Martin's church
