= Lohn, Graubünden =

Lohn
- Former municipality
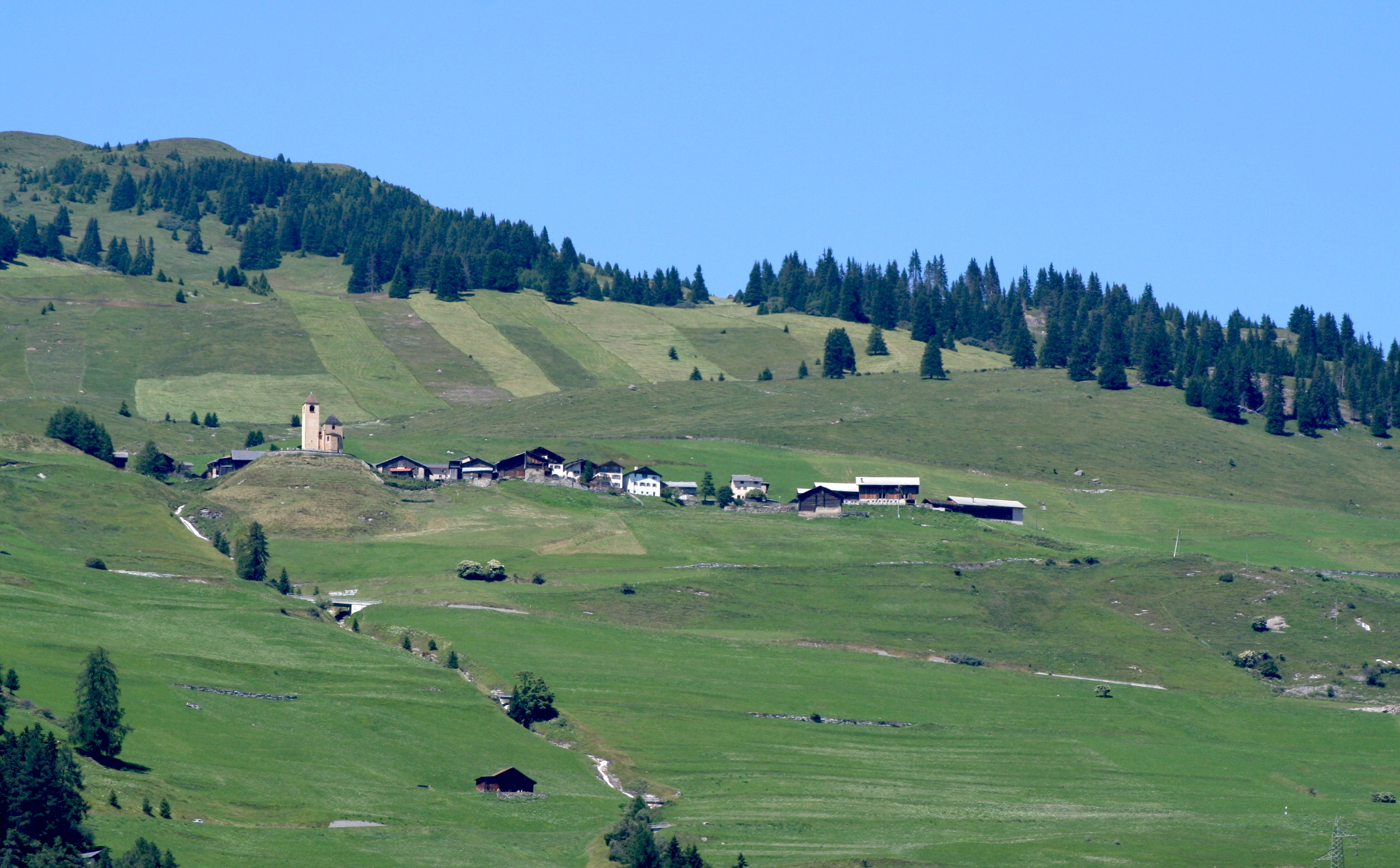

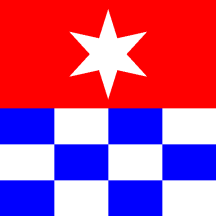
- Flag Coat of arms
- Location of Lohn
- Location within Switzerland Location within Canton of Graubünden
- Coordinates: 46°39′N 9°25′E
- Country: Switzerland
- Canton: Graubünden
- District: Viamala

Area
  - Total: 43.95 km^{2} (16.97 sq mi)
- Elevation: 1,585 m (5,200 ft)

Population (December 2019)
  - Total: 52
  - Density: 1.2/km^{2} (3.1/sq mi)
- Time zone: UTC+01:00 (CET)
  - Summer (DST): UTC+02:00 (CEST)
- Postal code: 7433
- SFOS number: 3707
- ISO 3166 code: CH-GR
- Surrounded by: Donat, Mathon, Rongellen, Thusis, Tschappina, Urmein, Zillis-Reischen
- Website: www.lohn-gr.ch

Lohn (Romansh: Lon) is a former municipality in the Viamala Region in the Swiss canton of Graubünden. On 1 January 2021 the former municipalities of Casti-Wergenstein, Donat, Lohn and Mathon merged to form the new municipality of Muntogna da Schons.

== History ==
Lohn is first mentioned in mid-12th Century as Laune and Lune. In 1219 it was mentioned as de Laone.

== Geography ==
Lohn had an area, as of 2006, of 8.1 km^{2} (3.1 sq mi). Of this area, 56.5% is used for agricultural purposes, while 35% is forested. Of the rest of the land, 1.5% is settled (buildings or roads) and the remainder (7%) is non-productive (rivers, glaciers or mountains).

Before 2017, the former municipality was located in the Schams sub-district, of the Hinterrhein district, after 2017 it was part of the Viamala Region. It is a haufendorf (an irregular, unplanned and quite closely packed village, built around a central square) located at an elevation of 1,582 m (5,190 ft) on the upper Schamserberg.

== Demographics ==
Lohn had a population (as of 2019) of 52. Over the last 10 years the population has decreased at a rate of -10.7%.

As of 2000, the gender distribution of the population was 44.0% male and 56.0% female. The age distribution, as of 2000, in Lohn is; 5 people or 10.0% of the population are between 0 and 9 years old. 9 people or 18.0% are 10 to 14, and people or 0.0% are 15 to 19. Of the adult population, 1 person or 2.0% of the population is between 20 and 29 years old. 5 people or 10.0% are 30 to 39, 9 people or 18.0% are 40 to 49, and 1 person or 2.0% is 50 to 59. The senior population distribution is 10 people or 20.0% of the population are between 60 and 69 years old, 10 people or 20.0% are 70 to 79.

In the 2007 federal election the most popular party was the SVP which received 45.1% of the vote. The next three most popular parties were the FDP (28.9%), the SPS (21.8%) and the CVP (4.2%).

In Lohn about 82.4% of the population (between age 25–64) have completed either non-mandatory upper secondary education or additional higher education (either university or a Fachhochschule).

Lohn has an unemployment rate of 0%. As of 2005, there were 23 people employed in the primary economic sector and about 7 businesses involved in this sector.

The historical population is given in the following graph:

== Languages ==
Most of the population (as of 2000) speaks Rhaeto-Romance (52.0%) and the rest speak German (48.0%).

Languages in Lohn
Languages	Census 1980		Census 1990		Census 2000	
Languages	Number	Percent	Number	Percent	Number	Percent
German	0	0.00%	18	37.50%	24	48.00%
Romanish	36	100%	30	62.50%	26	52.00%
Population	36	100%	48	100%	50	100%
