= Rongellen =

- Municipality
- Flag Coat of arms
- Location of Rongellen
- Location within Switzerland Location within Canton of Grisons
- Coordinates: 46°40′37″N 9°26′44″E
- Country: Switzerland
- Canton: Grisons
- District: Viamala

Area
  - Total: 2.02 km^{2} (0.78 sq mi)
- Elevation: 1,003 m (3,291 ft)

Population (December 2020)
  - Total: 56
  - Density: 28/km^{2} (72/sq mi)
- Time zone: UTC+01:00 (CET)
  - Summer (DST): UTC+02:00 (CEST)
- Postal code: 7430
- SFOS number: 3711
- ISO 3166 code: CH-GR
- Surrounded by: Lohn, Sils im Domleschg, Thusis, Zillis-Reischen
- Website: www.rongellen.ch

Rongellen is a municipality in the canton of the Grisons in Switzerland, located in the Viamala Region.

== History ==
Rongellen is first mentioned in 1344 as Rungal.

== Geography ==
Rongellen has an area, as of 2006, of 2 km^{2} (0.77 sq mi). Of this area, 15.2% is used for agricultural purposes, while 63.2% is forested. Of the rest of the land, 5.4% is settled (buildings or roads) and the remainder (16.2%) is non-productive (rivers, glaciers or mountains).

Before 2017, the municipality was located in the Schams sub-district, of the Hinterrhein district, after 2017, it was part of the Viamala Region. It consists of scattered individual farm houses and small groups of houses in a clearing along the old Viamala road.

== Demographics ==
Rongellen has a population (as of 31 December 2020) of 56. As of 2008, 11.1% of the population was made up of foreign nationals. Over the last 10 years the population has decreased at a rate of -4.3%.

As of 2000, the gender distribution of the population was 53.3% male and 46.7% female. The age distribution, as of 2000, in Rongellen is; 2 people or 3.8% of the population are between 0 and 9 years old. 2 people or 3.8% are 10 to 14, and 11 people or 20.8% are 15 to 19. Of the adult population, 8 people or 15.1% of the population are between 20 and 29 years old. 7 people or 13.2% are 30 to 39, 5 people or 9.4% are 40 to 49, and 8 people or 15.1% are 50 to 59. The senior population distribution is 2 people or 3.8% of the population are between 60 and 69 years old, 7 people or 13.2% are 70 to 79, there is 1 person or 1.9% who is 80 to 89.

In the 2007 federal election the most popular party was the SVP which received 65.6% of the vote. The next two most popular parties were the FDP (11.1%) and the CVP (10%).

In Rongellen about 69.6% of the population (between age 25–64) have completed either non-mandatory upper secondary education or additional higher education (either university or a Fachhochschule).

Rongellen has an unemployment rate of 4.8%. As of 2005, there were 3 people employed in the primary economic sector and about 1 business involved in this sector. No one is employed in the secondary sector and there are no businesses in this sector. 3 people are employed in the tertiary sector, with 1 business in this sector.

The historical population is given in the following table:

year	population
1780	75
1850	63
1900	49
1950	71
2000	53

== Languages ==
Most of the population (as of 2000) speaks German (88.7%), with Romansh being second most common ( 9.4%).

Languages in Rongellen
Languages	Census 1980		Census 1990		Census 2000	
Languages	Number	Percent	Number	Percent	Number	Percent
German	28	87.50%	45	93.75%	47	88.68%
Romanish	3	9.38%	1	2.08%	5	9.43%
Population	32	100%	48	100%	53	100%
