= Scharans =

- Municipality
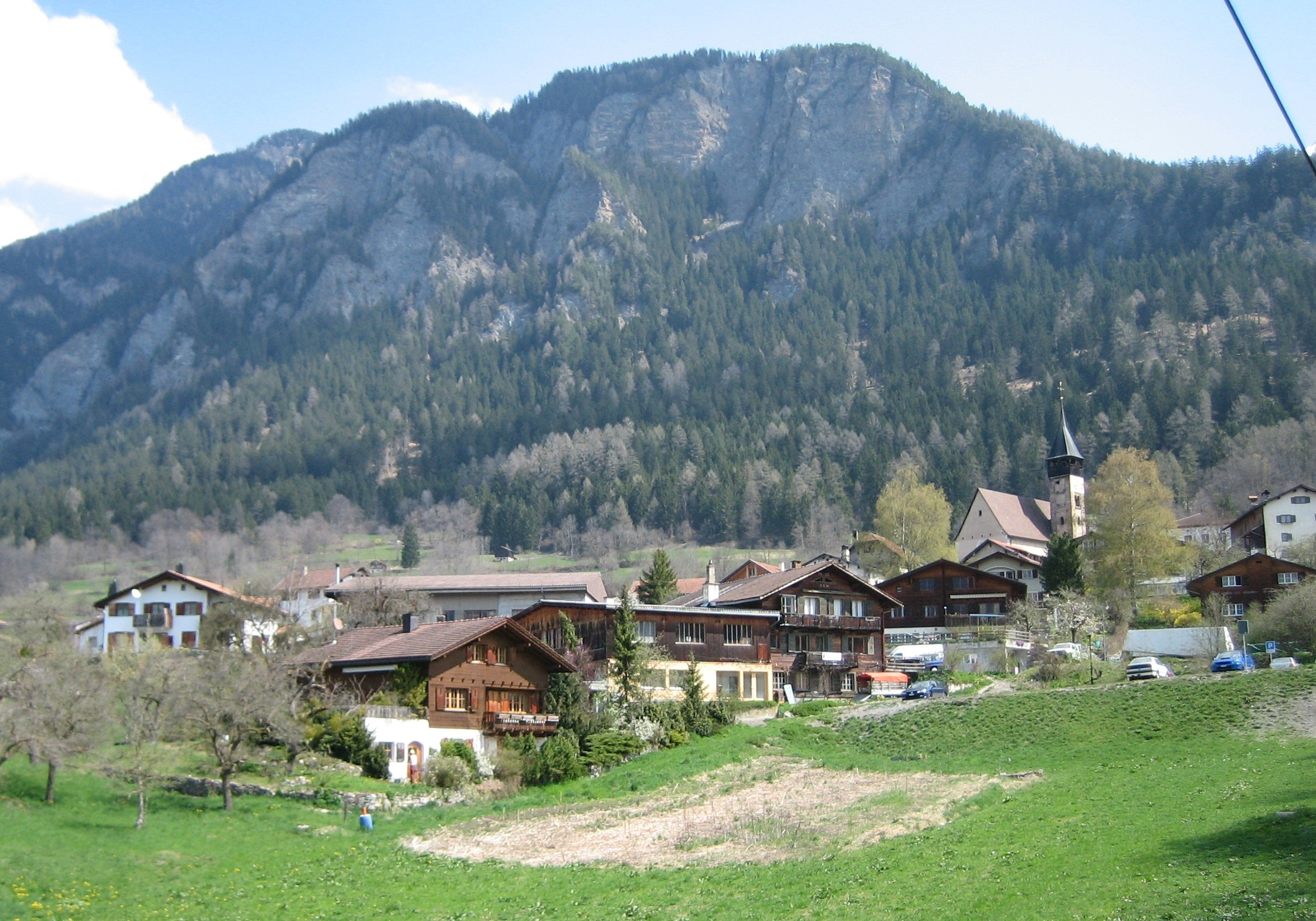

- Flag Coat of arms
- Location of Scharans
- Location within Switzerland Location within Canton of Grisons
- Coordinates: 46°43′N 9°27′E
- Country: Switzerland
- Canton: Grisons
- District: Viamala

Area
  - Total: 14.29 km^{2} (5.52 sq mi)
- Elevation: 760 m (2,490 ft)

Population (December 2020)
  - Total: 796
  - Density: 55.7/km^{2} (144/sq mi)
- Time zone: UTC+01:00 (CET)
  - Summer (DST): UTC+02:00 (CEST)
- Postal code: 7412
- SFOS number: 3638
- ISO 3166 code: CH-GR
- Surrounded by: Almens, Fürstenau, Sils im Domleschg, Vaz/Obervaz
- Website: www.scharans.ch

Scharans (Romansh: Scharons) is a municipality in the Viamala Region in the Swiss canton of the Grisons.

== History ==
Scharans is first mentioned in 1200 as agrum Schraunis.

== Geography ==
Aerial view from 2000 m by Walter Mittelholzer (1925)

Scharans has an area, as of 2006, of 14.3 km^{2} (5.5 sq mi). Of this area, 26.1% is used for agricultural purposes, while 62% is forested. Of the rest of the land, 2.9% is settled (buildings or roads) and the remainder (9%) is non-productive (rivers, glaciers or mountains).

Before 2017, the municipality was located in the Domleschg sub-district, of the Hinterrhein district, after 2017 it was part of the Viamala Region. It consists of the haufendorf (an irregular, unplanned and quite closely packed village, built around a central square) of Scharans and the hamlets of St. Agata, Stufels, Parnegl and Prin. It is located on a low terrace on the right hand side of the Albula and Hinterrhein rivers.

== Demographics ==
Scharans has a population (as of 31 December 2020) of 796. As of 2008, 5.1% of the population was made up of foreign nationals. Over the last 10 years the population has grown at a rate of 14.9%.

As of 2000, the gender distribution of the population was 49.1% male and 50.9% female. The age distribution, as of 2000, in Scharans is; 267 people or 8.7% of the population are between 0 and 9 years old. 155 people or 5.1% are 10 to 14, and 281 people or 9.2% are 15 to 19. Of the adult population, 460 people or 15.0% of the population are between 20 and 29 years old. 541 people or 17.6% are 30 to 39, 462 people or 15.1% are 40 to 49, and 385 people or 12.5% are 50 to 59. The senior population distribution is 209 people or 6.8% of the population are between 60 and 69 years old, 189 people or 6.2% are 70 to 79, there are 103 people or 3.4% who are 80 to 89, and there are 17 people or 0.6% who are 90 to 99.

In the 2007 federal election the most popular party was the SVP which received 37.6% of the vote. The next three most popular parties were the SPS (34.4%), the FDP (15.8%) and the CVP (6.6%).

In Scharans about 74.9% of the population (between age 25-64) have completed either non-mandatory upper secondary education or additional higher education (either university or a Fachhochschule).

Scharans has an unemployment rate of 1.08%. As of 2005, there were 32 people employed in the primary economic sector and about 15 businesses involved in this sector. 21 people are employed in the secondary sector and there are 6 businesses in this sector. 236 people are employed in the tertiary sector, with 23 businesses in this sector.

From the 2000 census, 1,180 or 38.4% are Roman Catholic, while 1,510 or 49.2% belonged to the Swiss Reformed Church. Of the rest of the population, there are less than 5 individuals who belong to the Christian Catholic faith, there are 76 individuals (or about 2.48% of the population) who belong to the Orthodox Church, and there are 60 individuals (or about 1.96% of the population) who belong to another Christian church. There are 19 (or about 0.62% of the population) who are Islamic. There are 11 individuals (or about 0.36% of the population) who belong to another church (not listed on the census), 135 (or about 4.40% of the population) belong to no church, are agnostic or atheist, and 78 individuals (or about 2.54% of the population) did not answer the question.

The historical population is given in the following table:

year	population
1803	336
1850	416
1900	439
1950	480
1960	473
2000	817

== Languages ==
Most of the population (as of 2000) speaks German (95.7%), with Romansh being second most common ( 2.1%) and Italian being third ( 0.9%).

Languages in Scharans
Languages	Census 1980		Census 1990		Census 2000	
Languages	Number	Percent	Number	Percent	Number	Percent
German	484	82.59%	628	89.46%	782	95.72%
Romanish	69	11.77%	22	3.13%	17	2.08%
Italian	14	2.39%	18	2.56%	7	0.86%
Population	586	100%	702	100%	817	100%

== Heritage sites of national significance ==
The Haus Bardill (formerly known as Haus Gees) is listed as a Swiss heritage sites of national significance.
