= Nufenen =

Former municipality in Graubünden, Switzerland

- Former municipality
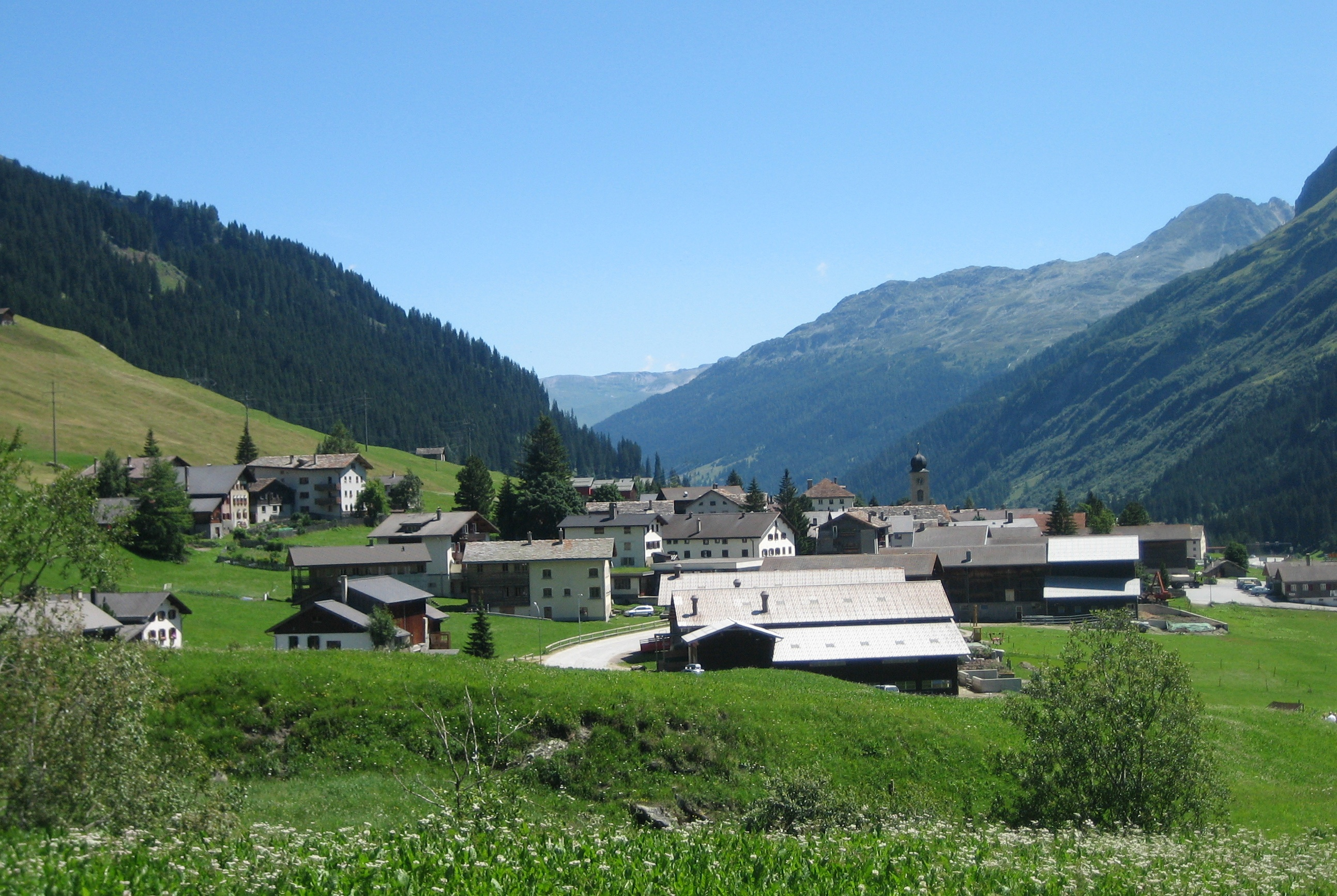

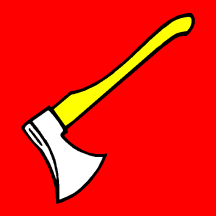
- Flag Coat of arms
- Location of Nufenen
- Location within Switzerland Location within Canton of Graubünden
- Coordinates: 46°32′N 9°14′E
- Country: Switzerland
- Canton: Graubünden
- District: Viamala

Area
  - Total: 28.03 km^{2} (10.82 sq mi)
- Elevation: 1,569 m (5,148 ft)

Population (December 2020)
  - Total: 139
  - Density: 4.96/km^{2} (12.8/sq mi)
- Time zone: UTC+01:00 (CET)
  - Summer (DST): UTC+02:00 (CEST)
- Postal code: 7437
- SFOS number: 3693
- ISO 3166 code: CH-GR
- Surrounded by: Hinterrhein, Mesocco, Safien, Splügen, Vals
- Website: www.nufenen.ch

Nufenen (Italian: Novena, Romansh: Nueinas) is a former municipality in the Viamala Region in the Swiss canton of Graubünden. On 1 January 2019 the former municipalities of Hinterrhein, Nufenen and Splügen merged to form the new municipality of Rheinwald.

== History ==
Nufenen was first mentioned in 1343 as Ovena. In 1633 it was mentioned as Nufena. In Romansh it was known as Nueinas and it used to be known as Novena in Italian.

== Geography ==
Nufenen has an area, as of 2006, of 28.1 km^{2} (10.8 sq mi). Of this area, 54.9% is used for agricultural purposes, while 14.8% is forested. Of the rest of the land, 0.9% is settled (buildings or roads) and the remainder (29.5%) is non-productive (rivers, glaciers or mountains).

Before 2017, the municipality was located in the Rheinwald sub-district, of the Hinterrhein district, after 2017 it was part of the Viamala Region. It is located on the San Bernardino tunnel road. It consists of the haufendorf (an irregular, unplanned and quite closely packed village, built around a central square) of Nufenen. Until the 18th Century, the village was surrounded by about fifteen farm house groups.

== Demographics ==
Nufenen has a population (as of 31 December 2020) of 139. As of 2008, 4.6% of the population was made up of foreign nationals. Over the last 10 years the population has grown at a rate of 10.2%.

As of 2000, the gender distribution of the population was 55.6% male and 44.4% female. The age distribution, as of 2000, in Nufenen is; 17 people or 13.4% of the population are between 0 and 9 years old. 4 people or 3.1% are 10 to 14, and 6 people or 4.7% are 15 to 19. Of the adult population, 18 people or 14.2% of the population are between 20 and 29 years old. 9 people or 7.1% are 30 to 39, 17 people or 13.4% are 40 to 49, and 25 people or 19.7% are 50 to 59. The senior population distribution is 8 people or 6.3% of the population are between 60 and 69 years old, 15 people or 11.8% are 70 to 79, there are 7 people or 5.5% who are 80 to 89, and there are 1 people or 0.8% who are 90 to 99.

In the 2007 federal election the most popular party was the SVP which received 61.7% of the vote. The next three most popular parties were the SPS (27.5%), the FDP (8.1%) and the CVP (2.3%).

In Nufenen about 71.4% of the population (between age 25-64) have completed either non-mandatory upper secondary education or additional higher education (either university or a Fachhochschule).

Nufenen has an unemployment rate of 0%. As of 2005, there were 43 people employed in the primary economic sector and about 15 businesses involved in this sector. 2 people are employed in the secondary sector and there is 1 business in this sector. 15 people are employed in the tertiary sector, with 3 businesses in this sector.

The historical population is given in the following table:

year	population
1781	366
1850	344
1900	206
1950	170
2000	127

== Languages ==
Most of the population (as of 2000) speak German (96.9%), with French being second most common ( 1.6%) and Italian being third ( 0.8%).

Languages in Nufenen
Languages	Census 1980		Census 1990		Census 2000	
Languages	Number	Percent	Number	Percent	Number	Percent
German	126	92.65%	115	95.04%	123	96.85%
Romansh	4	2.94%	0	0.00%	0	0.00%
Italian	4	2.94%	0	0.00%	1	0.79%
Population	136	100%	121	100%	127	100%
