= Flerden =

- Municipality
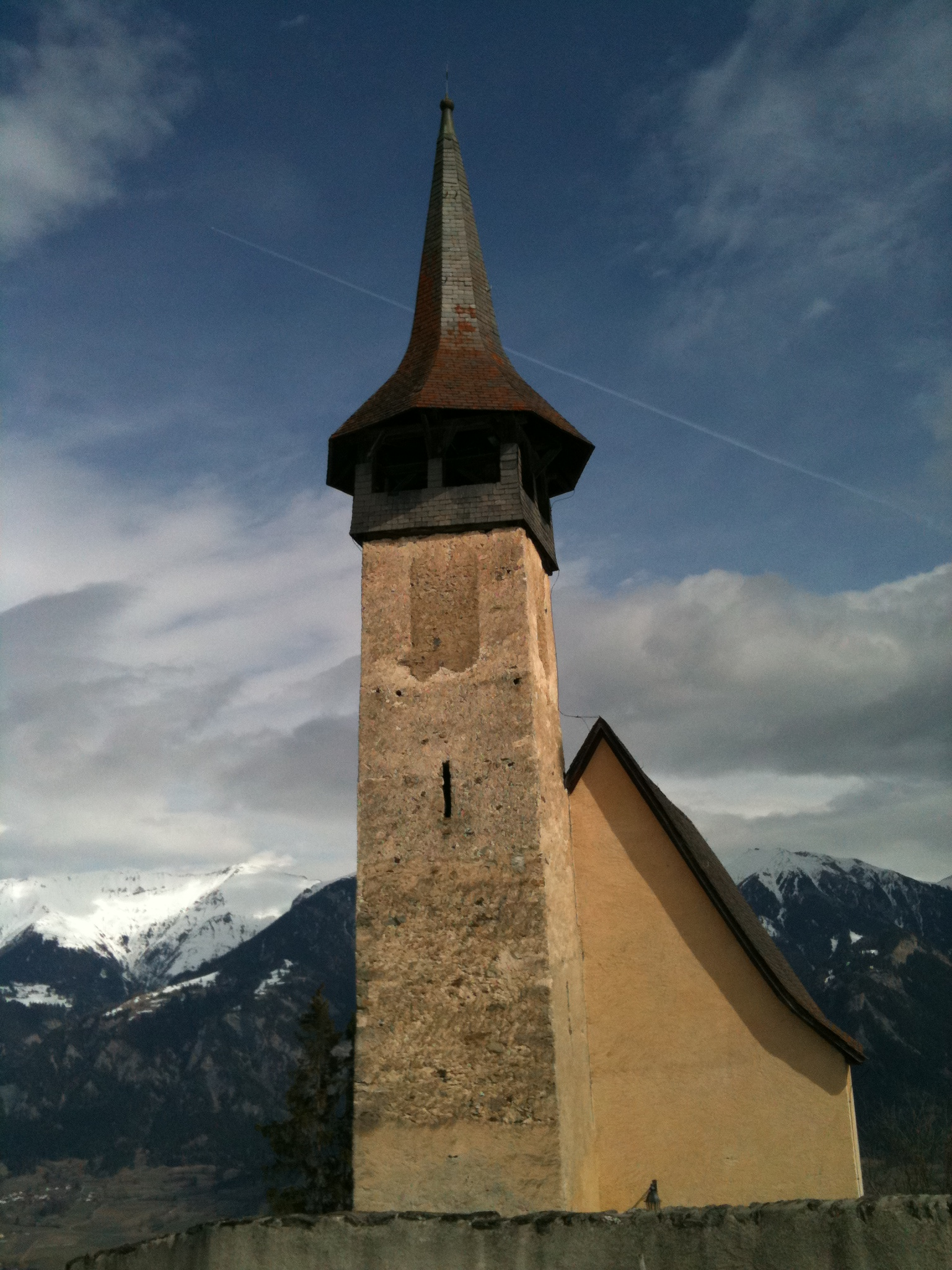

- Flag Coat of arms
- Location of Flerden
- Location within Switzerland Location within Canton of Grisons
- Coordinates: 46°42′N 9°24′E
- Country: Switzerland
- Canton: Grisons
- District: Viamala

Government
  - Mayor: Kasper Marugg

Area
  - Total: 6.09 km^{2} (2.35 sq mi)
- Elevation: 1,231 m (4,039 ft)

Population (December 2020)
  - Total: 247
  - Density: 40.6/km^{2} (105/sq mi)
- Time zone: UTC+01:00 (CET)
  - Summer (DST): UTC+02:00 (CEST)
- Postal code: 7426
- SFOS number: 3662
- ISO 3166 code: CH-GR
- Surrounded by: Masein, Portein, Safien, Tschappina, Urmein
- Website: www.flerden.ch

Flerden (Romansh: Flearda) is a municipality in the Viamala Region in the Swiss canton of the Grisons.

== History ==
Flerden is first mentioned in 1156 as Flirden.

== Geography ==
Flerden has an area, as of 2006, of 6.1 km^{2} (2.4 sq mi). Of this area, 54.6% is used for agricultural purposes, while 30% is forested. Of the rest of the land, 3.6% is settled (buildings or roads) and the remainder (11.7%) is non-productive (rivers, glaciers or mountains).

Before 2017, the municipality was located in the Thusis sub-district, of the Hinterrhein district, after 2017 it was part of the Viamala Region. It consists of the haufendorf (an irregular, unplanned and quite closely packed village, built around a central square) of Flerden on the inner Heinzenberg at an elevation of 1,234 m (4,049 ft).

== Demographics ==
Flerden has a population (as of 31 December 2020) of 247. As of 2008, 2.0% of the population was made up of foreign nationals. Over the last 10 years the population has grown at a rate of 15.3%.

As of 2000, the gender distribution of the population was 49.5% male and 50.5% female. The age distribution, as of 2000, in Flerden is; 14 people or 8.8% of the population are between 0 and 9 years old. 22 people or 13.8% are 10 to 14, and 13 people or 8.1% are 15 to 19. Of the adult population, 9 people or 5.6% of the population are between 20 and 29 years old. 17 people or 10.6% are 30 to 39, 30 people or 18.8% are 40 to 49, and 21 people or 13.1% are 50 to 59. The senior population distribution is 12 people or 7.5% of the population are between 60 and 69 years old, 16 people or 10.0% are 70 to 79, there are 6 people or 3.8% who are 80 to 89.

In the 2007 federal election the most popular party was the SVP which received 47.6% of the vote. The next three most popular parties were the FDP (24.4%), the SPS (14%) and the CVP (12.7%).

The entire Swiss population is generally well educated. In Flerden about 81% of the population (between age 25-64) have completed either non-mandatory upper secondary education or additional higher education (either university or a Fachhochschule).

Flerden has an unemployment rate of 0.32%. As of 2005, there were 42 people employed in the primary economic sector and about 16 businesses involved in this sector. 3 people are employed in the secondary sector and there are 2 businesses in this sector. 15 people are employed in the tertiary sector, with 4 businesses in this sector.

The historical population is given in the following table:

year	population
1808	148
1850	122
1900	109
1950	150
1960	132
1970	105
1980	128
1990	158
2000	160

== Languages ==
Most of the population (as of 2000) speaks German (95.6%), with Romansh being second most common ( 3.8%) and Italian being third ( 0.6%).

Languages in Flerden
Languages	Census 1980		Census 1990		Census 2000	
Languages	Number	Percent	Number	Percent	Number	Percent
German	123	96.09%	157	99.37%	153	96.0%
Romanish	4	3.12%	1	0.63%	6	4.0%
Population	128	100%	158	100%	160	100%
