= Tschappina =

- Municipality
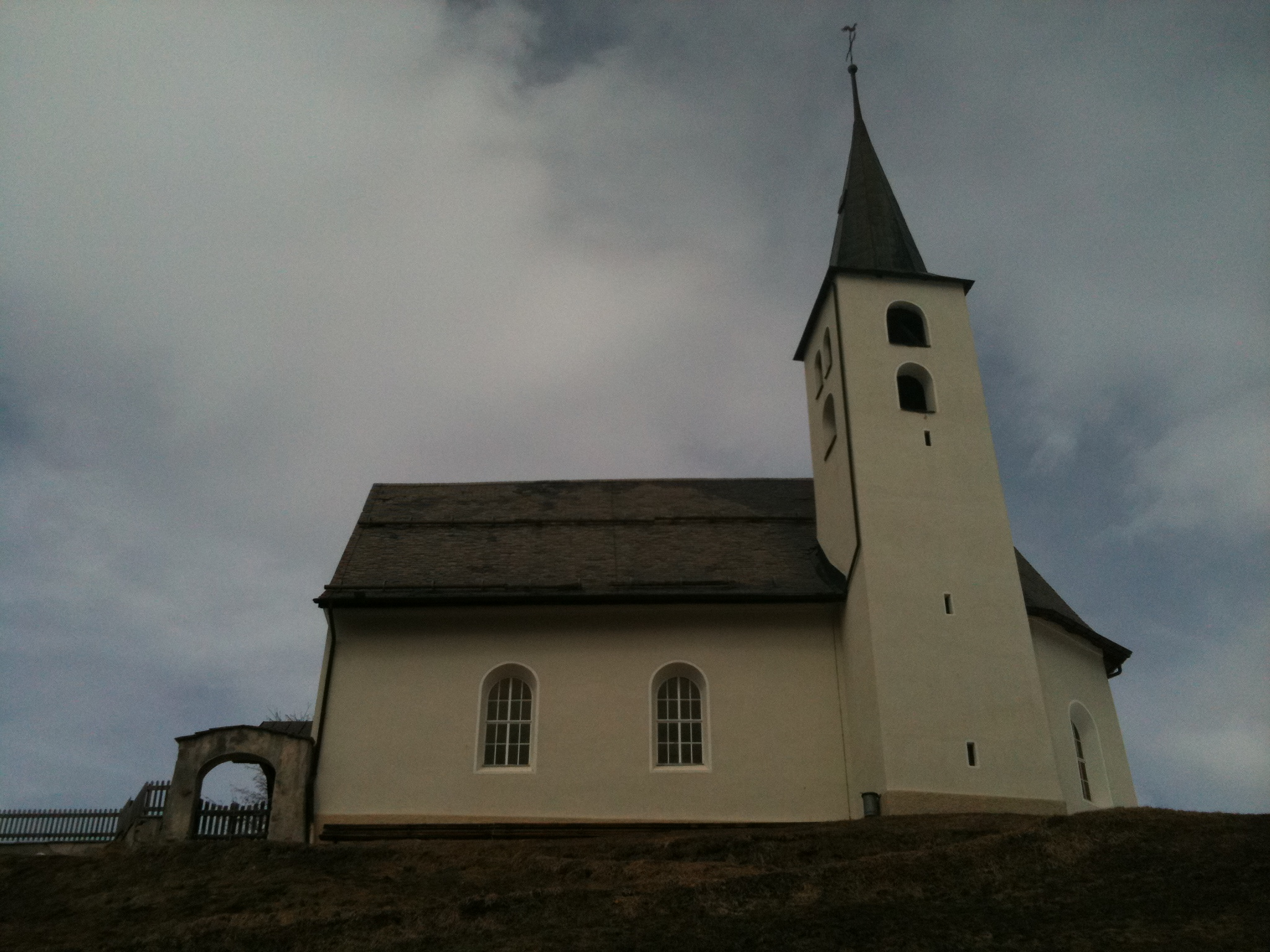

- Flag Coat of arms
- Location of Tschappina
- Location within Switzerland Location within Canton of Grisons
- Coordinates: 46°41′N 9°23′E
- Country: Switzerland
- Canton: Grisons
- District: Viamala

Area
  - Total: 24.67 km^{2} (9.53 sq mi)
- Elevation: 1,400 m (4,600 ft)

Population (December 2020)
  - Total: 134
  - Density: 5.43/km^{2} (14.1/sq mi)
- Time zone: UTC+01:00 (CET)
  - Summer (DST): UTC+02:00 (CEST)
- Postal code: 7428
- SFOS number: 3669
- ISO 3166 code: CH-GR
- Surrounded by: Flerden, Lohn, Mathon, Safien, Urmein
- Website: www.tschappina.ch

Tschappina is a municipality in the Viamala Region in the Swiss canton of the Grisons.

== History ==
Tschappina is first mentioned in 1396 as in Schipinen.

== Geography ==
Tschappina has an area, as of 2006, of 24.7 km^{2} (9.5 sq mi). Of this area, 42.2% is used for agricultural purposes, while 26.8% is forested. Of the rest of the land, 1% is settled (buildings or roads) and the remainder (30%) is non-productive (rivers, glaciers or mountains).

Before 2017, the municipality was located in the Thusis sub-district, of the Hinterrhein district, after 2017 it was part of the Viamala Region. It consists of scattered settlements over the upper Heinzenberg mountains, at an elevation of 1,384–1,846 meters (4,541–6,056 ft). It consists of the settlements of Unter- and Ober-Tschappina, Ober Gmeind, Usser and Inner Glas.

== Demographics ==
Tschappina has a population (as of 31 December 2020) of 134. As of 2008, 4.9% of the population was made up of foreign nationals. Over the last 10 years the population has decreased at a rate of -1.8%.

As of 2000, the gender distribution of the population was 53.1% male and 46.9% female. The age distribution, as of 2000, in Tschappina is; 20 people or 13.2% of the population are between 0 and 9 years old. 14 people or 9.3% are 10 to 14, and 7 people or 4.6% are 15 to 19. Of the adult population, 8 people or 5.3% of the population are between 20 and 29 years old. 21 people or 13.9% are 30 to 39, 24 people or 15.9% are 40 to 49, and 21 people or 13.9% are 50 to 59. The senior population distribution is 15 people or 9.9% of the population are between 60 and 69 years old, 10 people or 6.6% are 70 to 79, there are 10 people or 6.6% who are 80 to 89, and there is 1 person who is 90 to 99.

In the 2007 federal election the most popular party was the SVP which received 54.2% of the vote. The next three most popular parties were the SPS (16.4%), the FDP (12.6%) and the CVP (9.3%).

In Tschappina about 71.6% of the population (between age 25–64) have completed either non-mandatory upper secondary education or additional higher education (either university or a Fachhochschule).

Tschappina has an unemployment rate of 0.39%. As of 2005, there were 54 people employed in the primary economic sector and about 23 businesses involved in this sector. 4 people are employed in the secondary sector and there are 2 businesses in this sector. 19 people are employed in the tertiary sector, with 7 businesses in this sector.

The historical population is given in the following table:

| year | population |
|---|---|
| 1803 | 330 |
| 1850 | 251 |
| 1900 | 209 |
| 1950 | 209 |
| 2000 | 151 |

== Languages ==
Most of the population (as of 2000) speaks German (98.0%), with Romansh being second most common ( 1.3%) and Portuguese being third ( 0.7%).

Languages in Tschappina
| Languages | Census 1980 | | Census 1990 | | Census 2000 | |
| Languages | Number | Percent | Number | Percent | Number | Percent |
|---|---|---|---|---|---|---|
| German | 151 | 96.79% | 138 | 98.57% | 148 | 98.01% |
| Romansh | 3 | 1.92% | 2 | 1.43% | 2 | 1.32% |
| Population | 156 | 100% | 140 | 100% | 151 | 100% |
