= Hinterrhein, Switzerland =

Hinterrhein
- Municipality
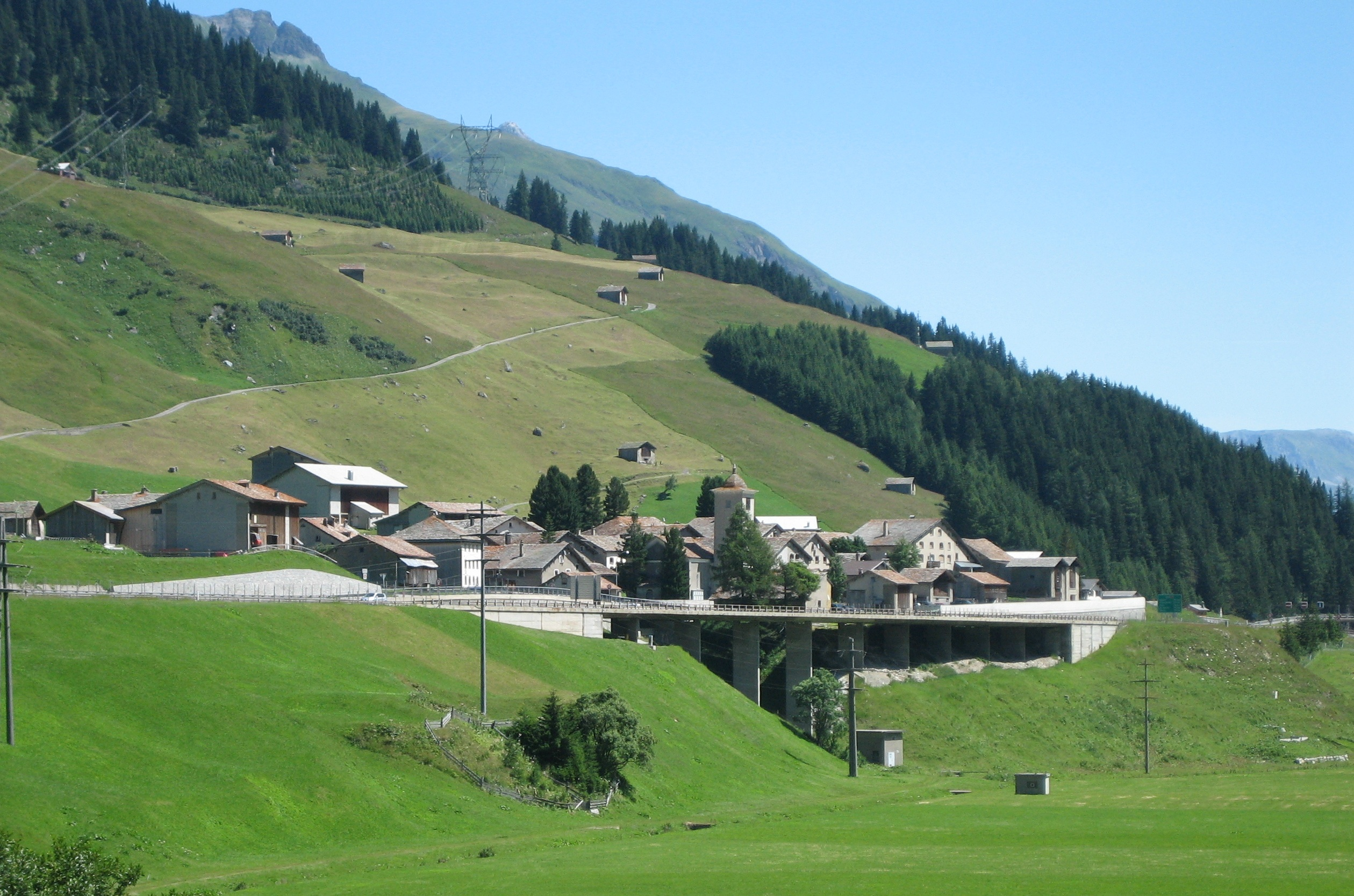

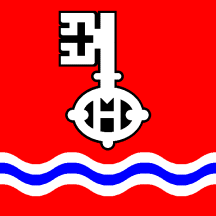
- Flag Coat of arms
- Location of Hinterrhein
- Location within Switzerland Location within Canton of Graubünden
- Coordinates: 46°32′N 9°12′E
- Country: Switzerland
- Canton: Graubünden
- District: Viamala

Area
  - Total: 48.3 km^{2} (18.6 sq mi)
- Elevation (Kirche Hinterrhein): 1,620 m (5,310 ft)

Population (December 2020)
  - Total: 61
  - Density: 1.3/km^{2} (3.3/sq mi)
- Time zone: UTC+01:00 (CET)
  - Summer (DST): UTC+02:00 (CEST)
- Postal code: 7438
- SFOS number: 3691
- ISO 3166 code: CH-GR
- Surrounded by: Blenio (TI), Malvaglia (TI), Mesocco, Nufenen, Vals
- Website: hinterrhein.ch

Hinterrhein (Romansh: Valragn) is a village and a former municipality in the Viamala Region in the Swiss canton of Graubünden. The village is located near the start of the river Hinterrhein/Rein Posteriur, one of the two initial tributaries of the Rhine. On 1 January 2019 the former municipalities of Hinterrhein, Nufenen and Splügen merged to form the new municipality of Rheinwald.

== History ==
Hinterrhein is first mentioned in 1219 as de Reno.

== Geography ==
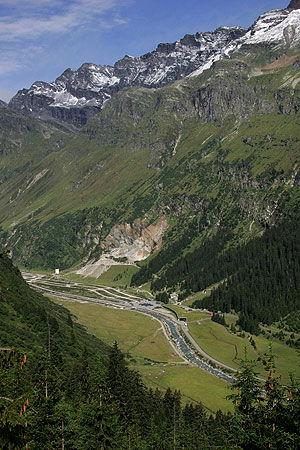
The river Hinterrhein near Hinterrhein

Hinterrhein has an area, as of 2006, of 48.4 km^{2} (18.7 sq mi). Of this area, 22.7% is used for agricultural purposes, while 7.6% is forested. Of the rest of the land, 1.2% is settled (buildings or roads) and the remainder (68.5%) is non-productive (rivers, glaciers or mountains).

Before 2017, the municipality was located in the Rheinwald sub-district, of the Hinterrhine district, after 2017 it was part of the Viamala Region. It is a haufendorf (an irregular, unplanned and quite closely packed village, built around a central square) located on the northern portal of the San Bernardino tunnel.

== Demographics ==
Hinterrhein has a population (as of 31 December 2020) of 61. As of 2008, 6.4% of the population was made up of foreign nationals. Over the last 10 years the population has stayed stable.

As of 2000, the gender distribution of the population was 57.7% male and 42.3% female. The age distribution, as of 2000, in Hinterrhein is; 9 people or 8.6% of the population are between 0 and 9 years old. 2 people or 1.9% are 10 to 14, and 6 people or 5.7% are 15 to 19. Of the adult population, 14 people or 13.3% of the population are between 20 and 29 years old. 19 people or 18.1% are 30 to 39, 19 people or 18.1% are 40 to 49, and 11 people or 10.5% are 50 to 59. The senior population distribution is 14 people or 13.3% of the population are between 60 and 69 years old, 9 people or 8.6% are 70 to 79, there are 2 people or 1.9% who are 80 to 89.

In the 2007 federal election the most popular party was the SVP which received 76.6% of the vote. The next three most popular parties were the FDP (12.3%), the SPS (6.5%) and the CVP (4.5%).

In Hinterrhein about 44.8% of the population (between age 25-64) have completed either non-mandatory upper secondary education or additional higher education (either university or a Fachhochschule).

Hinterrhein has an unemployment rate of 0.36%. As of 2005, there were 28 people employed in the primary economic sector and about 12 businesses involved in this sector. 2 people are employed in the secondary sector and there is 1 business in this sector. 11 people are employed in the tertiary sector, with 4 businesses in this sector.

The historical population is given in the following table:

year	population
1781	171
1850	163
1900	147
1950	94
1960	86
1970	77
1980	75
1990	68
2000	105

== Languages ==
Most of the population (as of 2000) speaks German (75.2%), with Italian being second most common (14.3%) and Portuguese being third ( 5.7%).

Languages in Hinterrhein
Languages	Census 1980		Census 1990		Census 2000	
Languages	Number	Percent	Number	Percent	Number	Percent
German	75	100%	66	97.06%	-	75.2%
Romansh	0	0.00%	1	1.47%	-	1.0%
Italian	0	0.00%	1	1.47%	-	14.3%
Total	75	100%	68	100%	105	100%

== Heritage sites of national significance ==
The Alte Landbrücke (Old Bridge) is listed as a Swiss heritage sites of national significance.

== Climate ==
Between 1961 and 1990 Hinterrhein had an average of 121.4 days of rain per year and on average received 1,469 mm (57.8 in) of precipitation. The wettest month was May during which time Hinterrhein received an average of 194 mm (7.6 in) of precipitation. During this month there was precipitation for an average of 14.2 days. The driest month of the year was February with an average of 45 mm (1.8 in) of precipitation over 14.2 days.

Climate data for Hinterrhein (1981-2010)
Month	Jan	Feb	Mar	Apr	May	Jun	Jul	Aug	Sep	Oct	Nov	Dec	Year
Mean daily maximum °C (°F)	−1.5 (29.3)	−0.6 (30.9)	2.6 (36.7)	5.6 (42.1)	11.2 (52.2)	15.3 (59.5)	18.1 (64.6)	17.5 (63.5)	13.6 (56.5)	9.6 (49.3)	3.0 (37.4)	−0.8 (30.6)	7.8 (46.0)
Daily mean °C (°F)	−6.3 (20.7)	−5.8 (21.6)	−2.1 (28.2)	1.6 (34.9)	6.5 (43.7)	10.0 (50.0)	12.5 (54.5)	12.0 (53.6)	8.5 (47.3)	4.6 (40.3)	−1.2 (29.8)	−5.0 (23.0)	2.9 (37.2)
Mean daily minimum °C (°F)	−11.6 (11.1)	−11.9 (10.6)	−7.4 (18.7)	−2.7 (27.1)	1.8 (35.2)	4.3 (39.7)	6.4 (43.5)	6.5 (43.7)	3.5 (38.3)	0.1 (32.2)	−5.3 (22.5)	−9.6 (14.7)	−2.2 (28.0)
Average precipitation mm (inches)	50 (2.0)	37 (1.5)	65 (2.6)	137 (5.4)	197 (7.8)	175 (6.9)	171 (6.7)	184 (7.2)	186 (7.3)	179 (7.0)	150 (5.9)	67 (2.6)	1,598 (62.9)
Average snowfall cm (inches)	80.1 (31.5)	63 (25)	71.4 (28.1)	66.5 (26.2)	13.2 (5.2)	8.6 (3.4)	0.2 (0.1)	1.1 (0.4)	3.7 (1.5)	17.8 (7.0)	42.7 (16.8)	68.8 (27.1)	437.1 (172.1)
Average precipitation days (≥ 1.0 mm)	6.7	5.6	7.2	10.1	13.0	12.4	11.8	12.2	9.4	9.7	8.8	7.2	114.1
Average snowy days (≥ 1.0 cm)	8.9	8.4	8.1	7.1	2.1	0.8	0.1	0.2	0.5	1.8	5.8	9	52.8
Average relative humidity (%)	73	72	72	73	73	73	73	76	77	76	76	75	74
Mean monthly sunshine hours	59	94	117	112	149	166	193	174	128	103	58	39	1,391
Source: MeteoSwiss
