= Sufers =

- Municipality
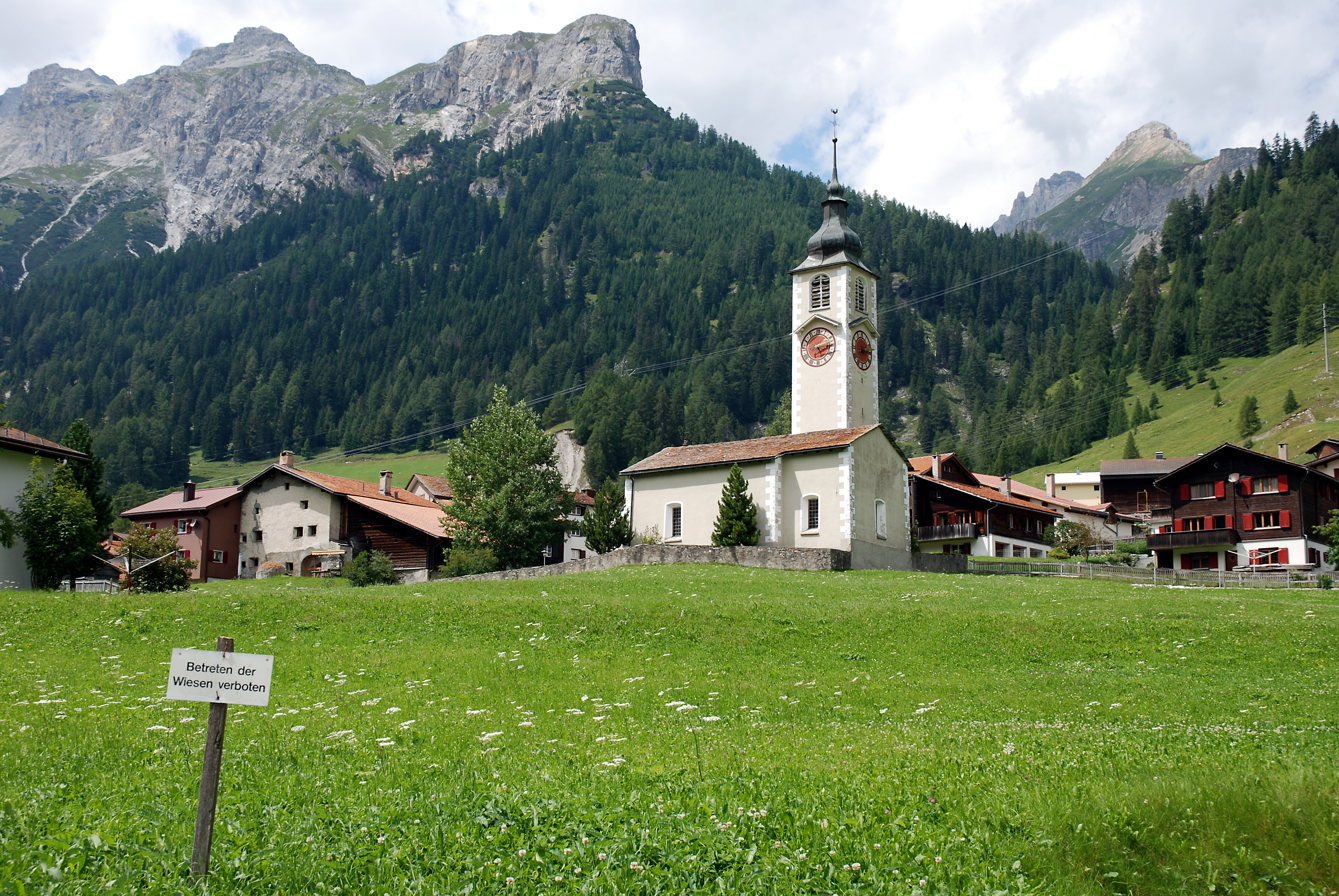

- Flag Coat of arms
- Location of Sufers
- Location within Switzerland Location within Canton of Grisons
- Coordinates: 46°34′N 9°22′E
- Country: Switzerland
- Canton: Grisons
- District: Viamala

Government
  - Mayor: Thomas Lechner

Area
  - Total: 34.629 km^{2} (13.370 sq mi)
- Elevation: 1,430 m (4,690 ft)

Population (December 2020)
  - Total: 146
  - Density: 4.22/km^{2} (10.9/sq mi)
- Time zone: UTC+01:00 (CET)
  - Summer (DST): UTC+02:00 (CEST)
- Postal code: 7434
- SFOS number: 3695
- ISO 3166 code: CH-GR
- Surrounded by: Andeer, Casti-Wergenstein, Ferrera, Madesimo (IT-SO), Safien, Splügen
- Website: www.sufers.ch

Sufers (Romansh: Sur) is a municipality in the Viamala Region in the Swiss canton of the Grisons.

== History ==
Sufers is first mentioned in 831 as Subere.

== Geography ==
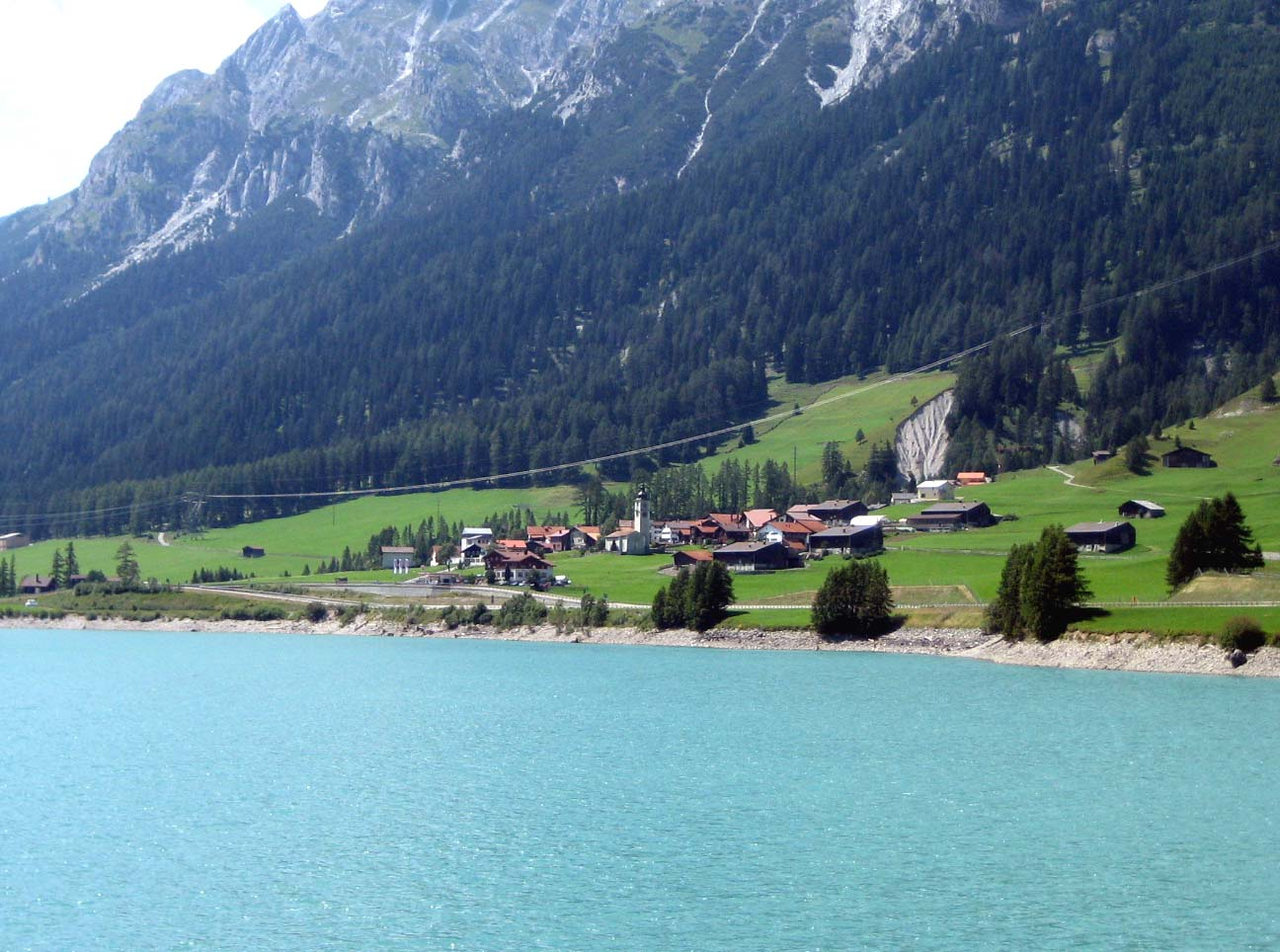
Sufers on Sufnersee

Sufers has an area, as of 2006, of 34.6 km^{2} (13.4 sq mi). Of this area, 13.4% is used for agricultural purposes, while 23.8% is forested. Of the rest of the land, 1.2% is settled (buildings or roads) and the remainder (61.6%) is non-productive (rivers, glaciers or mountains).

Before 2017, the municipality was located in the Rheinwald sub-district, of the Hinterrhein district, after 2017 it was part of the Viamala Region. It is a Haufendorf (an irregular, unplanned and quite closely packed village, built around a central square).

A dam on the Hinterrhein river was built in 1962 and forms the reservoir Sufnersee.

== Demographics ==
Sufers has a population (as of 31 December 2020) of 146. As of 2008, 3.1% of the population was made up of foreign nationals. Over the last 10 years the population has decreased at a rate of -6.6%.

As of 2000, the gender distribution of the population was 52.0% male and 48.0% female. The age distribution, as of 2000, in Sufers is; 14 people or 12.2% of the population are between 0 and 9 years old. 11 people or 9.6% are 10 to 14, and 4 people or 3.5% are 15 to 19. Of the adult population, 11 people or 9.6% of the population are between 20 and 29 years old. 18 people or 15.7% are 30 to 39, 10 people or 8.7% are 40 to 49, and 17 people or 14.8% are 50 to 59. The senior population distribution is 12 people or 10.4% of the population are between 60 and 69 years old, 10 people or 8.7% are 70 to 79, there are 8 people or 7.0% who are 80 to 89.

In the 2007 federal election the most popular party was the SVP which received 57.3% of the vote. The next two most popular parties were the FDP (19.3%) and the CVP (2.1%).

In Sufers about 77.9% of the population (between age 25-64) have completed either non-mandatory upper secondary education or additional higher education (either university or a Fachhochschule).

Sufers has an unemployment rate of 0.29%. As of 2005, there were 26 people employed in the primary economic sector and about 9 businesses involved in this sector. 12 people are employed in the secondary sector and there are 3 businesses in this sector. 27 people are employed in the tertiary sector, with 7 businesses in this sector.

The historical population is given in the following table:

year	population
1690	186
1807	224
1850	184
1900	104
1950	124
2000	115
2010	126

== Languages ==
Most of the population (as of 2000) speaks German (91.3%), with Serbo-Croatian being second most common ( 4.3%) and Romansh being third ( 3.5%).

Languages in Sufers
Languages	Census 1980		Census 1990		Census 2000	
Languages	Number	Percent	Number	Percent	Number	Percent
German	105	92.11%	104	93.69%	105	91.30%
Romansh	3	2.63%	1	0.90%	4	3.48%
Population	114	100%	111	100%	115	100%
