= Anton Aberle =

German–Swiss architect

Anton Aberle (14 November 1876, in Möhringen – 15 August 1953, in Thusis) was a German–Swiss architect.

A Schwarzwald farmer's son, he grew up studying at the Bauhochschule Karlsruhe and in 1904 founded the architectural firm Robert Curjel und Karl Moser (Curjel and Moser). After managing the construction of a hotel in Feldberg, in 1906 he was sent to St. Gallen, where business office buildings emerged under his leadership.

In 1909, he started his own business. In addition to various business houses and embroidery factories in St. Gallen, he primarily designed single-family homes in 1920–1921 on the Stahlskelettbau. Aberle built a villa in St Gallen in 1930 and in 1933 he built the first all-steel frame bridge in the town.

== Literature ==
- Isabelle Rucki, Dorothee Huber (Hrsg.): Architektenlexikon der Schweiz, 19./20. Jahrhundert. Birkhäuser, Basel 1998, ISBN 3-7643-5261-2.
- Stanislaus von Moos et al.: Das Neue Bauen in der Ostschweiz. Ein Inventar. Schweizerischer Werkbund, Sektion Ostschweiz, St. Gallen 1989, ISBN 3-908118-01-8.
