= Luzia Hartsuyker-Curjel =

Dutch architect (1926–2011)

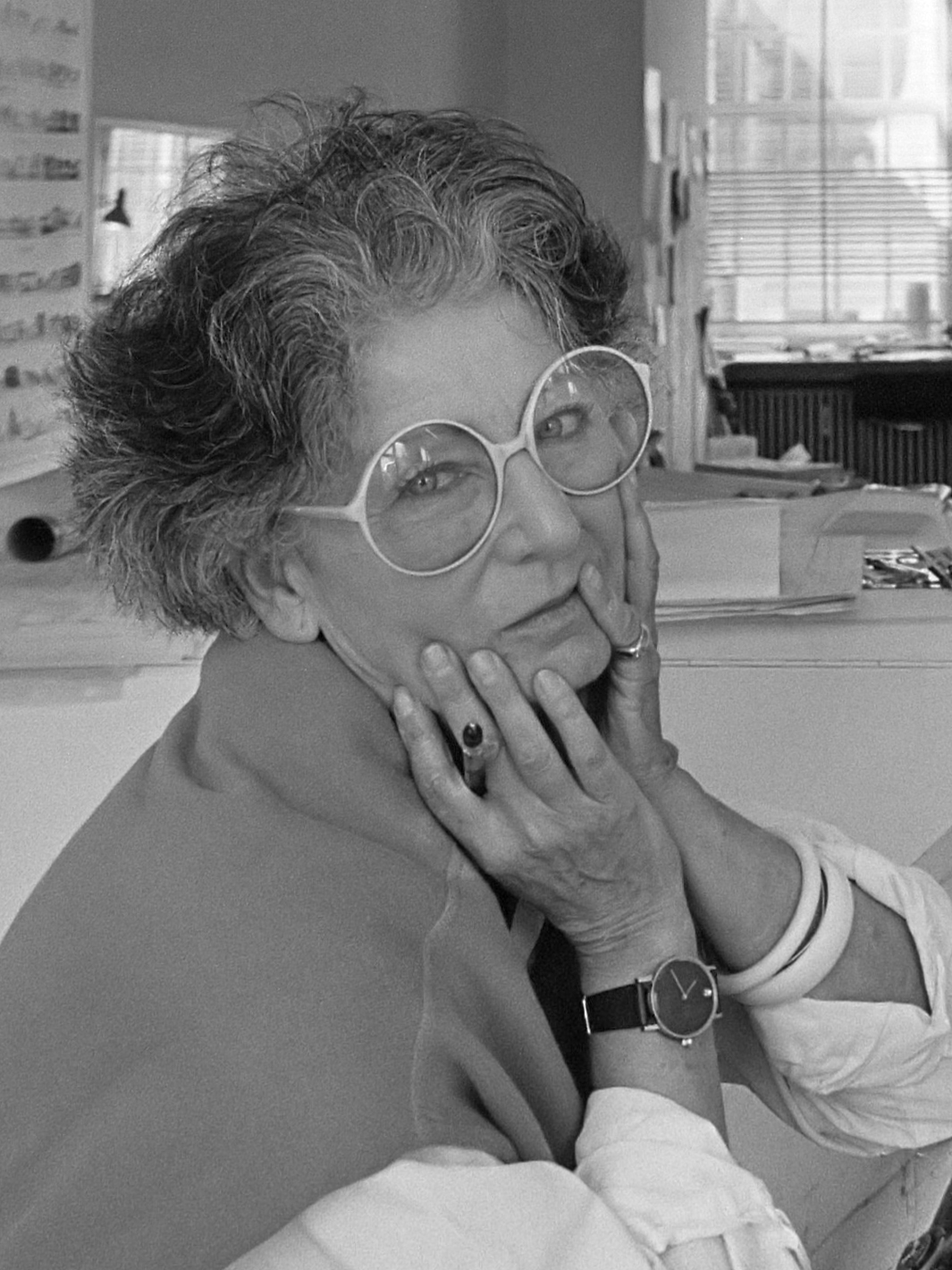
- Luzia Hartsuyker-Curjel (1987)
- Born: 15 February 1926; Karlsruhe
- Died: 17 April 2011 (aged 85); Laren, North Holland
- Education: ETH Zurich
- Occupation: Architect
- Spouse: Enrico Hartsuyker

Luzia Hartsuyker-Curjel (15 February 1926 – 17 April 2011) was a Dutch architect of German origin. She is remembered for her innovative designs and for her collaboration with the Italian-born Dutch architect Enrico Hartsuyker. Considerable attention was paid to their Biopolis project, a satellite city planned for The Hague but never realized.

== Early life and education ==
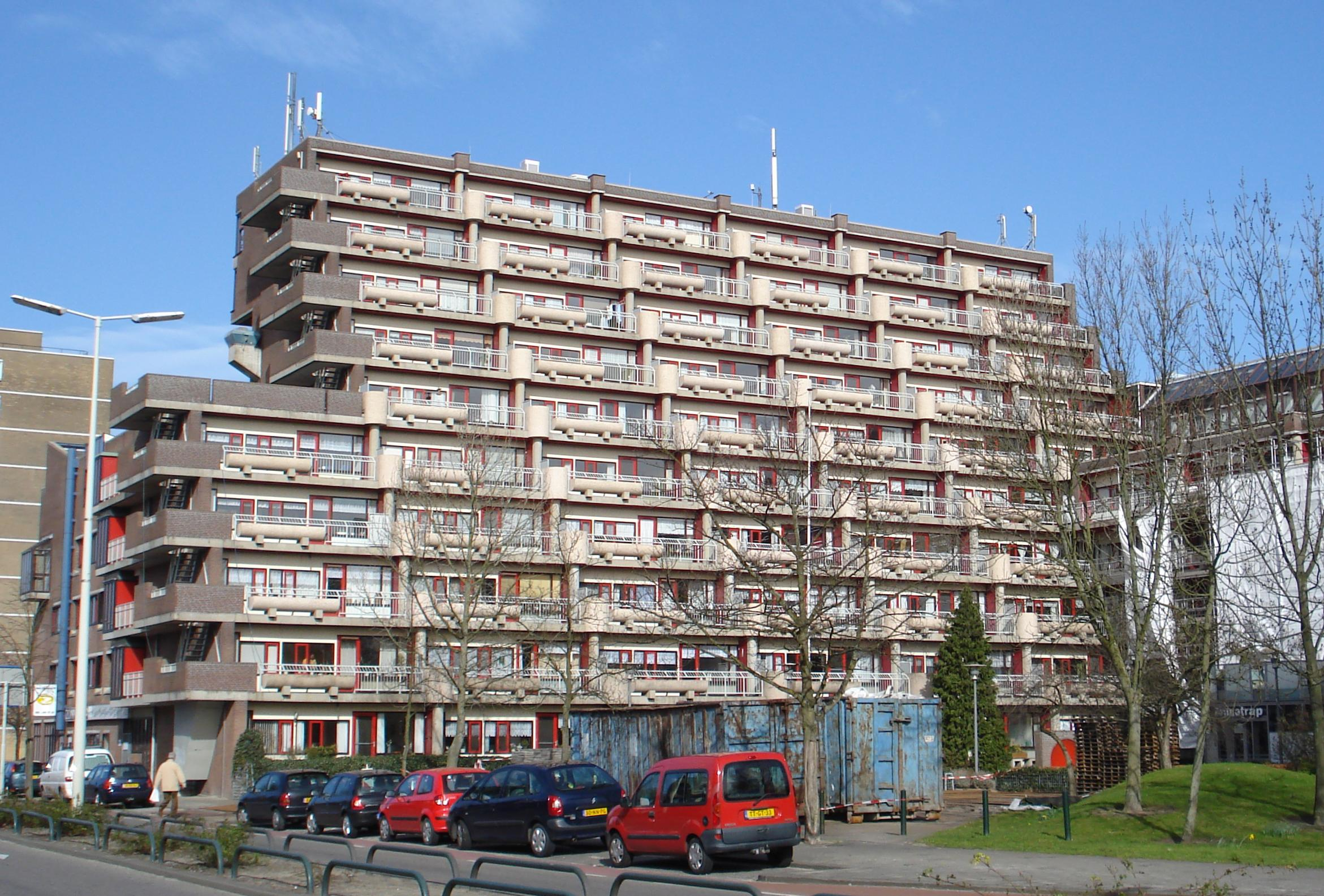
The Zonnetrap Center, Rotterdam (1980)

Hartsuyker-Curjel was born in 1926 in Karlsruhe, Germany. Her father, Hans Curjel, the son of the architect Robert Curjel, was an art historian and pianist. Her mother, Gabriella Fahrner had also studied music and played the cello. As her parents were Jewish, the family moved to Switzerland when she was six years old. She studied architecture at the ETH Zurich where she met the Dutch Italian architecture student and future husband Enrico Hartsuyker. They were encouraged in their studies by Siegfried Giedion, a close friend of her father, Hans Curjel.

== Career ==
In 1953, the couple settled in the Netherlands. From the 1960s, they received large commissions for reconstruction work in Amsterdam and Arnhem. Their atrium housing developments in Amsterdam-Buitenveldert (1965) contributed to their evolving reputation. Their social housing designs included alternative layouts with new spatial options, often with a central patio and slight differences in room levels. The kitchens and bathrooms were often centrally located.

Their urban planning models, Biopolis and Hydropolis, draw considerable attention as they were aimed at integrating various functions in a building development. While these two projects were not realized, their approach can be seen in the Zonnetrap old people's centre in Rotterdam (1980) which in addition to residential accommodation provided for stores, small businesses and workshops, attracting a variety of people to the neighbourhood, not just the old people. The concept continues to be appreciated today.

In the 1980s, Luzia Hartsuyker became known for her "women-friendly" homes, overcoming the traditionally hierarchical designs with rooms of more equal sizes. Examples can be seen in Amsterdam, Apeldoorn and IJsselstein.

Luzia Hartsuyker-Curjel died on 17 April 2011 in Laren.

== Literature ==
- Moorsel, Wies van; Segaar-Höweler, Dorothee C. (2008). Enrico Hartsuyker en Luzia Hartsuyker-Curjel: modellen voor nieuwe woonvormen. Stichting Bonas. ISBN 978-90-76643-32-8.
