= Curjel & Moser =

German architecture company

Curjel and Moser
- Type: Architectural firm
- Industry: Architecture
- Founded: 1888
- Defunct: 1915
- Headquarters: Karlsruhe, Germany
- Key people: Robert Curjel and Karl Moser

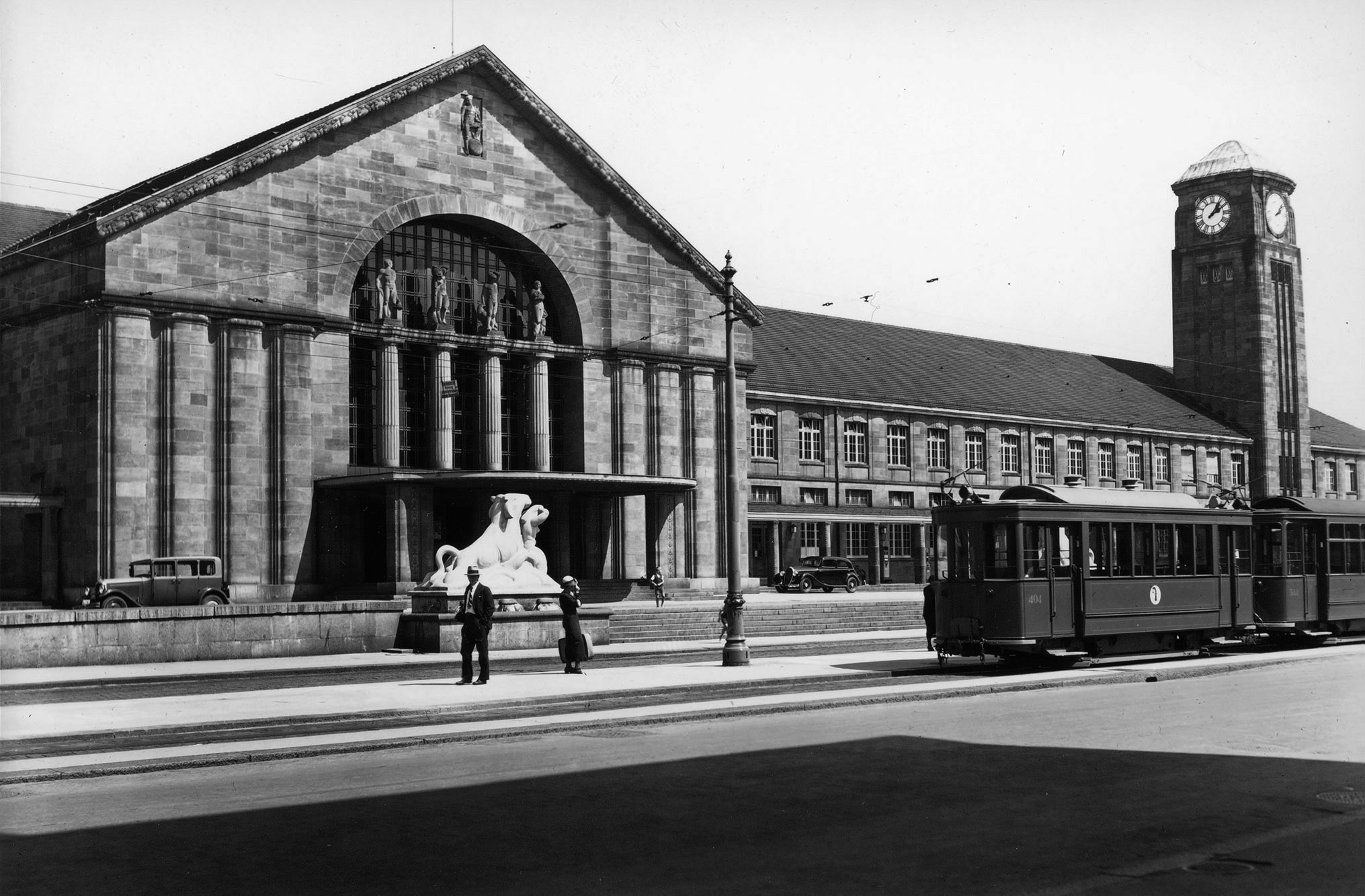
Badischer Bahnhof in Basel

Curjel & Moser was an architectural firm set up by Robert Curjel and Karl Moser in 1888 in Karlsruhe, Germany. They designed about 400 buildings in Germany and Switzerland. In 1915, following the start of the World War I, the firm was dissolved and Moser became professor at ETH Zurich. Many of the office's surviving buildings are now listed monuments. In Karlsruhe-Knielingen, Curjel-und-Moser-Strasse was named after the architects in 2008.

== Buildings designed ==
- St John's Church in Bern (1892–93)
- St. Sebastian in Wettingen (1895)
- St Paul's Church in Basel (1898–1901)
- Rheinlust in Rheinfelden (1899–1900)
- St. Paul's Church, Bern (1902–1905)
- Kunsthaus Zürich (1904–1910)
- Badischer Bahnhof in Basel (1910–1913)
- University of Zürich (1911–1914)
- Concert hall in Karlsruhe (1913–1915)
