= Oberurmein =

Ski station in the Heinzenberg-Domlschlag area, in Canton Graubünden, Switzerland

Coordinates: 46.701°N 9.385°E

Oberurmein is a small ski station situated at an elevation of 1,579 metres (5,180 ft) above sea level in the Heinzenberg-Domlschlag area, within Canton Graubünden, Switzerland. It is administratively part of the municipality of Urmein, located approximately 6 kilometres (3.7 mi) away.

== Geography ==
Oberurmein is located in the Viamala Region of Canton Graubünden, nestled in the Swiss Alps. The area is renowned for its serene alpine environment and picturesque landscapes, making it a favored destination for winter sports enthusiasts and nature lovers.

== Ski Facilities ==
Oberurmein is part of the Tschappina/Urmein (Heinzenberg) ski resort, which offers a variety of slopes suitable for different skill levels. A notable feature is the Kinderland Oberurmein, equipped with a people mover installed in 2004, designed specifically for children and beginners learning to ski. The resort provides a family-friendly atmosphere with well-maintained facilities.

== Tourism ==
The ski station attracts visitors seeking a tranquil and family-oriented skiing experience. Its proximity to Urmein allows tourists to explore local culture and traditions. Additionally, the natural ice rink on the Patrutgsee in Oberurmein, situated at 1,609 meters above sea level, is a popular attraction open daily from Christmas until early March, offering ice skating amidst scenic surroundings.

== Access ==
Oberurmein is accessible by road from the town of Urmein. During winter months, it is advisable for vehicles to be equipped for snowy conditions. Public transportation options include the PostBus service, which connects to Oberurmein; schedules can be checked via the Swiss Federal Railways (SBB) online timetable. A large, free car park is available at the ski lift for visitors arriving by car.
