= Heinrich Altherr =

Swiss painter

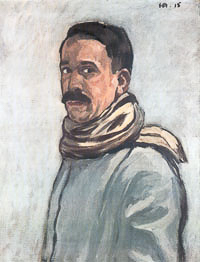
Self-portrait (1915)

Heinrich Altherr (11 April 1878, in Basel – 27 April 1947, in Zürich) was a Swiss painter. He is best known for his murals in churches and various public buildings.

== Biography ==
His father, Alfred, was a pastor. He had his first art lessons from a family friend, the sculptor Carl Burckhardt. Later, he studied with Fritz Schider and, after failing the entrance exam for the Academy of Fine Arts, Munich, with Heinrich Knirr at his private school there. A trip to Italy confirmed his preference for dark, northern colors over the bright Mediterranean palette. French Impressionism also had little appeal for him, as he found himself attracted to Expressionism instead. He initially focused on portraits and landscapes.

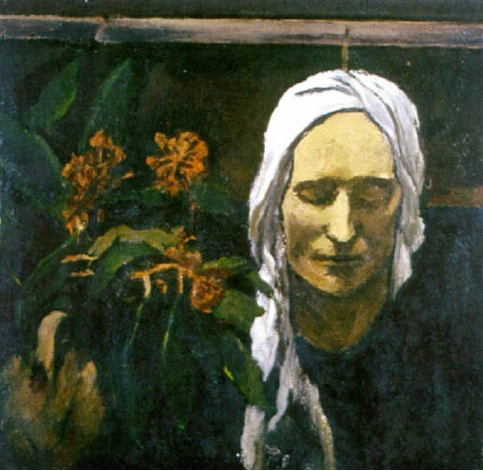
Tragic Still-Life

He was one of the first members of the Deutscher Künstlerbund. In 1906, he became a teacher at the Academy of Fine Arts, Karlsruhe. During this period, he created frescoes and stained glass windows for churches in Darmstadt, Basel, Karlsruhe, Elberfeld and Zürich. He also made the acquaintance of the architect Karl Moser, who was instrumental in obtaining several large commissions.

In 1913, he moved to the State Academy of Fine Arts Stuttgart, where he had been appointed a Professor. He married Wilhelmine Fauser in 1917. From 1919 to 1921 he served as its director. He was one of the founders of the Stuttgart Succession in 1923 and served as its first Chairman. His primary subject was composition and he remained there until 1939. He was an active campaigner against superficial fashions in the fine arts and opposed the official styles promoted by National Socialist policy.

Eventually, he ran afoul of those policies and his works were declared to be "Entartete Kunst" (degenerate). In 1938, several of his paintings were confiscated and destroyed. In consideration of his students, he remained at the school until 1939, but the outbreak of war forced him to return to Switzerland. His last work in Germany was a monumental religious mural for the Friedenskirche in Heilbronn, depicting Jesus flanked by unbelievers on one side and the faithful on the other. It was destroyed during a bombing raid in 1944. The Städtische Museen Heilbronn are in possession of sketches and models for the mural, so some record of it remains.

From 1941 to 1946, he created several major mural cycles at the State Archives of Basel and the Friedhof am Hörnli.
