= Thusis =

- Municipality
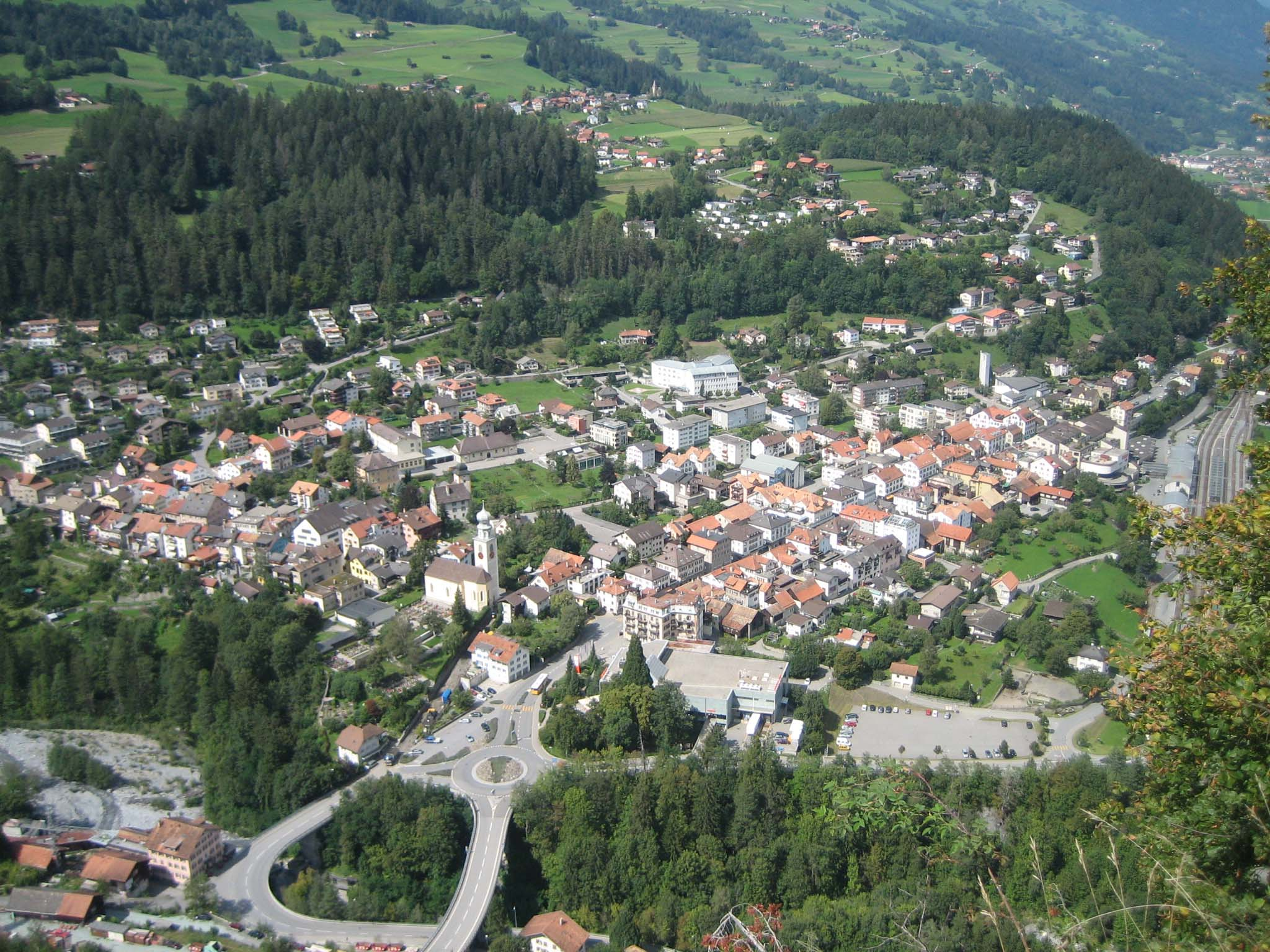

- Flag Coat of arms
- Location of Thusis
- Location within Switzerland Location within Canton of Grisons
- Coordinates: 46°41′46″N 9°26′22″E
- Country: Switzerland
- Canton: Grisons
- District: Viamala

Area
  - Total: 6.84 km^{2} (2.64 sq mi)
- Elevation: 720 m (2,360 ft)

Population (December 2020)
  - Total: 9,453
  - Density: 1,380/km^{2} (3,580/sq mi)
- Time zone: UTC+01:00 (CET)
  - Summer (DST): UTC+02:00 (CEST)
- Postal code: 7430
- SFOS number: 3668
- ISO 3166 code: CH-GR
- Surrounded by: Cazis, Fürstenau, Lohn, Masein, Rongellen, Sils im Domleschg, Urmein
- Website: www.thusis.ch

Thusis (Italian: Tosana, Romansh: Tusàn) is a municipality in the Viamala Region in the Swiss canton of the Grisons. On 1 January 2018 the former municipality of Mutten merged into the municipality of Thusis.

== History ==
Thusis is first mentioned in 1156 as Tosana. The town was devastated by more than 10 fires and after the one of 1845, it had to be rebuilt.

== Geography ==
Thusis has an area, as of 2006, of 6.8 km^{2} (2.6 sq mi). Of this area, 18% is used for agricultural purposes, while 58.2% is forested. Of the rest of the land, 15.2% is settled (buildings or roads) and the remainder (8.6%) is non-productive (rivers, glaciers or mountains). The municipality is the capital of the Thusis sub-district, of the Hinterrhein district, after 2017 it was part of the Viamala Region. It is the center of the Hinterrhein valley and is located at the confluence of the Hinterrhein and Nolla rivers. Thusis is also at the end of the Viamala canyon. It consists of the village of Thusis and, since 1875, includes Übernolla.

== Demographics ==
Thusis has a population (as of 31 December 2020) of 9,453. As of 2008, 23.6% of the population was made up of foreign nationals. Over the last 10 years the population has grown at a rate of 0.7%. In the town, the Swiss German dialect is predominant. Only 5% speak the local Romansh. The germanization is assumed to have begun in the 15th century, with people from the southern parts of Germany and the Wallis.

As of 2000, the gender distribution of the population was 50.4% male and 49.6% female. The age distribution, as of 2000, in Thusis is; 304 people or 11.2% of the population are between 0 and 9 years old. 142 people or 5.2% are 10 to 14, and 141 people or 5.2% are 15 to 19. Of the adult population, 354 people or 13.0% of the population are between 20 and 29 years old. 460 people or 16.9% are 30 to 39, 402 people or 14.8% are 40 to 49, and 333 people or 12.3% are 50 to 59. The senior population distribution is 255 people or 9.4% of the population are between 60 and 69 years old, 195 people or 7.2% are 70 to 79, there are 104 people or 3.8% who are 80 to 89, and there are 27 people or 1.0% who are 90 to 99. Thusis has an unemployment rate of 1.65%. As of 2005, there were 15 people employed in the primary economic sector and about 5 businesses involved in this sector. 525 people are employed in the secondary sector and there are 36 businesses in this sector. 1,325 people are employed in the tertiary sector, with 190 businesses in this sector.

The historical population is given in the following table:

year	population
1629	542
1850	769
1900	1,281
1950	1,616
2000	2,717
2025	3,453

== Politics ==
In the 2023 federal election the most popular party was the SVP which received 28.8% of the vote. The next three most popular parties were the SPS (21.5%), die Mitte (19.9%) FDP (17.2%).

The Mayor is Remi Crameri from the party die Mitte. He was elected in a by-election in April 2026.

== Education ==
In Thusis about 63.5% of the population (between age 25–64) have completed either non-mandatory upper secondary education or additional higher education (either university or a Fachhochschule).

== Religion ==
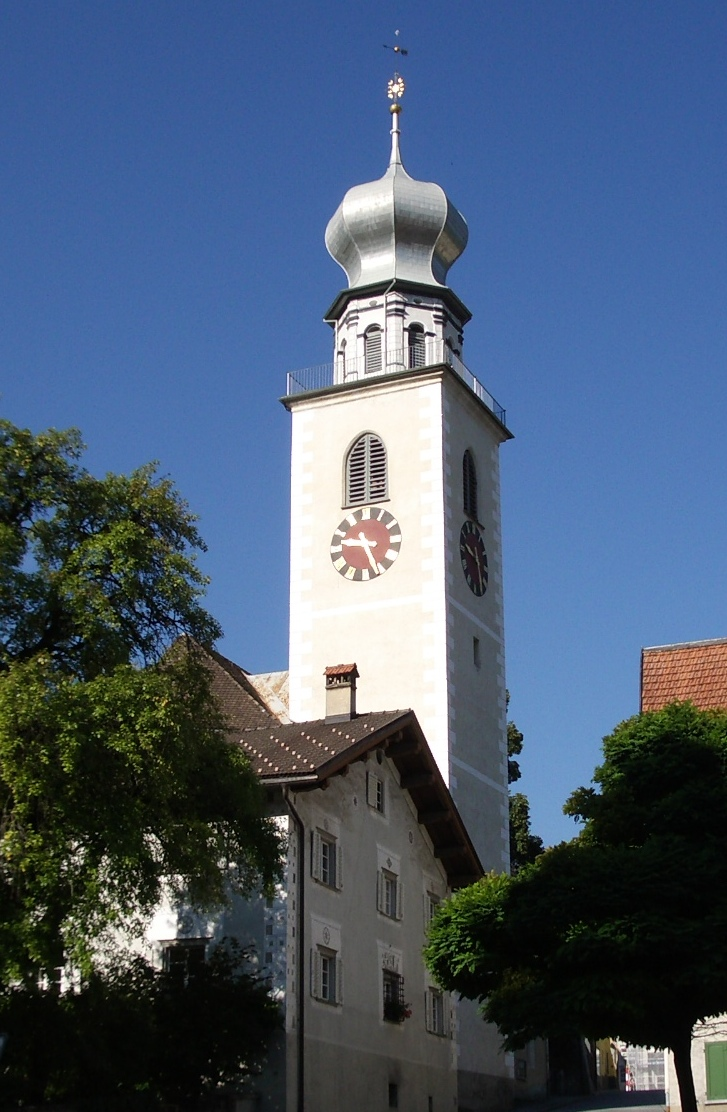
Protestant church in Thusis

From the 2000 census, 1,085 or 39.9% are Roman Catholic, while 1,096 or 40.3% belonged to the Swiss Reformed Church. Of the rest of the population, there are 134 individuals (or about 4.93% of the population) who belong to the Orthodox Church, and there are 46 individuals (or about 1.69% of the population) who belong to another Christian church. There are less than 5 individuals who are Jewish, and 96 (or about 3.53% of the population) who are Islamic. There are 64 individuals (or about 2.36% of the population) who belong to another church (not listed on the census), 101 (or about 3.72% of the population) belong to no church, are agnostic or atheist, and 95 individuals (or about 3.50% of the population) did not answer the question.

== Languages ==
Most of the population (as of 2000) speaks German (the local Swiss German dialect is known as Thusnerdeutsch) (77.7%), with Serbo-Croatian being second most common ( 5.2%) and Italian being third ( 4.7%).

Languages in Thusis GR
Languages	Census 1980		Census 1990		Census 2000	
Languages	Number	Percent	Number	Percent	Number	Percent
German	1887	74.73%	1995	75.40%	2112	77.73%
Romansh	238	9.43%	136	5.14%	107	3.94%
Italian	230	9.11%	172	6.50%	129	4.75%
Population	2525	100%	2646	100%	2717	100%

== Weather ==
Thusis has an average of 101.6 days of rain per year and on average receives 892 mm (35.1 in) of precipitation. The wettest month is August during which time Thusis receives an average of 112 mm (4.4 in) of precipitation. During this month there is precipitation for an average of 10.7 days. The month with the most days of precipitation is June, with an average of 10.7, but with only 97 mm (3.8 in) of precipitation. The driest month of the year is February with an average of 42 mm (1.7 in) of precipitation over 10.7 days.

== Transportation ==
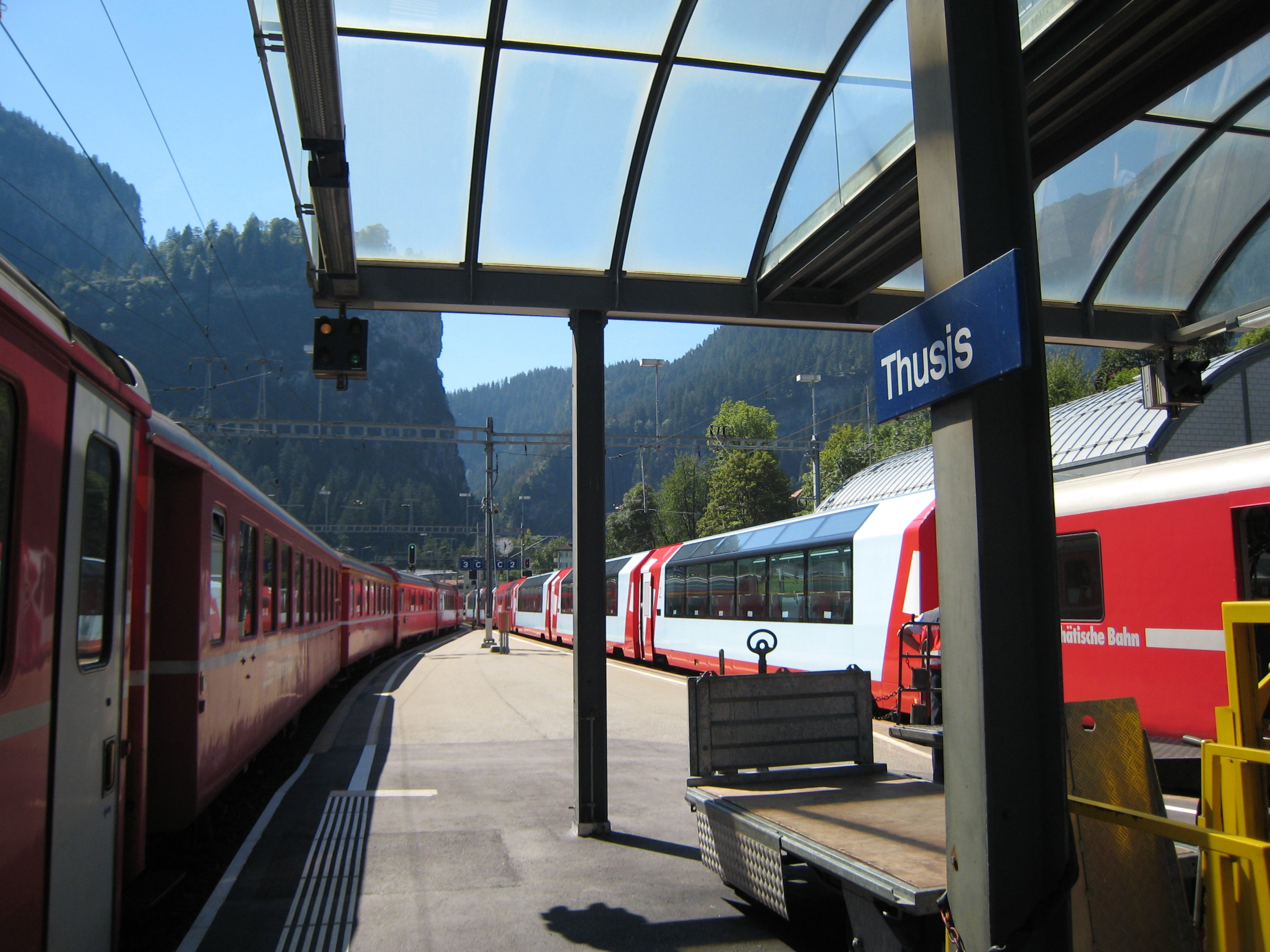
Thusis train station

Located a short distance to the southwest of Chur, Thusis is accessible using the A13 Autobahn (Junctions 20 and 21). The Rhaetian Railway operates services to the Thusis railway station.

== Notable people ==
- Anton Aberle (1876 – 1953 in Thusis) a German–Swiss architect
- Luzius Rüedi (1900 in Thusis – 1993) a Swiss ice hockey player who won a bronze medal in the 1928 Winter Olympics
- Lisa Rüedi (born 2000 in Thusis) a Swiss ice hockey player and two-time Olympian
