= St. Paul's Church, Basel =

Coordinates: 47°33′6″N 7°34′42″E

St. Paul's Church
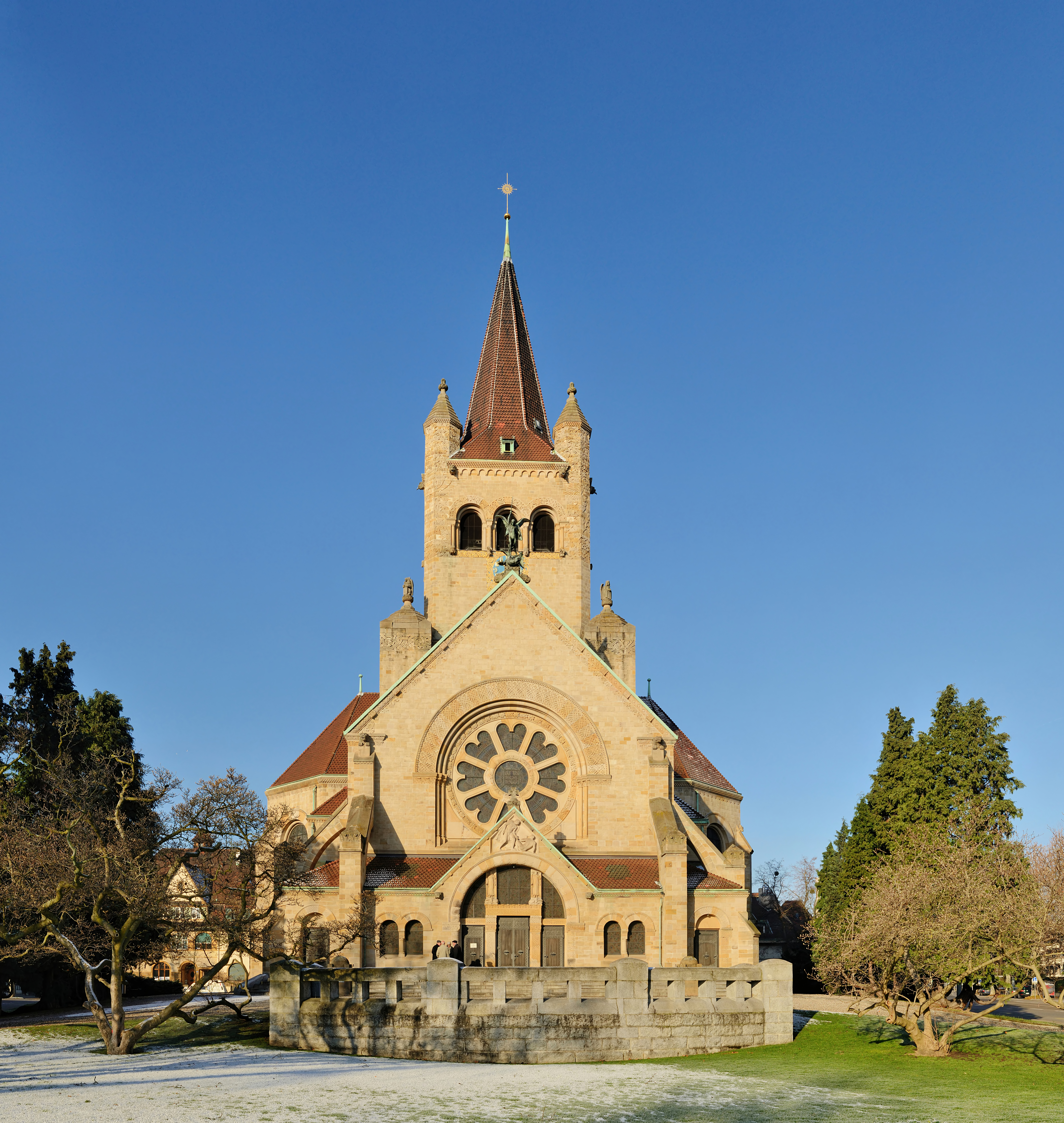
- The front of Pauluskirche, Basel
- St. Paul's Church
- Location: Basel
- Country: Switzerland
- Denomination: Swiss Reformed Church

History
- Dedication: Saint Paul

St. Paul's Church (German: Pauluskirche) is a Reformed Church in Basel, Switzerland, part of the Evangelical-Reformed Church of the Canton Basel-Stadt. The church was constructed between May 1898 and November 1901 by Karl Moser (1860–1936) and Robert Curjel, and features a Neo-Romanesque architectural style. The apse is fitted with a stone pulpit that is raised behind a stone communion table. The apse also features a gallery, with a central arch behind the pulpit, in which the organ and choir are placed. It features artwork in Art Nouveau style including relief work on the church exterior above the main entrance by sculptor Carl Burckhardt (1878–1923), mosaics on the inner front wall by Heinrich Altherr (1878–1947) and stained glass windows by Max Laeuger (1864–1952).

In 2019, the church was secularised and has been converted into a cultural church ("Kulturkirche Paulus"), which started operating in July 2021 as a cultural centre for events, weddings, and choral concerts.
