= Urmein =

- Municipality
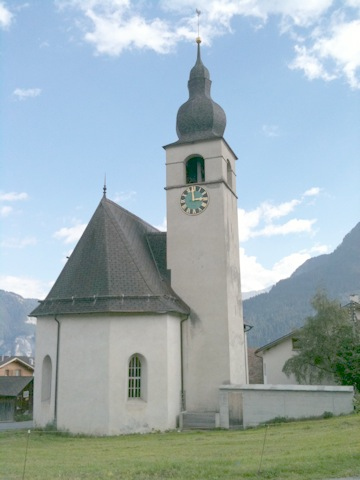

- Flag Coat of arms
- Location of Urmein
- Location within Switzerland Location within Canton of Grisons
- Coordinates: 46°41′N 9°26′E
- Country: Switzerland
- Canton: Grisons
- District: Viamala

Area
  - Total: 4.35 km^{2} (1.68 sq mi)
- Elevation: 1,264 m (4,147 ft)

Population (December 2020)
  - Total: 150
  - Density: 34/km^{2} (89/sq mi)
- Time zone: UTC+01:00 (CET)
  - Summer (DST): UTC+02:00 (CEST)
- Postal code: 7427
- SFOS number: 3670
- ISO 3166 code: CH-GR
- Surrounded by: Flerden, Lohn, Masein, Thusis, Tschappina
- Website: https://www.urmein.ch/ SFSO statistics

Urmein (Romansh: Urmagn) is a municipality in the Viamala Region in the Swiss canton of the Grisons.

== History ==
Urmein is first mentioned in 1156 as Hof de Ormen.

== Geography ==
Urmein has an area, as of 2006, of 4.4 km^{2} (1.7 sq mi). Of this area, 46.9% is used for agricultural purposes, while 39.5% is forested. Of the rest of the land, 5.7% is settled (buildings or roads) and the remainder (7.8%) is non-productive (rivers, glaciers or mountains).

Before 2017, the municipality was located in the Thusis sub-district, of the Hinterrhein district, after 2017 it was part of the Viamala Region. It consists of the haufendorf (an irregular, unplanned and quite closely packed village, built around a central square) village of Urmein in the inner Heinzenberg mountains at an elevation of 1,264 m (4,147 ft).

== Demographics ==
Urmein has a population (as of 31 December 2020) of 150. As of 2008, 3.7% of the population was made up of foreign nationals. Over the last 10 years the population has grown at a rate of 19.8%.

As of 2000, the gender distribution of the population was 45.9% male and 54.1% female. The age distribution, as of 2000, in Urmein is; 1 child or 1.2% of the population is between 0 and 9 years old. 2 children or 2.5% are 10 to 14, and 3 children or 3.7% are 15 to 19. Of the adult population, 14 people or 17.3% of the population are between 20 and 29 years old. 6 people or 7.4% are 30 to 39, 9 people or 11.1% are 40 to 49, and 18 people or 22.2% are 50 to 59. The senior population distribution is 14 people or 17.3% of the population are between 60 and 69 years old, 10 people or 12.3% are 70 to 79, there are 4 people or 4.9% who are 80 to 89.

In the 2007 federal election the most popular party was the SVP which received 66.9% of the vote. The next three most popular parties were the FDP (13.2%), the SPS (12.9%) and the local, small right-wing parties (4.2%).

In Urmein about 72.9% of the population (between age 25-64) have completed either non-mandatory upper secondary education or additional higher education (either university or a Fachhochschule).

Urmein has an unemployment rate of 0%. As of 2005, there were 28 people employed in the primary economic sector and about 11 businesses involved in this sector. No one is employed in the secondary sector. 7 people are employed in the tertiary sector, with 4 businesses in this sector.

The historical population is given in the following table:

year	population
1803	158
1850	133
1900	89
1950	90
2000	81
2019	147

== Languages ==
Most of the population (as of 2000) speaks German (98.8%), with the rest speaking Polish ( 1.2%).

Languages in Urmein
Languages	Census 1980		Census 1990		Census 2000	
Languages	Number	Percent	Number	Percent	Number	Percent
German	73	96.05%	79	97.53%	80	98.77%
Romanish	2	2.63%	2	2.47%	0	0.00%
Population	76	100%	81	100%	81	100%

== See also ==
- Oberurmein
