= Robert Moser (architect) =

Swiss architect (1833–1901)

- Born: 11 September 1833; Baden, Aargau, Switzerland
- Died: 5 December 1901 (aged 68); Zurich, Switzerland
- Education: Technische Hochschule Karlsruhe
- Occupation: Architect
- Spouse: Anna Katharina Juliana Gubler
- Children: Karl Moser
- Buildings: Lenzburg penitentiary; Kursaal, Baden; Cantonal hospital, Aarau

Robert Moser (11 September 1833 – 5 December 1901) was a Swiss architect from Baden. He worked on prison construction and was an early exponent of monument preservation. He built penitentiaries in Basel and Lenzburg, renovated Hallwyl Castle and looked after the monastery buildings of Königsfelden. His other works include the Kursaal in Baden and the cantonal hospital in Aarau.

== Biography ==
Robert Moser was born on 11 September 1833 in Baden, the son of Johann Moser, a master builder (Baumeister), and Anna née Küfer. In 1859 he married Anna Katharina Juliana Gubler. His son Karl Moser also became an architect.

After practical training as an architect, Moser studied at the technical college (Technische Hochschule) in Karlsruhe. While still a student he won the competition for the town school building (Stadtschulhaus) in Baden, which was built to his plans in 1856–1857. A year in French-speaking Switzerland (Welschlandjahr) with Hans Rychner in Neuchâtel was followed by periods of work in Belgium, Paris and Italy.

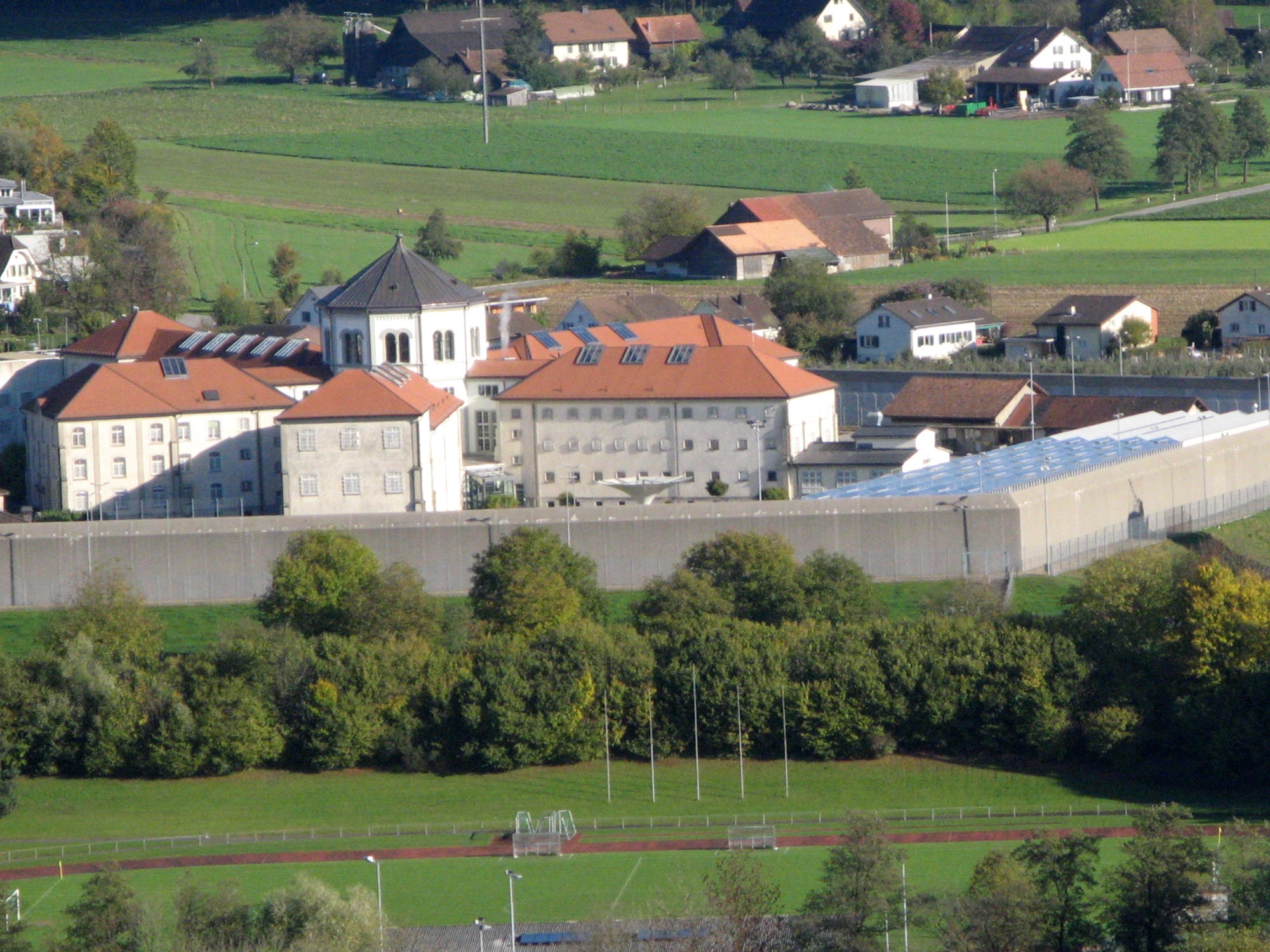
The Lenzburg penitentiary, built by Moser in 1864–1866

Moser worked on prison construction and was an early exponent of monument preservation (Denkmalpflege). With Matthias Oswald he built the Schellenmätteli penitentiary in Basel in 1860–1864, and he built the Lenzburg penitentiary in 1864–1866. In 1871–1874 he renovated Hallwyl Castle together with Eugen Stettler. From 1881 to 1894 he was responsible for the care of the monastery buildings of Königsfelden, from 1891 together with Johann Christoph Kunkler and Rudolf Rahn, and in 1901 he restored the Verena Minster (Verenenmünster) in Zurzach.

Moser was also responsible for building the Catholic churches in Dottikon, Eiken and Wettingen. He built the district office (Bezirksamt) in the old town of Brugg in 1866, the Kursaal in Baden in 1872–1875 and the cantonal hospital (Kantonsspital) in Aarau in 1881–1887. He died in Zurich on 5 December 1901.

== Bibliography ==
- INSA: Inventar der neueren Schweizer Architektur 1850–1920, vol. 1, 1984
- Architektenlexikon der Schweiz 19./20. Jahrhundert, 1998, 387
