= Carl Burckhardt (sculptor) =

Swiss painter and sculptor

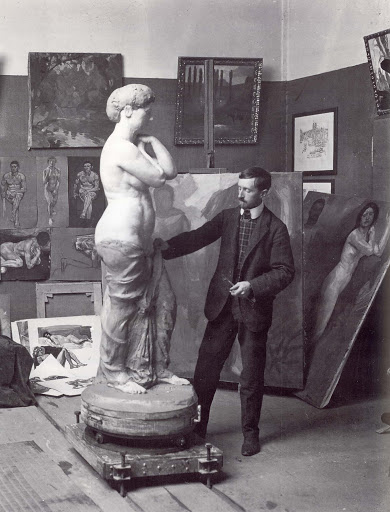
Carl Burckhardt in his studio (date unknown)

Carl Nathanael Burckhardt (13 January 1878, Lindau - 24 December 1923, Ligornetto) was a Swiss painter and sculptor. Although a modernist, his choice of subject matter was Neoclassically inspired.

== Life and work ==
After his father's early death, his family moved to Basel. He began his studies in 1896, as a student of the painter, Fritz Schider, then attended a private school operated by Heinrich Knirr in Munich. In 1899, he took a trip to Rome with his friend, Heinrich Altherr, which drew his interests toward sculpting. In 1901, he started work on his first sculpture, featuring Zeus and Eros. He then came under the influence of Max Klinger and created a statue of Venus in 1904. Five years later, he won a competition for the design of niche figures and façade reliefs at the Kunsthaus Zürich. The reliefs featured Amazon figures that were cut by his assistant, Louis Léon Weber in 1912.

From 1913 until his death, he was an active member of the Basler Kunstverein. One of his best known works is an Amazon leading a horse, on the Mittlere Brücke. It is also his last work. The casting was done after his death. Other public works in Basel include the portal relief at the Pauluskirche and a bronze statue of St. George slaying the dragon; which was awarded first prize in a competition held by the Kunstkredit Basel-Stadt, to design a figure for a stairway in the Kohlenberg District.

He was married to the painter, Sophie Hipp, younger sister of the painter Johanna Hipp. Their son was the religious scholar, Titus Burckhardt. He died after a brief illness at his home in Ticino.

In 1954, a commemorative exhibition at the Kunsthalle Basel featured works by Burckhardt and Numa Donzé. A major retrospective was held in 2018 at the Museo Vincenzo Vela in Ligornetto.

== Selected works ==
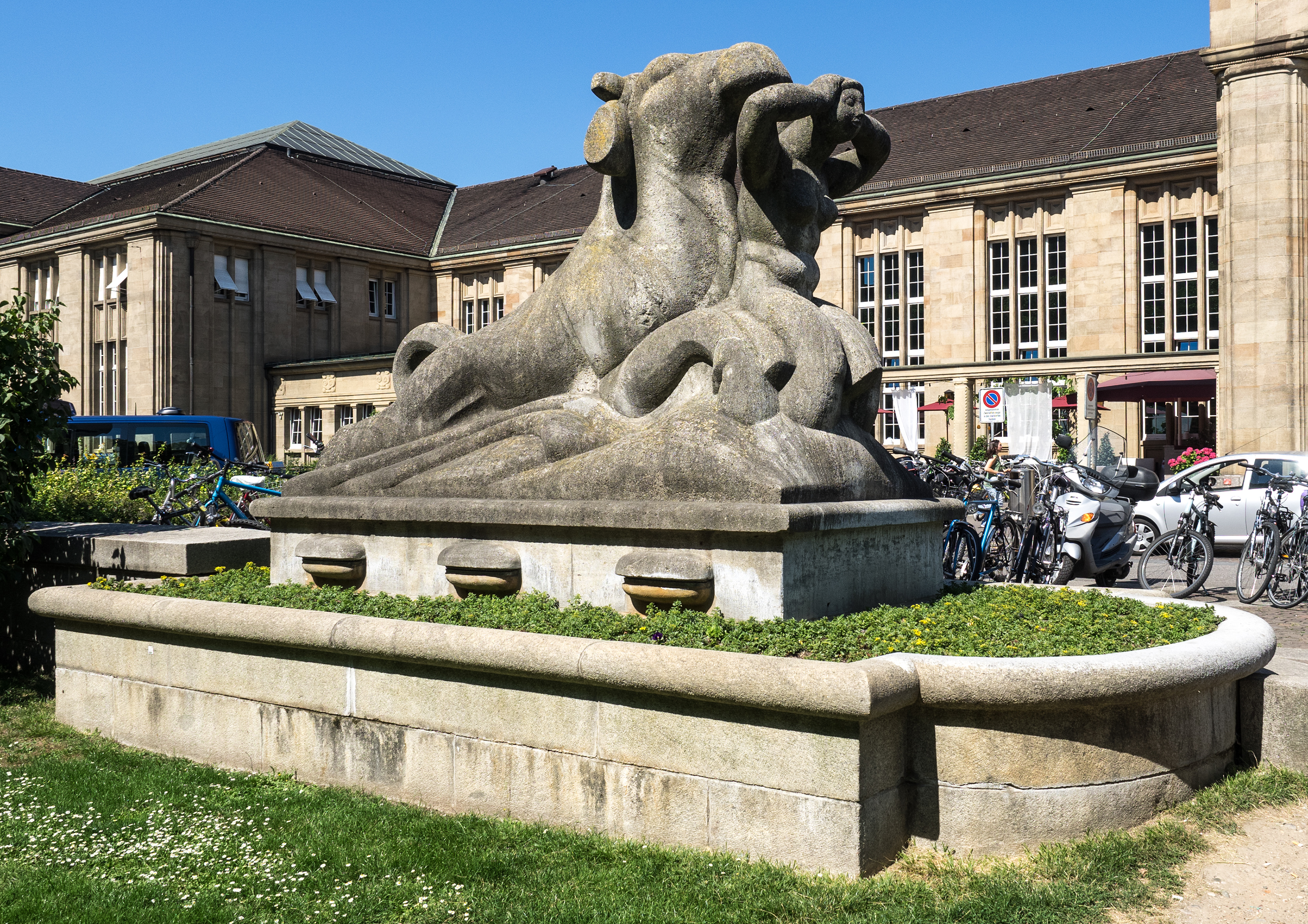
Northern fountain at the Basel Badischer Bahnhof

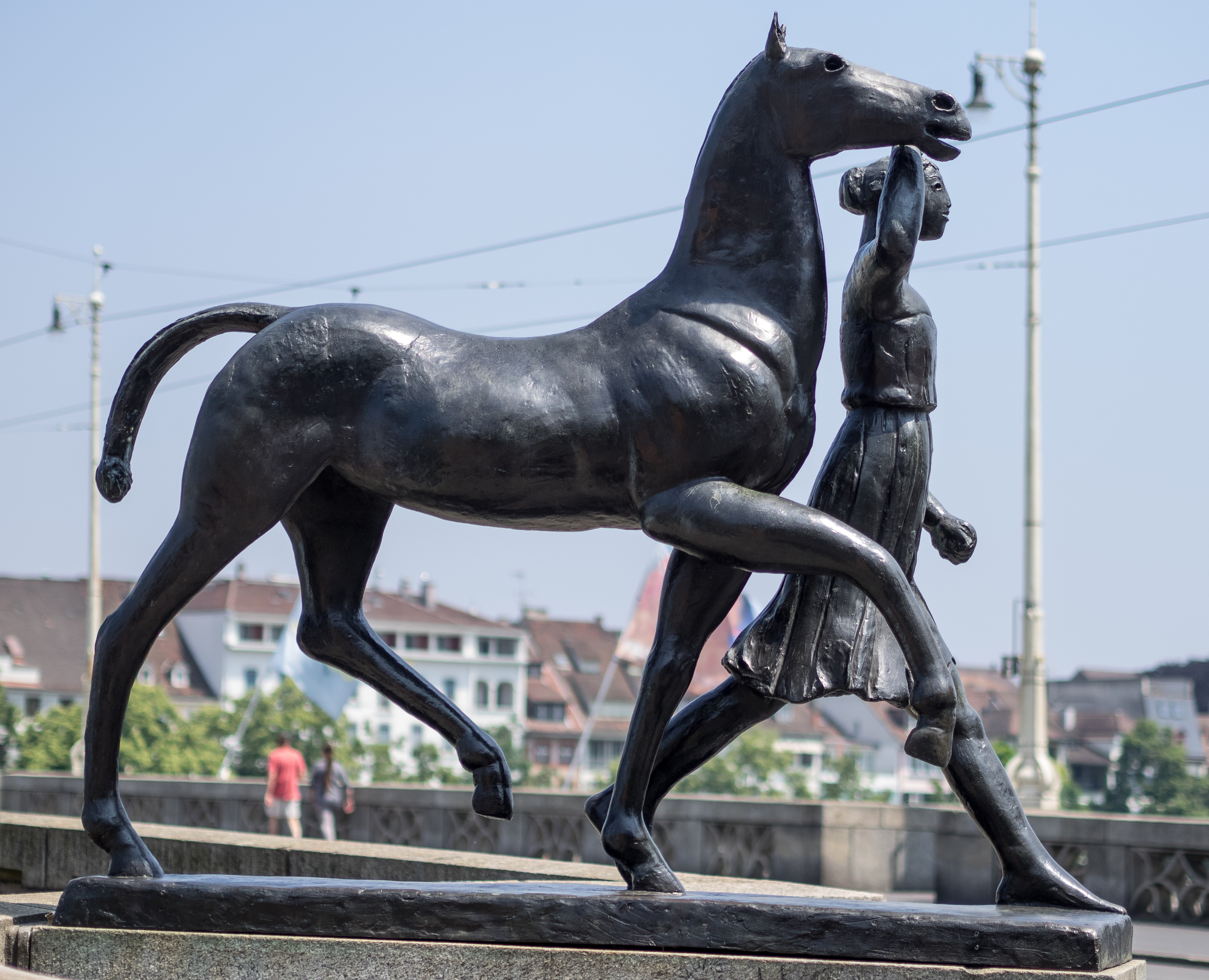
Amazon Leading a Horse, at the Mittlere Brücke

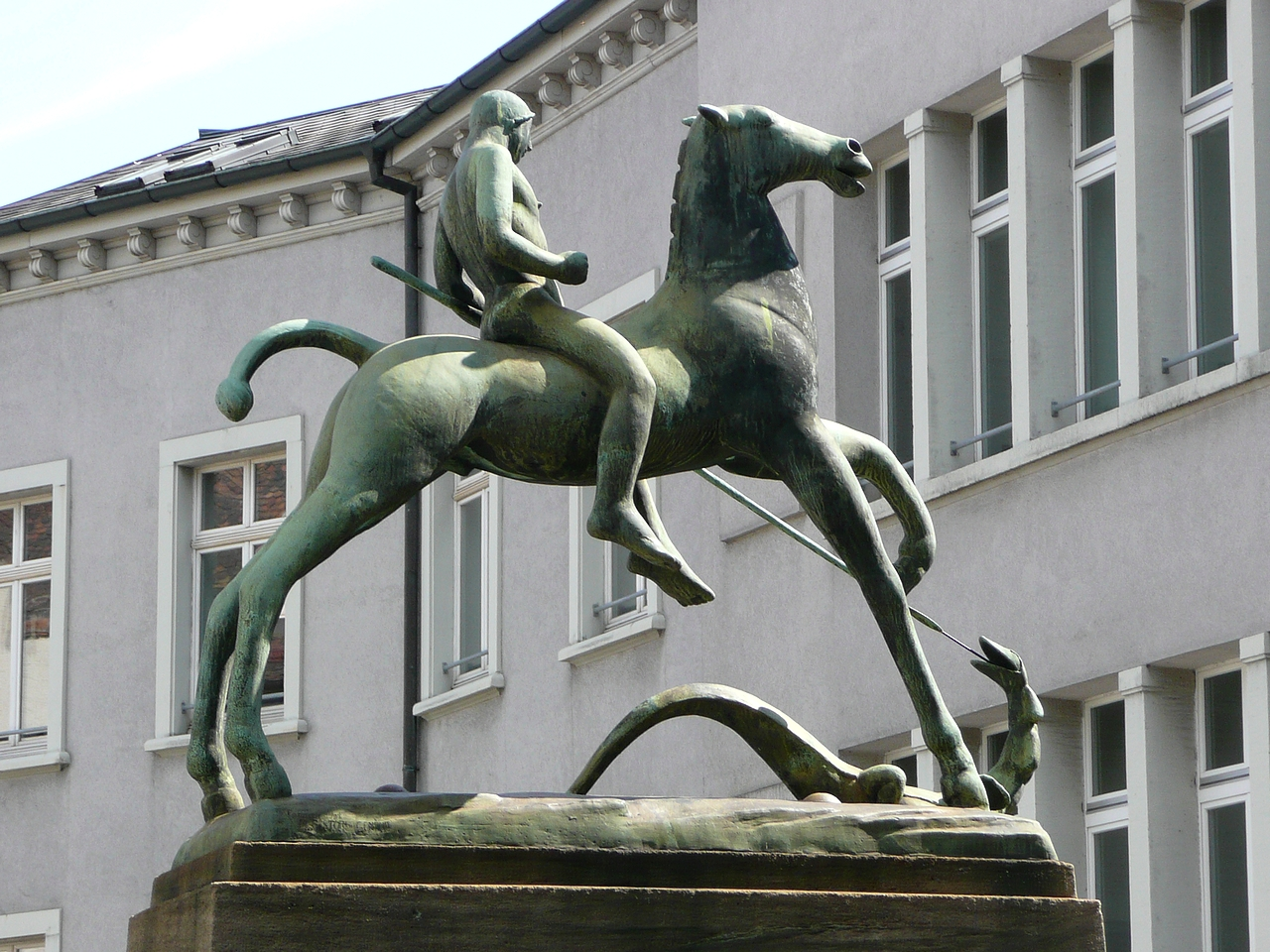
St. George and the Dragon

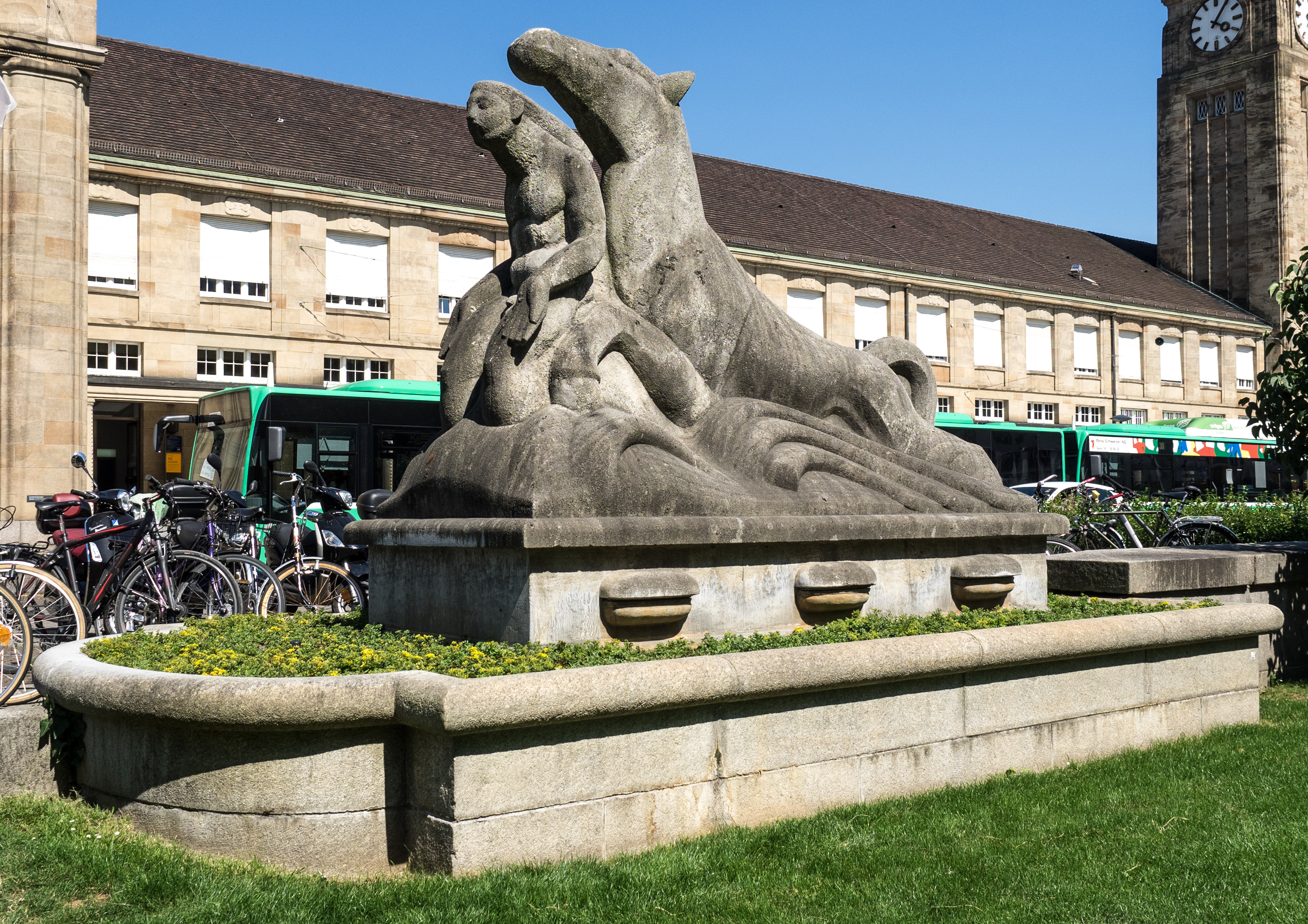
Southern fountain, at the Bahnhof
