= Robert Curjel =

German-Swiss architect

- Born: 17 December 1859; St Gallen, Switzerland
- Died: 18 August 1925 (aged 65); Emmetten, Switzerland
- Education: Karlsruhe Institute of Technology and Technical University of Munich
- Children: Hans Curjel

Robert Curjel (born 17 December 1859 in St. Gallen, Switzerland; died 18 August 1925 in Emmett, Switzerland) was a German-Swiss architect.

== Early life and education ==
Curjel attended the Technical University of Karlsruhe and the Technical University of Munich. In 1888, he founded the architectural firm Curjel and Moser with Karl Moser. From 1916, Curiel worked for the Badischer Baubund.

== Buildings ==
- Johanneskirche in Bern (1893)
- Christ Church in Karlsruhe (1900)
- Südwestdeutsche Landesbank in Karlsruhe (1901)
- St Paul's Church in Basel (1901)
- Langmatt Museum in Baden (1902)
- St John's Church in Mannheim (1904)
- St Paul's Church, Bern (1905)
- Kunsthaus Zürich (1910)
- Basel Badischer, Basel (1913)
- Main building of the University of Zürich (1913)

== Family ==
Curjel and his wife Marie Curjel (née Hermann) were both Jewish. Marie committed suicide on 27 April 1940 because of the threat of deportation to a concentration camp.

His daughter Gertrud (b. 5 March 1893) was murdered in Auschwitz concentration camp in February 1943. His son Hans Curjel (b. 1 May 1896; d. 3 January 1974) was an art historian, conductor, and theatre director, who successfully emigrated to Switzerland in 1933.
