= Hans Curjel =

Swiss art historian, conductor and theatre director

- Born: 1 May 1896; Karlsruhe, Germany
- Died: 3 January 1974 (aged 77); Zürich, Switzerland
- Education: University of Freiburg; University of Vienna; Humboldt University of Berlin
- Occupations: Art historian, theatre director
- Father: Robert Curjel

Hans Richard Curjel (1 May 1896 – 3 January 1974) was a Swiss art historian, conductor and theatre director.

== Education ==
Curjel attended Humboldt School in Berlin and studied music before changing to art history at the University of Freiburg, the University of Vienna, and the Humboldt University of Berlin.

== Art and theatre ==
From 1925, he held the position as director of the Staatliche Kunsthalle Karlsruhe. In 1927, he took over from Otto Klemperer as conductor and director at the Kroll Opera House until it closed in 1931. He was a close friend of artist Arnold Bode. Until 1933, Curjel acted as the guest director of the Deutsche Oper Berlin.

== Emigration to Switzerland ==
In 1933, Curjel emigrated to Switzerland to avoid persecution by the Nazis because of his Jewish faith. From 1942 to 1949 he was director of the Zurich Theatre and Touring Cooperative.

== Later career ==
From 1948, Curjel worked as a freelance director in Berlin, Paris, Rome and Zurich. At the 1949 Salzburg Festival, he directed Mozart's La clemenza di Tito. In the Federal Republic of Germany, he produced several radio programmes on new music, most often for West German Radio.

== Family ==
Curjel was born to upper middle class Jewish parents, Robert Curjel and Marie Curjel (née Hermann). His sister Gertrud was murdered in the Auschwitz concentration camp in February 1943.
