= St. Paul's Church, Bern =

Coordinates: 46°57′10.6″N 7°25′49.0″E

St. Paul's Church
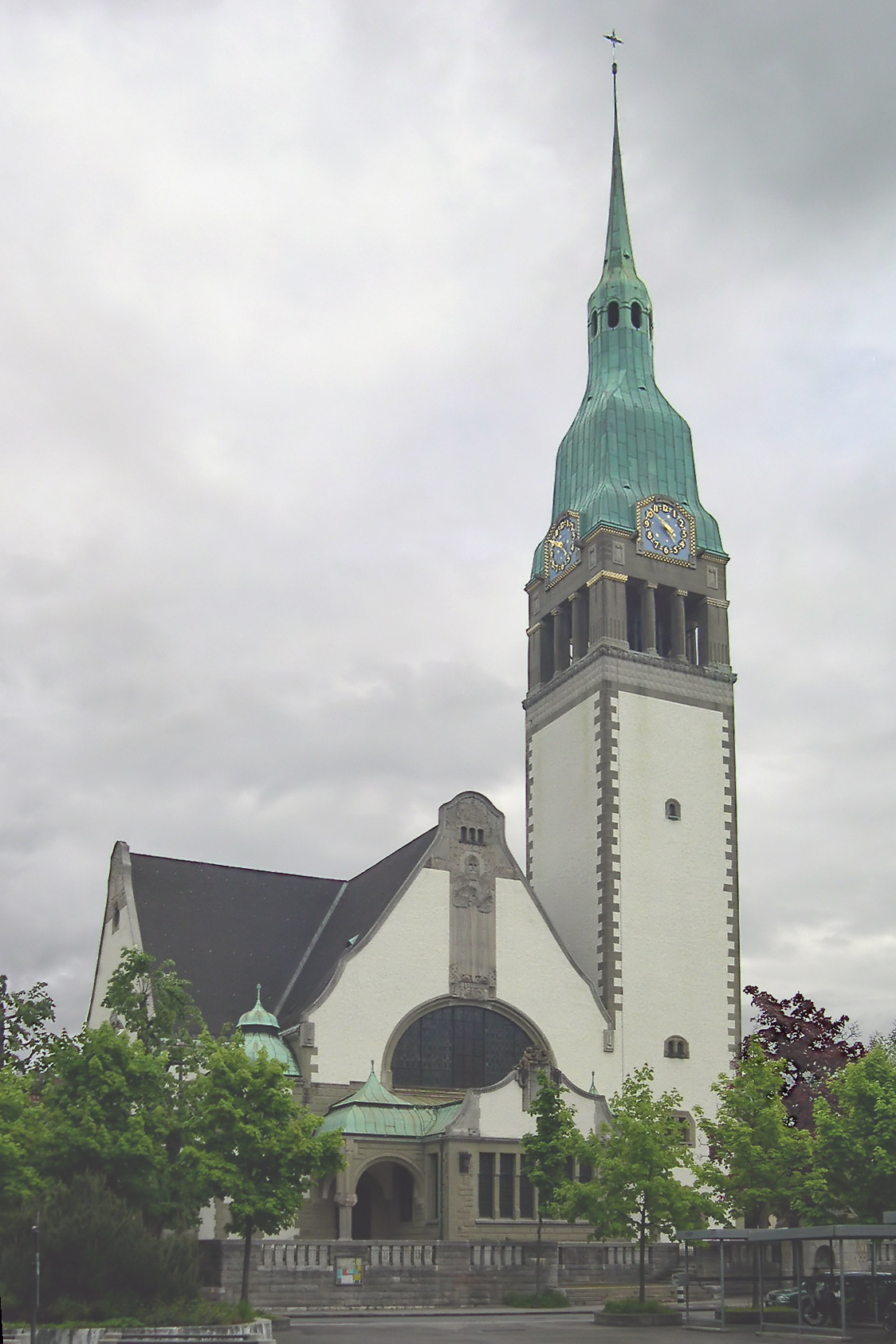
- The front of St. Paul's, Bern
- St. Paul's Church
- Location: Bern
- Country: Switzerland
- Denomination: Swiss Reformed Church
- Website: http://www.pauluskirche.ch/

History
- Dedication: Saint Paul

St. Paul's Church (German: Pauluskirche) is a Reformed Church in Bern, Switzerland built by Swiss architect Karl Moser from 1902 to 1905 in an Art Nouveau style. It a cultural property of national significance in Switzerland and one of the best examples of Art Nouveau in the country. The bell tower is 36 m high and contains 5 bells. The facade of the church features a relief sculpture with a representation of the Apostle Paul with a sword. The stained glass windows are by the artist Max Laeuger from Lörrach. The interior features blue and green hues, with rich gold decoration painting.

Restorations on the church were carried out in 2009, which included the replacement of the organ. The contract for the construction of the new organ was given to Metzler in Dietikon. The new organ, which features 37 stops and 2294 pipes, was returned to its original 1905 location at the front of the church, having previously been moved during renovation carried out during 1969–70. Restoration was also carried out on the "Angel Window", which was to be returned to the North gallery, as well as the painting of the vault.
