= Karl Moser =

Swiss architect (1860–1936)

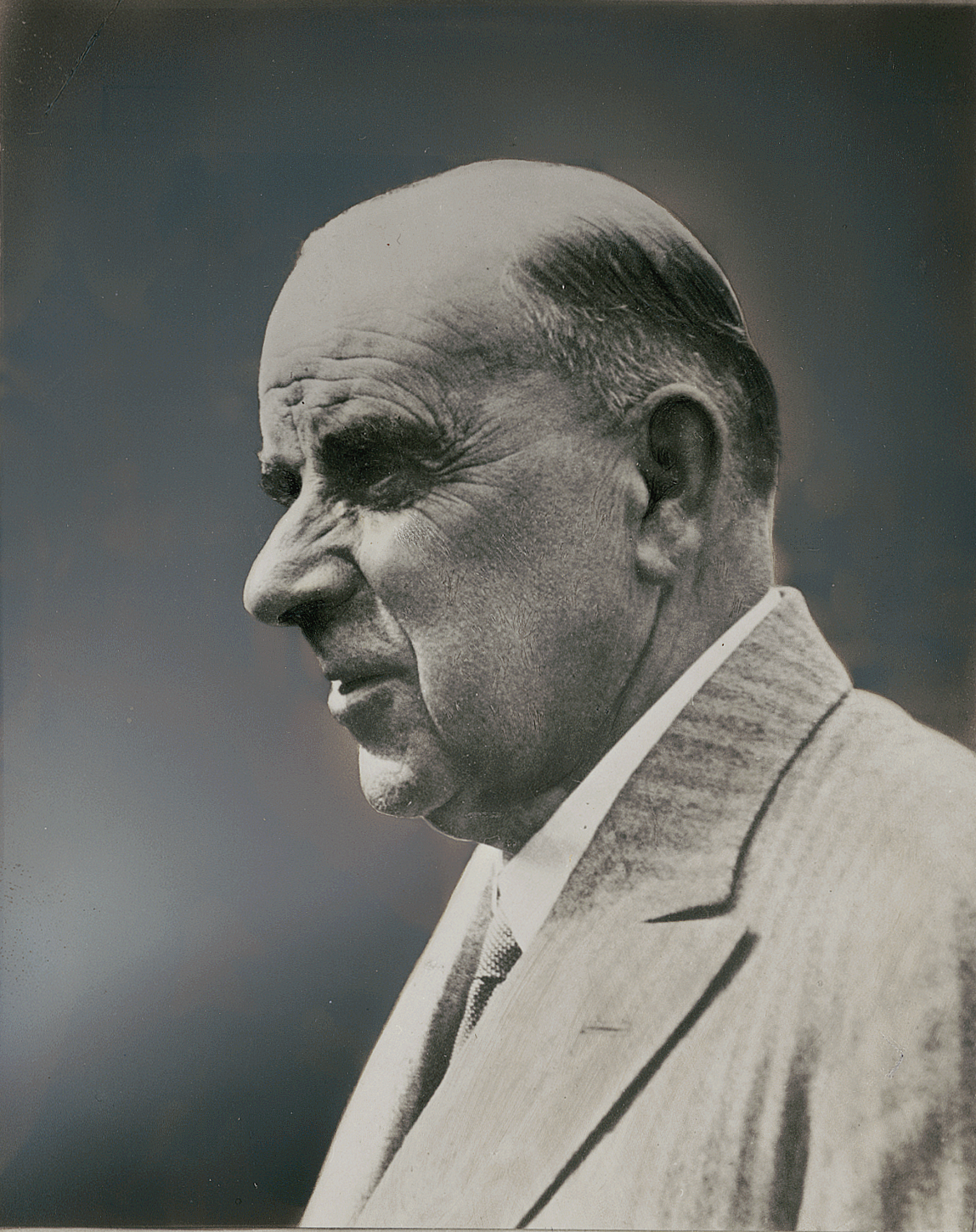
- Moser, c. 1915
- Born: Karl Coelestin Moser; 10 August 1860; Baden, Switzerland
- Died: 28 February 1936 (aged 75); Zurich, Switzerland
- Education: Zurich Polytechnic, École des Beaux-Arts
- Occupations: Architect, university professor
- Spouse: Euphemie Lorenz
- Children: 5, including Werner M. Moser

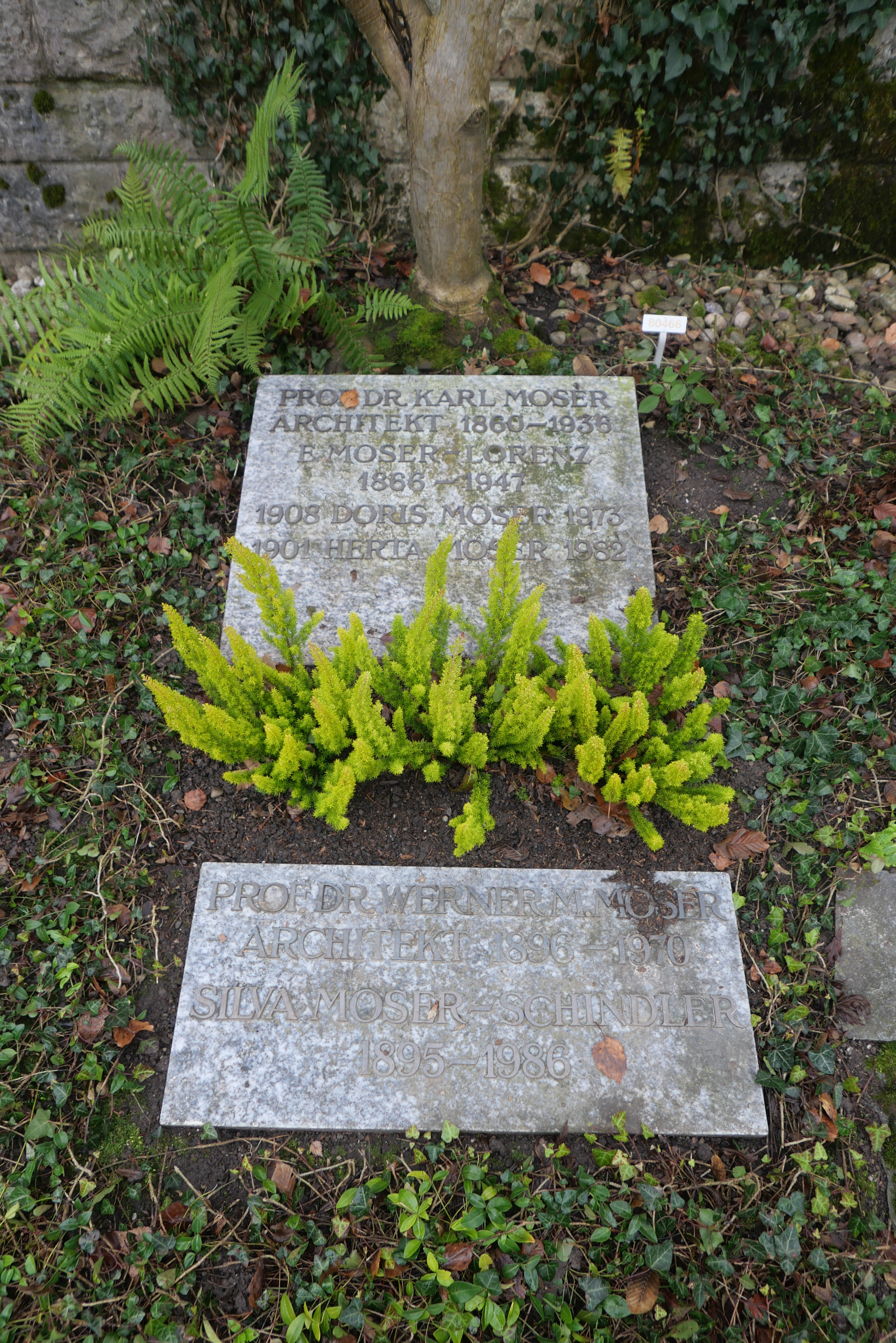
The Moser family grave at Fluntern Cemetery in Zurich

Karl Coelestin Moser (10 August 1860 – 28 February 1936) was a Swiss architect and professor who became known in Switzerland as the "father of modern architecture". As co-founder of Curjel & Moser, he designed major public buildings including the Kunsthaus Zürich, the main building of the University of Zurich and Basel Badischer Bahnhof. Over the course of his career, his work shifted from historically influenced architecture towards modern design, exemplified by St. Anton Church in Basel. Moser later taught at ETH Zurich and served as the inaugural president of the Congrès Internationaux d’Architecture Moderne from 1928 to 1930.

== Biography ==
Karl Coelestin Moser was born in Baden, Switzerland, on 10 August 1860. His father, Robert Moser, was an architect. He studied architecture at the Zurich Polytechnic from 1878 to 1882 under Alfred Friedrich Bluntschli. After graduating, he briefly worked in Bluntschli’s architectural practice. He continued his studies at the École des Beaux-Arts in Paris with Jean-Louis Pascal and also worked in the office of Jules-Aubert-Clément Reboul.

While working in Wiesbaden, Moser met Robert Curjel. He travelled to Italy in 1887. During his travels, Moser also made architectural sketches, including numerous drawings from his journeys in Italy. In 1887, he married Euphemie Lorenz. They had five children, including the architect Werner M. Moser. Moser and Curjel founded Curjel & Moser in Karlsruhe in 1888.

Moser declined an appointment at ETH Zurich in 1899. From 1907 to 1912, he worked for the Baden state railways as an architectural adviser. The University of Zurich awarded Moser an honorary doctorate in 1914. In 1915, he left the partnership and became a professor of architecture at ETH Zurich, where he taught until 1928. He also established an architectural practice in Zurich, which he maintained until 1936.

Moser served as the first president of the Congrès Internationaux d’Architecture Moderne from 1928 to 1930. He died in Zurich on 28 February 1936.

== Architecture ==
Moser's architectural work included nearly 600 buildings and projects across a wide range of building types, including housing and urban planning.

=== Curjel & Moser ===
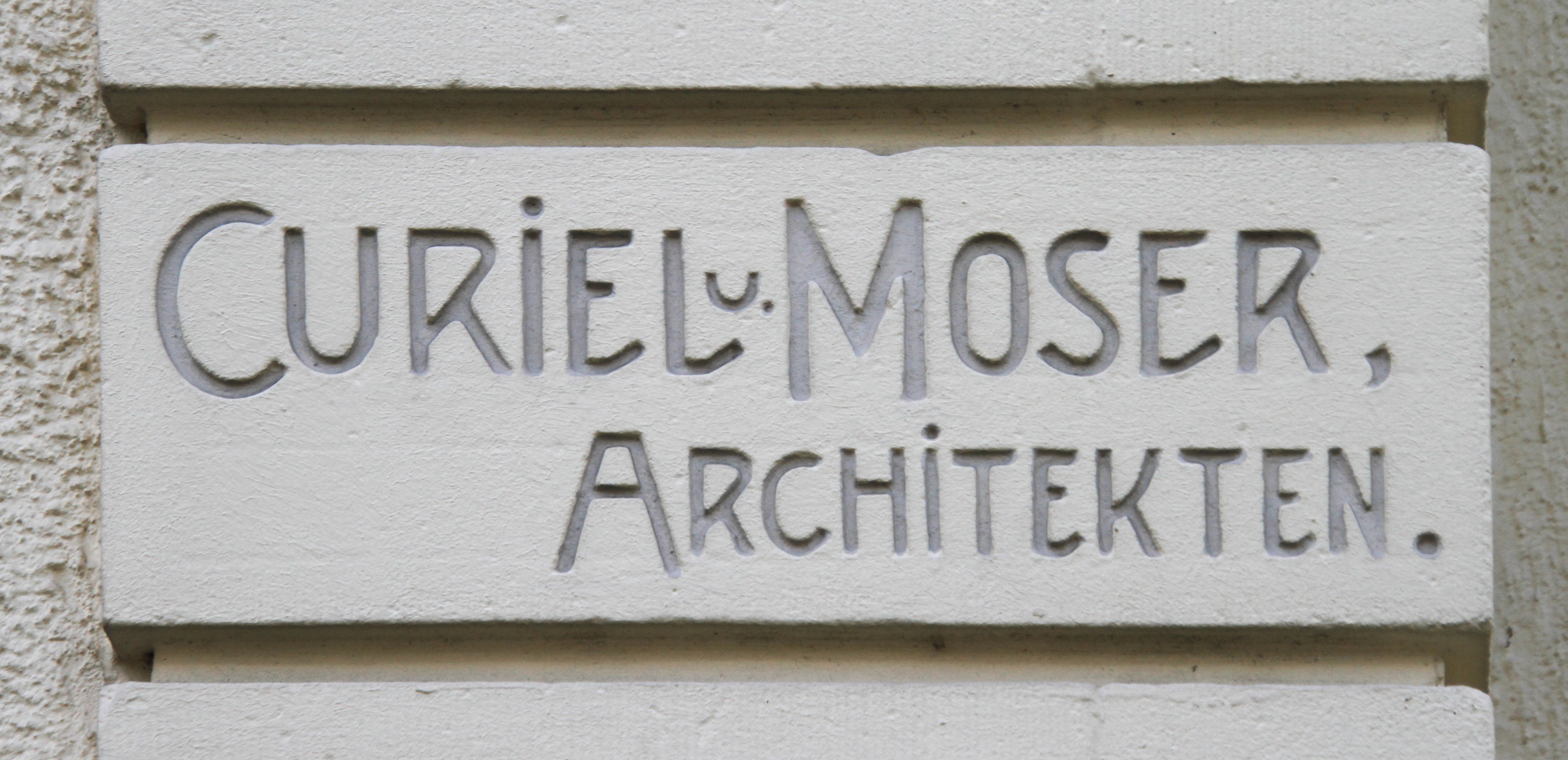
Cultural heritage monument in Lichtental, Baden-Baden

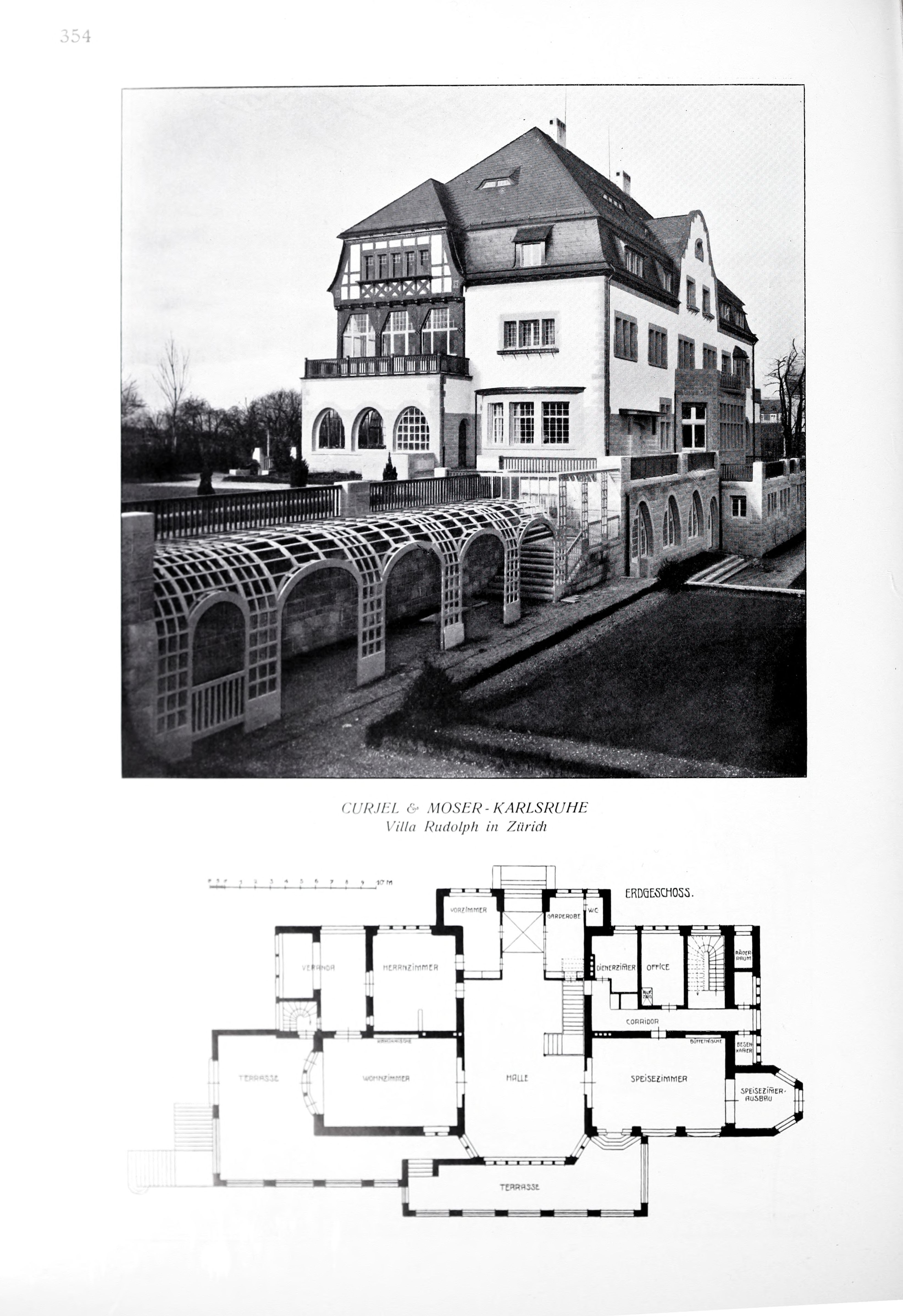
Illustration of work by Curjel & Moser in Moderne Bauformen (1906)

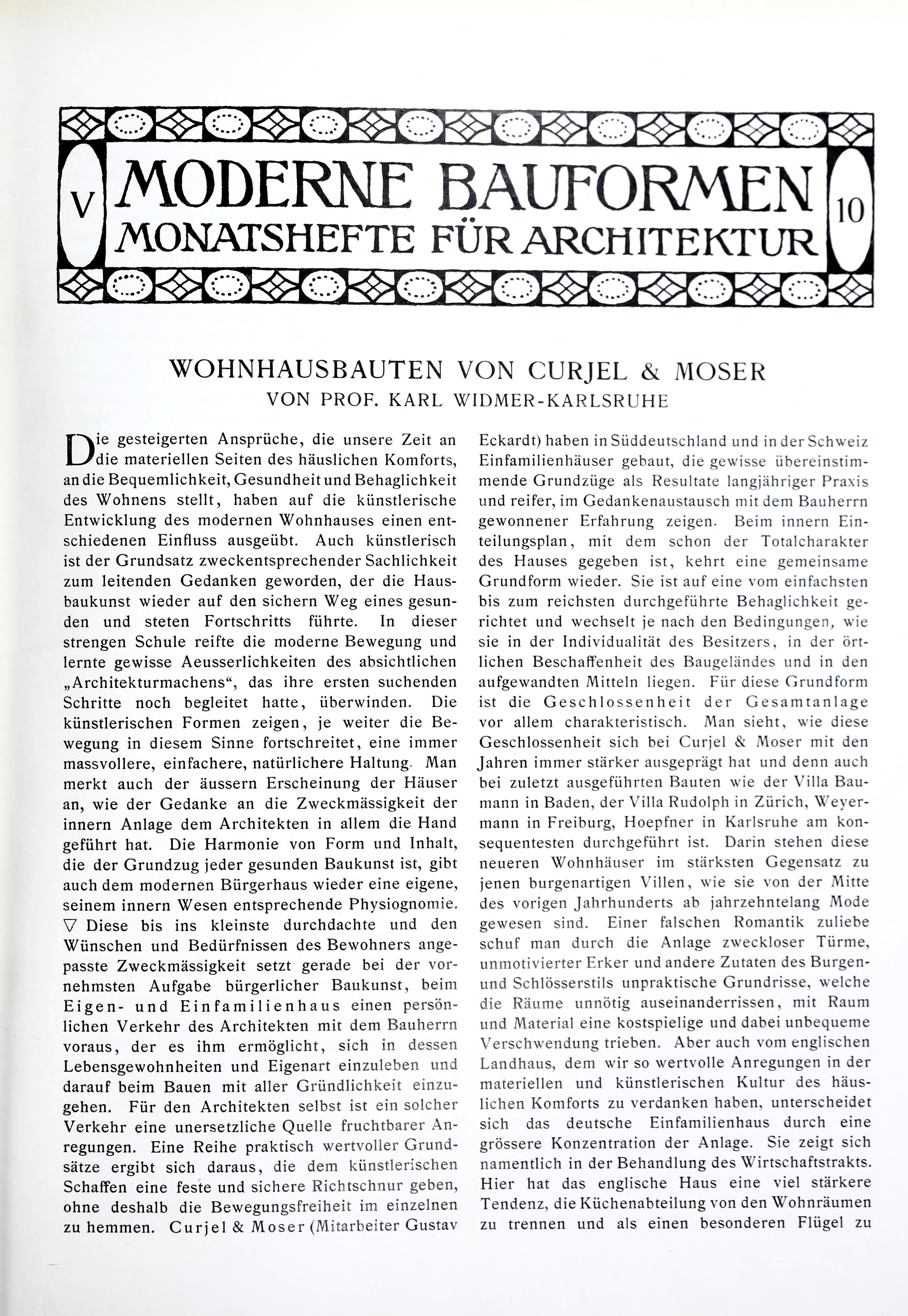
Page from Moderne Bauformen (1906)

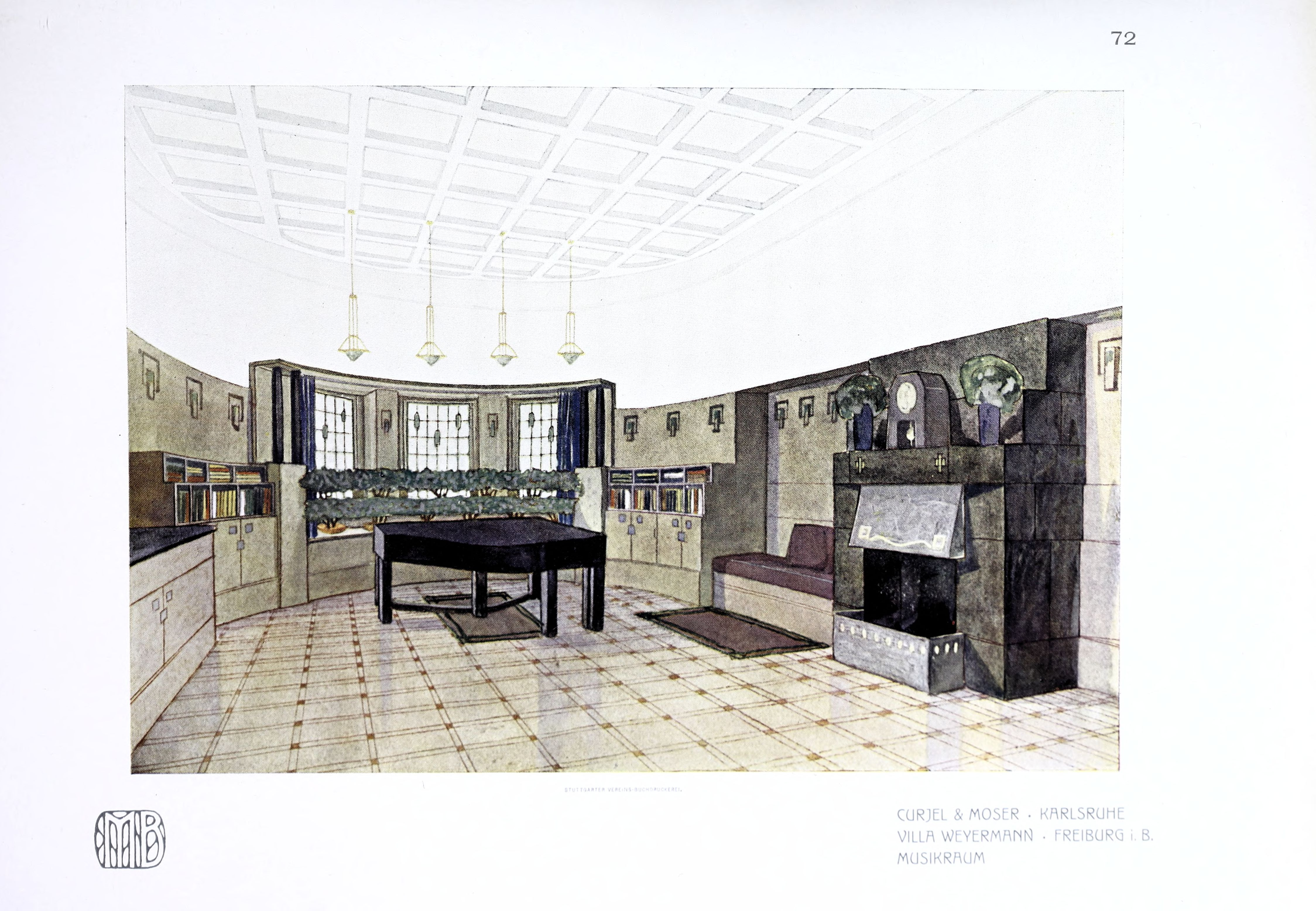
Page from Moderne Bauformen (1906)

Within Curjel & Moser, Karl Moser generally directed the firm’s Swiss projects. Robert Curjel focused mainly on residential and commercial work in Karlsruhe. Moser was also responsible for much of the firm’s architectural design. The practice completed public and private commissions in Baden. Around 1900, Curjel & Moser and Hermann Billing were associated with the Jung-Karlsruher Schule. Their projects included churches, schools, houses, commercial buildings and industrial projects.

Curjel & Moser won the competition for Basel's Pauluskirche from a field of 56 entries. The church combined a Romanesque-influenced central plan with extensive figurative sculpture and contemporary Jugendstil elements. Max Laeuger designed its stained-glass windows. This kind of collaboration with other artists was a recurring feature of Moser's architectural practice, with painters, sculptors and decorative artists often involved in his projects from an early stage. During a journey to England with Laeuger in 1896, he encountered the Arts and Crafts movement and the work of the American architect Henry Hobson Richardson. Richardson's influence can be seen in the round-arched forms of some of Moser's early work with Curjel, including the Pauluskirche in Basel. International exchange remained important throughout Moser's career, and he drew on contemporary developments in architecture in shaping his own work. From around 1900, Moser often contrasted compact exteriors with more expansive interiors featuring curved staircases and large halls. Between 1899 to 1901, he designed Villa Langmatt in Baden. The villa combined elements of the English country-house tradition and German Jugendstil with a modern internal layout. Its original interiors were designed by Moser together with Max Laeuger.

Among the firm's principal works were the Kunsthaus Zürich, the University of Zurich’s main building and Basel Badischer Bahnhof. At Basel Badischer Bahnhof, the reception hall was a tall, semi-circular vaulted space within the station's elongated plan. For the Kunsthaus façade, Moser worked with the sculptor Carl Burckhardt, whose reliefs were incorporated into the building. The Kunsthaus had a relatively austere exterior, while its interior used more ornament and elements associated with the Secession style. The interior also included work by Ferdinand Hodler, whose monumental mural was intended for the main staircase.

In 1908, Moser and Robert Curjel won the competition to design the new University of Zurich building. He adapted the university complex to its sloping site, placing the main building further back towards the Zürichberg and the biology building closer to the city. The canton sought a monumental building, but Moser adapted the design to the site. The University of Zurich building combined round-arched forms with references to Greek Doric architecture. Its central courtyard incorporated references to different historical periods. He also commissioned several contemporary artists for the building's decoration, including the young painter Paul Bodmer. The tower was not a dominant feature of the original competition design but was enlarged during later revisions. The completed ten-storey, 65-metre tower was Zurich's first high-rise building.

=== Independent work and modernism ===
Moser initially worked with historical styles. Around 1910, he began using more restrained and classical forms. His Fluntern Church, completed in 1920, was designed in a Neoclassical style. In the early 1920s, Moser and the architect Paul Ulrich developed a small group of houses on Rainstrasse in Wollishofen. The houses had simpler, more uniform forms than the earlier Jugendstil villas. Moser was also interested in contemporary Dutch architecture and exchanged ideas with younger architects at ETH Zurich.

St. Anton Church in Basel was among the principal works of Moser's independent career. It represented the culmination of his church architecture. Switzerland’s first church built with exposed concrete, the building left its concrete exposed on both the interior and exterior. The interior is a high three-aisled hall, with the central nave supported by slender concrete piers. The stained-glass windows were designed by Hans Stocker and Otto Staiger. Completed in 1927, it became an internationally recognised early landmark of modern concrete architecture. Its exposed concrete attracted both admiration and criticism when the church opened. The church was placed under monument protection in 1987.

Moser continued to develop the Kunsthaus after the end of the Curjel & Moser partnership. A rear addition incorporating a reading room was completed, while later expansion proposals remained unrealised. During the 1930s, Moser increasingly aligned his work with the New Building movement, and his later Kunsthaus proposals incorporated ideas associated with contemporary modernist architecture.

Beyond St. Anton Church, his Zurich practice designed housing estates with social facilities for Swiss industrial companies, as well as commercial buildings in Baden and Schaffhausen. His post office in Baden, opened in 1931, was later altered and expanded several times by Haefeli Moser Steiger, whose members included his son Werner M. Moser.

In a 1933 redevelopment plan for Zurich’s Niederdorf, Moser proposed replacing most of the historic buildings with simple cubic structures. Only a small number of monuments were to be retained. The wider plan included roughly 30 high-rise buildings. The Grossmünster, Rathaus and Kunsthaus were among the existing buildings that would have remained. Moser's proposal was influenced by Le Corbusier’s Plan Voisin.

== Teaching and academic career ==
Moser's candidacy for the ETH professorship drew objections over his age, architectural outlook and continuing private practice. He was nevertheless appointed after his professional experience and body of work were judged favourably. At ETH Zurich, he reorganised the architectural curriculum, giving construction a more prominent place alongside the teaching of architectural history and design.

Moser gradually adopted a more interactive approach to teaching. In later years, some of his seminars centred on the joint discussion of architectural problems rather than formal lectures. He also supported younger architects working in modern architecture. As a competition juror, he also supported modern architecture, notably in the 1927 competition for the League of Nations headquarters in Geneva, where he supported a first prize for Le Corbusier.

By the 1920s, he was mentoring architects associated with the architectural avant-garde. His students included architects who later became prominent representatives of the New Building movement. Among them were Werner Moser, Max Ernst Haefeli and Rudolf Steiger, who later formed the architectural partnership Haefeli Moser Steiger.

== Selected works ==
A selection of Moser's architectural works includes:

- Villa Boveri, Baden (1896–1897)
- Pauluskirche, Basel (1897–1901)
- Bankhaus Veit L. Homburger, Karlsruhe (1898–1901)
- Villa Langmatt, Baden (1899–1901)
- Kunsthaus Zürich (1904–1910)
- Lutherkirche, Karlsruhe (1905–1907)
- Main building of the University of Zurich (1908–1914)
- Basel Badischer Bahnhof (1908–1913)
- Fluntern Church, Zurich (1914–1920)
- Kosthaus Bally, Schönenwerd (1917–1920)
- St. Anton Church, Basel (1923–1927)
- Post office, Baden (1926–1931)
- Georg Fischer AG extension, Schaffhausen (1929–1932)

== Legacy ==
Moser was a leading Swiss architect around the turn of the twentieth century and played an important role in the development of modern architecture in Switzerland. During his lifetime, Le Corbusier reportedly called him the "father of modernism". By the 1920s, he was also widely known in Switzerland as the "father of modern architecture". His reforms to architectural education and sustained support for younger designers contributed to the international recognition of modern Swiss architecture.

== Gallery ==
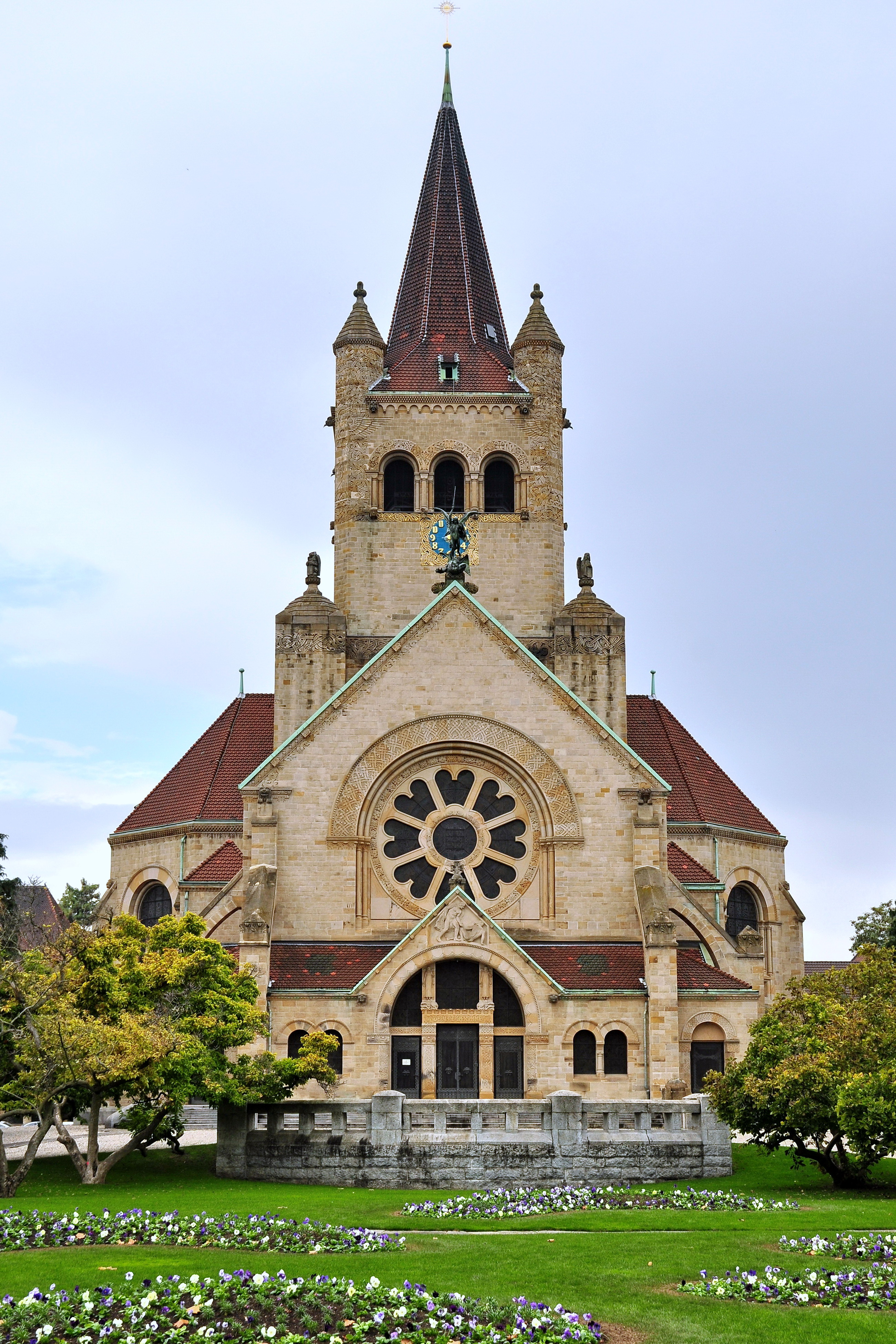
Pauluskirche in Basel (1897–1901), designed by Curjel & Moser

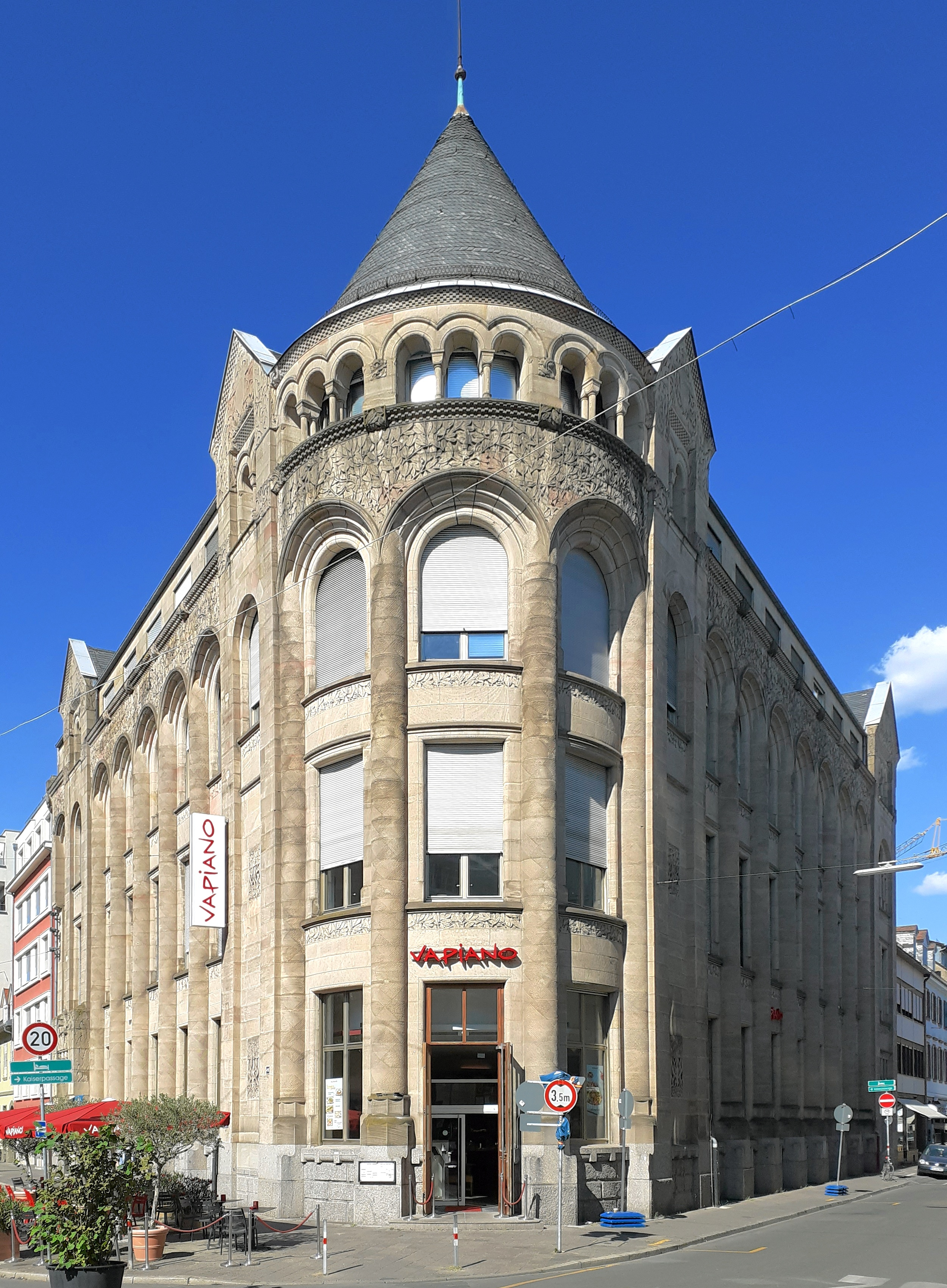
Bankhaus Veit L. Homburger in Karlsruhe (1898–1901), designed by Curjel & Moser

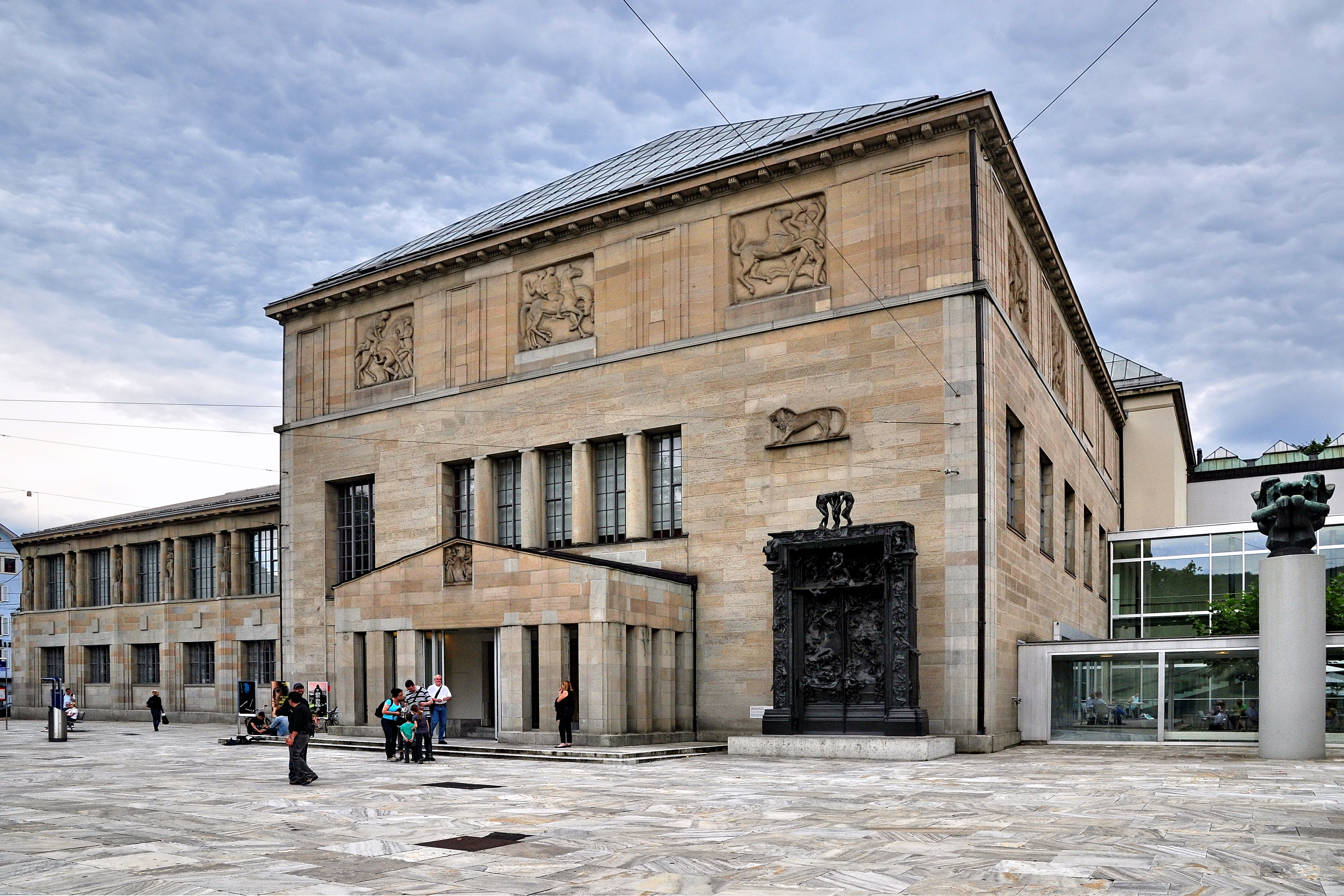
Kunsthaus Zürich (1904–1910), designed by Curjel & Moser

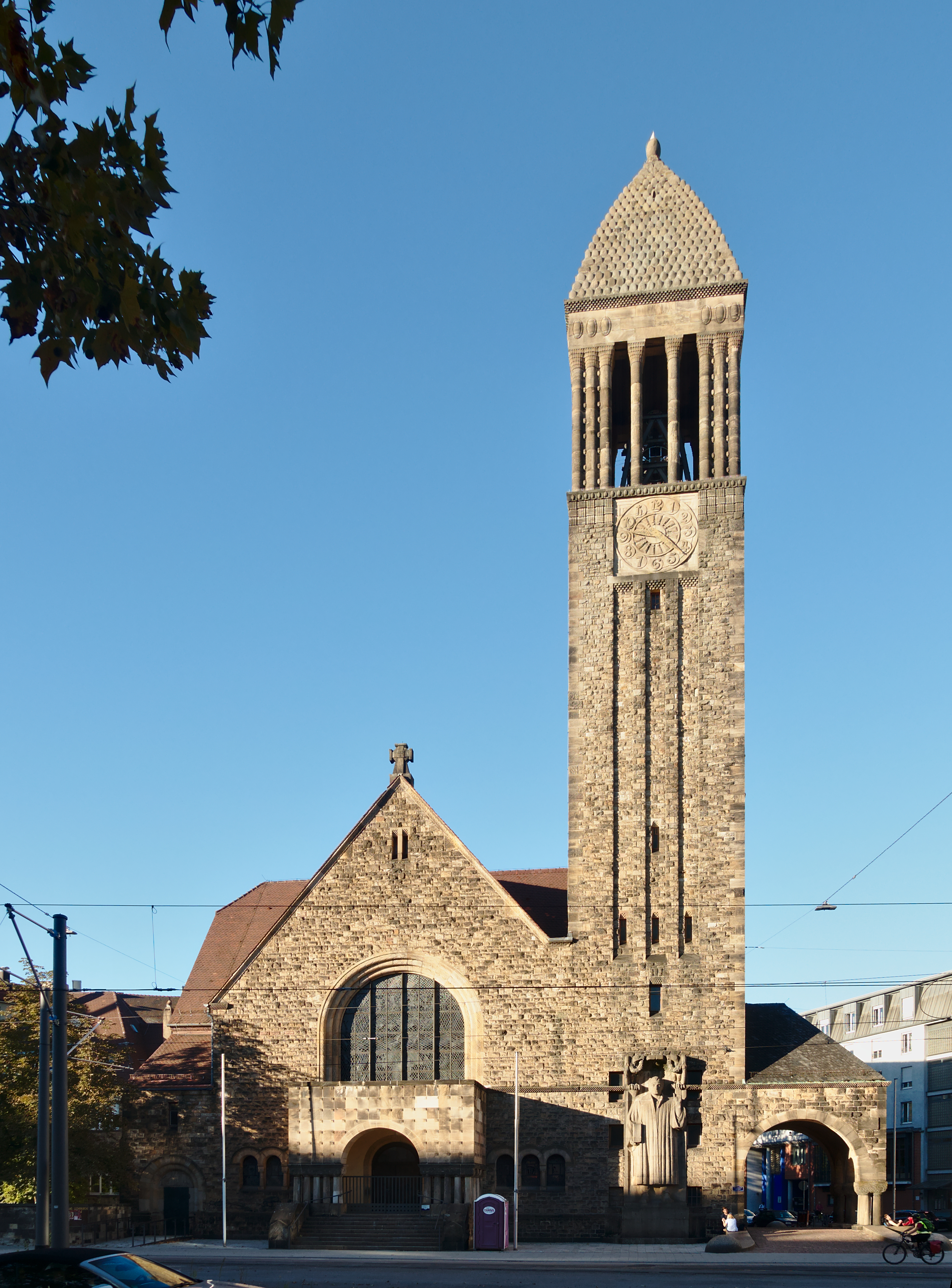
Lutherkirche in Karlsruhe (1905–1907), designed by Curjel & Moser

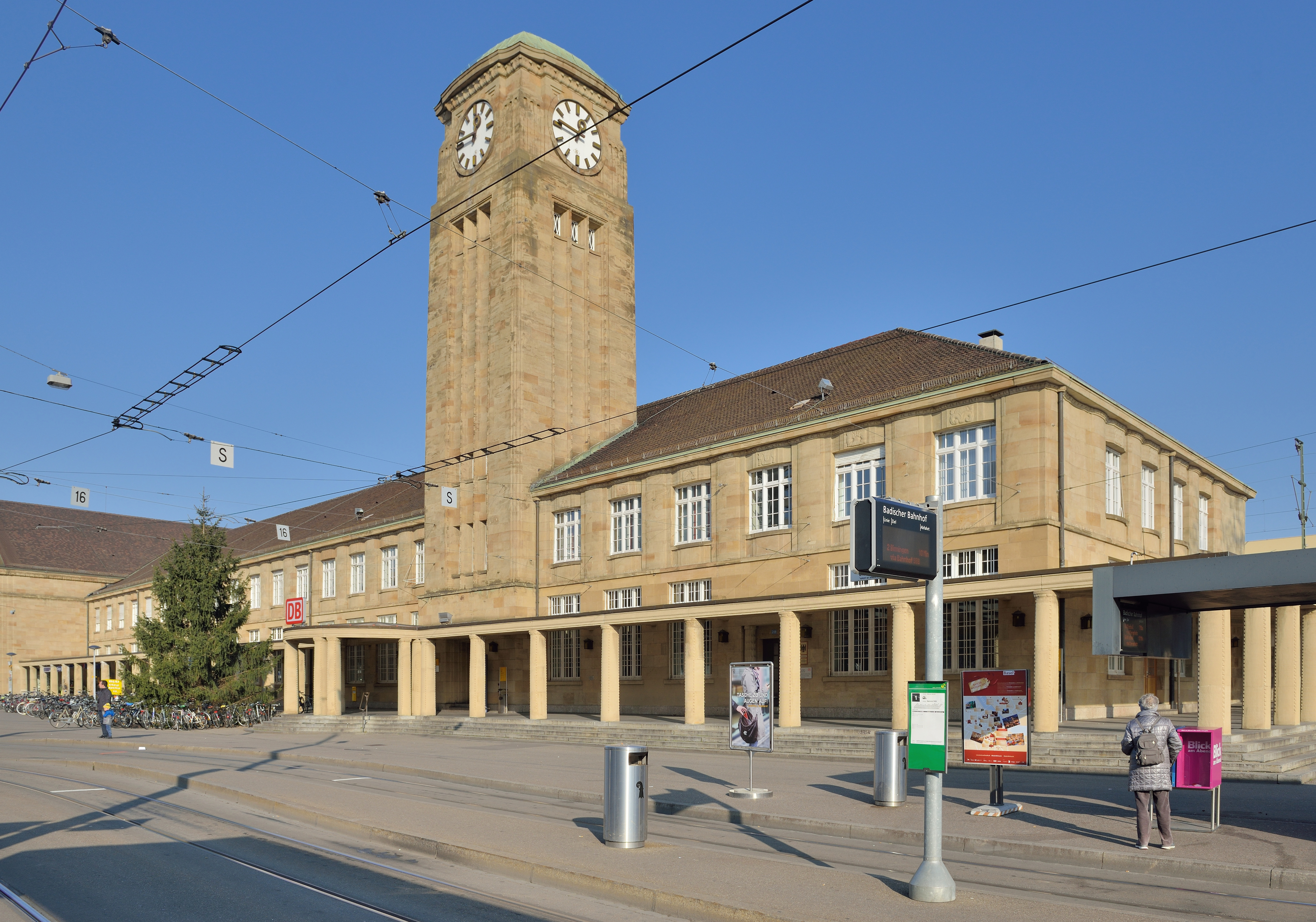
Basel Badischer Bahnhof (1908–1913), designed by Curjel & Moser

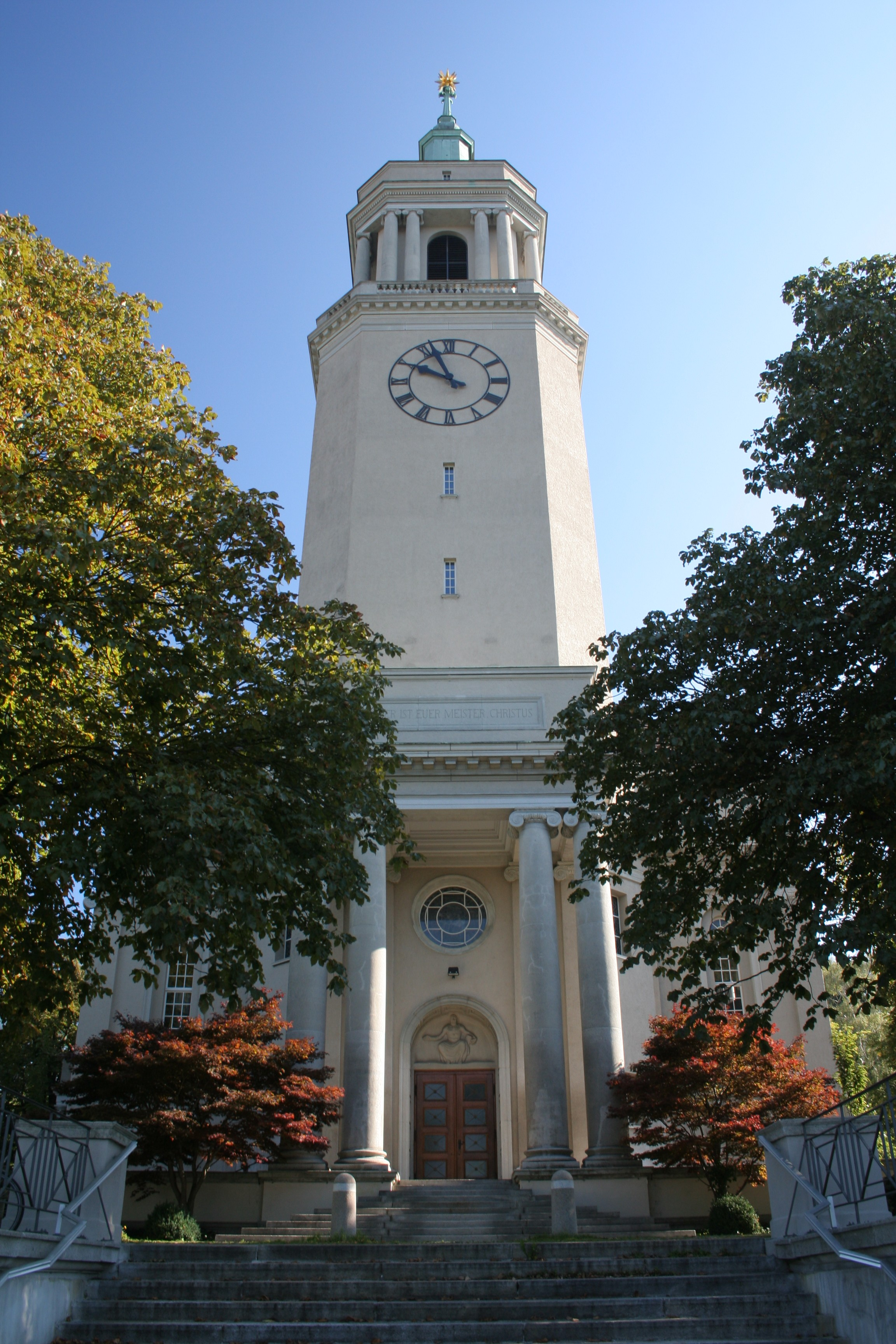
Fluntern Church in Zurich (1914–1920), designed by Moser

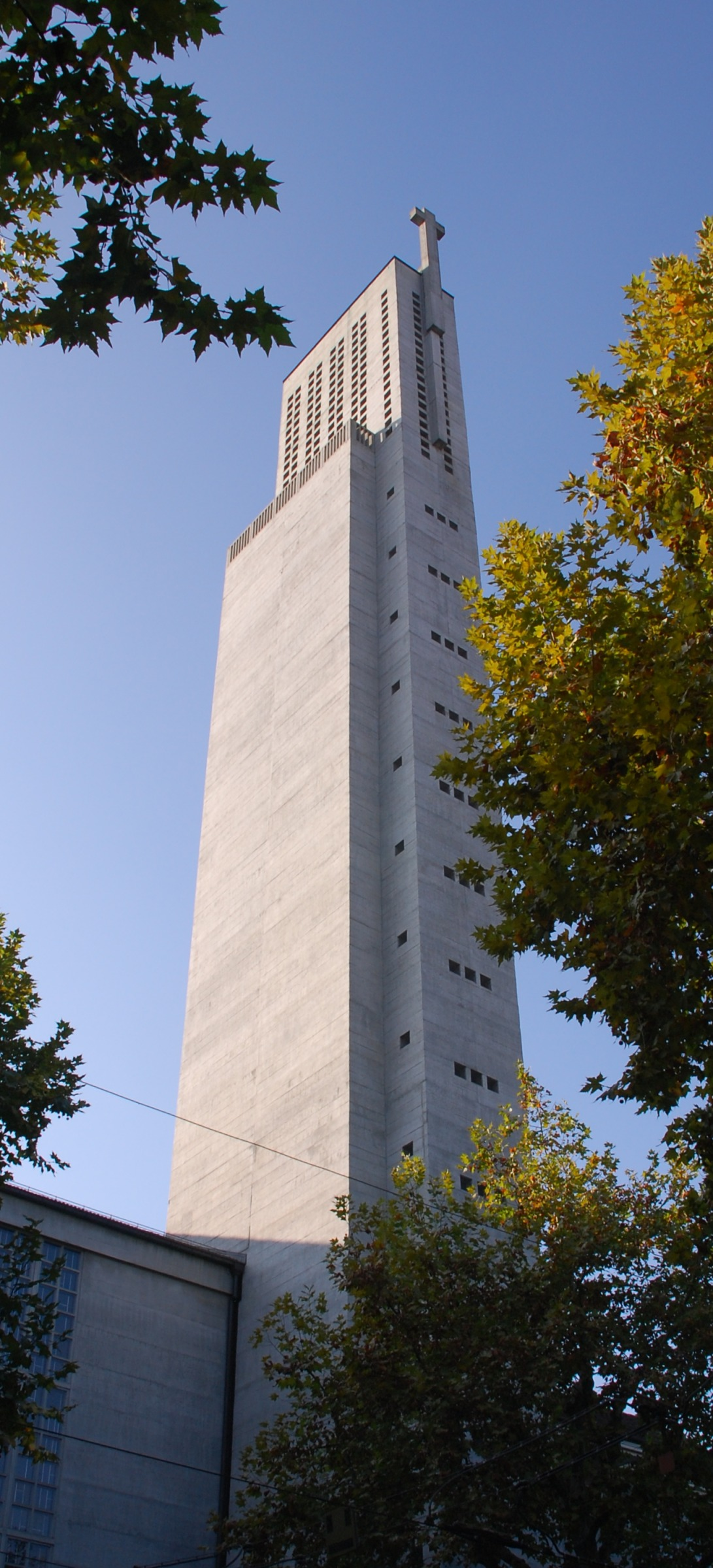
St. Anton Church in Basel (completed 1927), designed by Moser in the modernist style

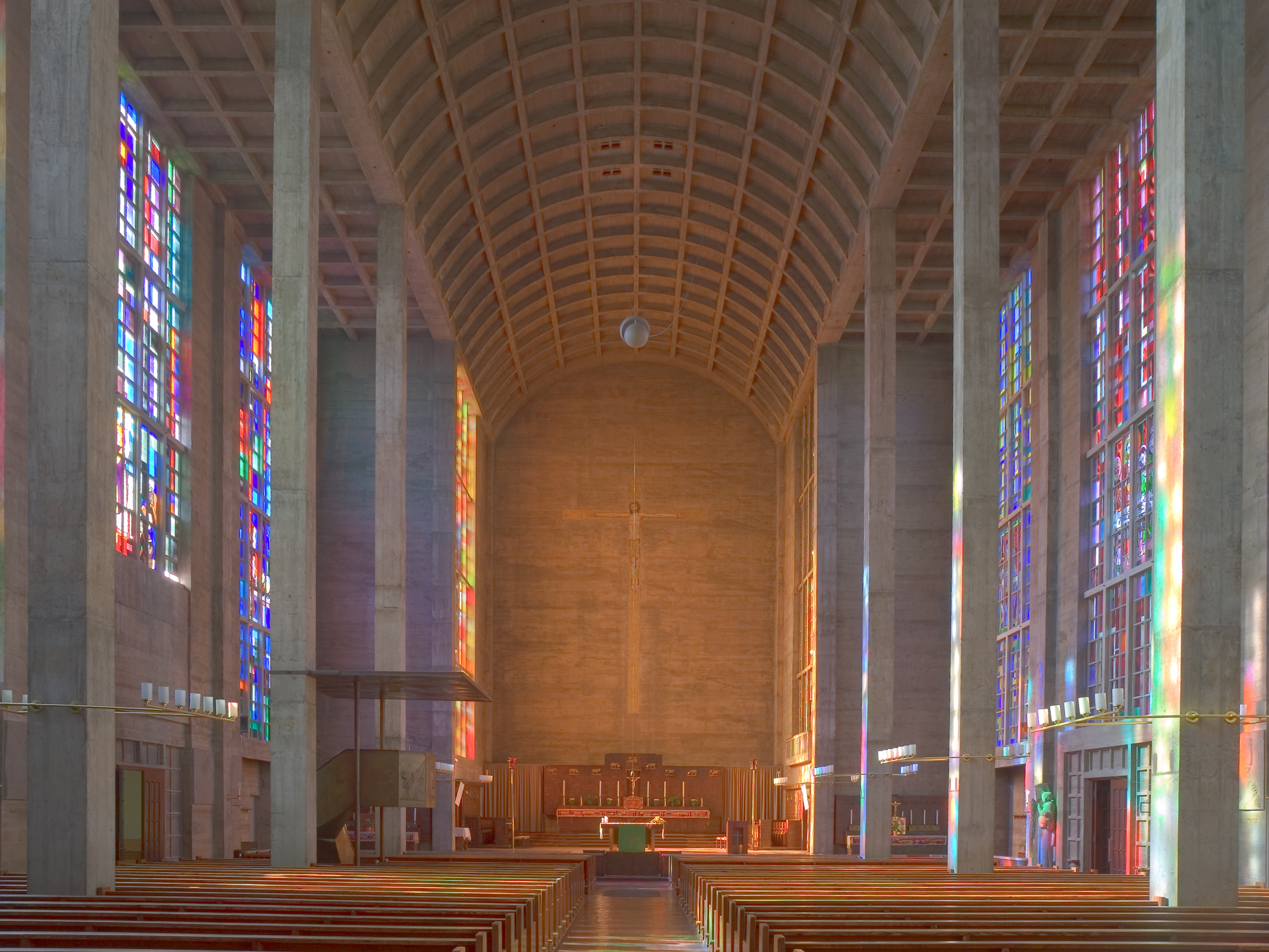
Interior of St. Anton Church in Basel
