= Monasticism in Switzerland =

Monasticism in Switzerland has a continuous history from late antiquity to the present, encompassing both eremitic and cenobitic forms of religious life. Monastic foundations appear in the territory of present-day Switzerland from the 5th century onward, first in the west under the influence of Lérins and Burgundian monasticism, and from the 7th century in the east through Frankish, Irish, and Alemanni foundations such as Saint Gall and Reichenau. Successive waves of reform—Cluniac, Cistercian, Premonstratensian, and the mendicant orders—shaped the medieval monastic landscape, before the Reformation led to the dissolution of houses in Reformed cantons in the 16th century. Monastic life flourished anew in Catholic cantons during the Catholic Reform and Baroque periods, suffered renewed setbacks during the Helvetic Republic and the 19th-century Kulturkampf, and recovered until the mid-20th century.

Numbers have declined sharply since the 1960s. As of the mid-2020s, around 200 monks and nuns live in Benedictine communities in Switzerland, roughly half the figure of two decades earlier. The remaining communities have engaged lay teachers, opened their schools to girls and non-Catholics, and increasingly turned to hosting retreats for outside visitors.

In its strict sense, monasticism refers to membership in a monastic order, with life within the cloister generally taking precedence over outward activity. Western monasticism, in renunciation of the world, sought a life of poverty, celibacy, and strict obedience to a superior representing Christ, understood as the most complete form of the imitation of Christ. In practice, this ideal proved difficult to realize. Adaptations to changing social, economic, and political conditions were unavoidable, but also carried the risk of decline. For this reason, reformers repeatedly sought to return to the ideal by going back to its origins. The branchings and new foundations of orders that occurred in every era can likewise be understood as responses to changing demands.

== Late Antiquity and the Early Middle Ages ==
Monasticism originated in its two basic forms—eremitism (hermitism) and cenobitism (life in a fraternal community)—in late 3rd- and 4th-century Egypt, Palestine, and Syria. It reached the Western Church as early as the 4th century. At the time of the Great Migrations, the influence of the monastery of Lérins, on the islands off Cannes, can be traced as far as present-day French-speaking Switzerland. Around 430, the brothers Romanus and Lupicinus founded an hermitage at Condat (today Saint-Claude) in what would later be the French Jura; the monastery that soon developed there followed the rules of Lérins and the institutions of John Cassian. Condat probably extended its influence as far as Romainmôtier in what would become Vaud. On the recommendation of the abbot of Lérins, the monastic community at the tomb of the martyr Maurice (Saint-Maurice) adopted the observance of Condat, adapted to western conditions, thereby joining the Rhône valley monasticism.

Influential bishops were the great patrons of southern Gaulish monasticism, while the Frankish-Irish monasticism that spread from around 600 was protected by Frankish lay magnates and Merovingian kings. The most important representative of the Irish monastic tradition, Columbanus, founded around 590 the abbeys of Luxeuil, Annegray, and Fontaines in the Belfort Gap. For the many Frankish nobles who entered these houses, Columbanus drew up his Regula monachorum, setting aside the strict Irish penitential discipline in favor of the milder Rule of Saint Benedict. This rule was initially also followed at Moutier-Grandval Abbey, founded thanks to a donation from the dukes of Alsace and settled directly from Luxeuil. Under increasing Frankish influence, the Christianization of the Alemanni—settled between the Romanized Burgundy and long-Christianized Rhaetia—was completed by the late 8th century. As part of the establishment of state organization, local nobles and high officials of the Frankish imperial aristocracy, such as the counts and dukes of Alsace and Alemannia, founded richly endowed and privileged monasteries, among them Reichenau and the cenobitic community on the site of the former hermitage of St. Gall. The first abbot of the latter, Otmar (from 719), is said to have adopted the Benedictine rule at the urging of the Frankish mayor of the palace. The priory of Lucerne dates from around 750, and Rheinau Abbey probably from shortly after 800.

The first women's convent in Alemannia was founded by Louis the German at Zürich in 853. In Rhaetia, the women's community of Cazis, founded around 700 by the Zaccons (Victorids), predated the male abbeys of Disentis and Pfäfers, richly endowed by the same dynasty in the first half of the 8th century. Charlemagne himself may have taken part in the foundation of Müstair Abbey on the road over the Ofen Pass, while the women's convent of Schänis was a foundation of the Rhaetian count Hunfrid (814/823). The Carolingian period brought a flowering of monasticism in southern Alemannia and Rhaetia, marked by relatively dense settlement of well-populated monasteries, increasingly clerical in character, by extensive land clearance, and by religious and cultural influence in which St. Gall surpassed all others.

Owing to the early medieval interweaving of religious, cultural, and political forces, the fate of monasteries depended on their closeness to the ruling house, which secured them legally and materially through grants of immunity, free abbatial elections, and donations, while at the same time placing them in the service of the realm; the St. Gall abbots Grimald and Salomo III, for example, served as chancellors of the East Frankish king. Einsiedeln Abbey also belongs to this Carolingian-Ottonian type of royal monastery. Founded in 934 as a private monastery by the Swabian ducal couple Hermann I and Reginlinde, it was raised to the rank of imperial abbey by Otto I in 947. After being shaped monastically and intellectually on the model of St. Gall, it joined the Lorraine imperial-monastic reform movement and became the leading center of reform in Swabia, sending many of its monks as abbots to other communities.

== High Middle Ages ==
The 11th and 12th centuries were marked by a revival of monasticism, oriented on the one hand toward the ideas of the Cluniac movement, founded at the Burgundian abbey of Cluny in 910, and on the other taking new paths with the Cistercians and Premonstratensians. Einsiedeln carried out its reform while remaining fully integrated into existing structures of authority, respecting the autonomy of each abbey and not seeking to form an association of dependent monasteries. Cluny, by contrast, from around 1000 sought to build the Ordo cluniacensis as a centralized association claiming exemption, in which numerous priories (alongside a few older abbeys) owed obedience to the grand abbot. In present-day Switzerland, twenty-six Cluniac houses can be identified. Only four—Payerne (under Cluny from 965), Romainmôtier (from 966), St. Victor near Geneva (from c. 1000), and St. Alban in Basel (before 1095)—had the rank of conventual priories with the minimum required complement of twelve monks for full monastic life. The smaller priories, often housing only one or two monks, could not sustain such a life.

Besides Cluny, other Savoyard and Burgundian abbeys covered western Switzerland with a network of twenty-two subordinate priories. Apart from the conventual priories of Lutry, Cossonay, Grandson, and St. Jean near Geneva, these served mainly to manage estates. The monastic landscape of western Switzerland thus differed from that of Alemannia and Rhaetia, even accounting for the new 11th- and 12th-century foundations there that were indirectly influenced by the Cluniac reform.

During the Investiture Controversy, anti-imperial south German dynastic families gathered around the anti-king Rudolf of Rheinfelden, duke of Swabia, began to favor the new reform centers of St. Blasien—which had taken up the Consuetudines of Fruttuaria in Piedmont—and Hirsau in the Black Forest. Cluniac influence was reflected in their demand that founders give up the system of proprietary churches, in favor of free election of the abbot and Vogt and the transfer of monasteries to the Holy See, which forced these houses to take sides in the struggle between emperor and pope. In both abbeys, the first abbots were removed and replaced by reformers. Even the Habsburg founding family converted their house monastery of Muri in Aargau into a priory dependent on St. Blasien, but under pressure from the community soon raised it again to the rank of abbey. The Nellenburg foundation of Allerheiligen in Schaffhausen was made by William of Hirsau one of the leading houses of his successful reform branch. The newly founded Benedictine houses of Erlach and Trub, and—by way of Muri—Engelberg, took on the imprint of St. Blasien, while Beinwil, Rheinau, Wagenhausen, and Fischingen came under the influence of Hirsau. Muri, Engelberg, and Allerheiligen in particular soon became important communities with lively intellectual life and leading scriptoria. Another feature of the high medieval wave of reform was the establishment of double monasteries (for example Muri, Engelberg, Rheinau, Wagenhausen, and Fischingen), in which the women's convent stood under the full jurisdiction and property administration of the abbot. The same was true of foundations on separate sites (Fahr under Einsiedeln, Rüegsau under Trub) and of women's convents later relocated.

Like the Cluniacs, the Cistercians—the second monastic reform movement of the High Middle Ages—had their roots in Burgundy. In conscious contrast to the "worldly" Cluny, Cîteaux, founded in 1098, rigorously emphasized the Benedictine ideals of solitude, poverty, and manual labor, and tightened the liturgical service. The Cistercians allowed individual abbeys a degree of autonomy, but linked them to the order as a whole through the annual general chapter of all abbots, which, according to the order's constitution (Charta caritatis), held supreme authority in matters of discipline and interpretation of the rule, and through a continuous filiation system in which the abbot of the founding abbey held the right of visitation in its daughter houses. The initially intensive direct cultivation of estates organized as granges was possible only through the institution of the conversi, the separation of choir monks (who were ordained priests) from subordinate lay brothers. From Burgundy, the Cistercians first gained a foothold in western Switzerland, where the nobility and the bishops of Geneva and Lausanne promoted their expansion. Bonmont (1131) was followed by Montheron (1126/1134), Hautcrêt (1134/1143), and Hauterive (1132/1137). In the Diocese of Constance, Frienisberg (1131/1138) and, considerably later, Kappel (1185), St. Urban (1194), and finally Wettingen (1220/1227) were added. Cistercian houses were located in wilderness sites already uninhabited or reclaimed by displacing peasants. Little is known of their monastic and intellectual life; the sources are abundant only on their land policy and economic management.

After early Christian eremitism had been revived in Italy by Saint Romuald and given a settled form of life by Peter Damian, a new synthesis of eremitic and cenobitic life emerged, which Saint Bruno of Cologne also realized in his foundation of La Grande Chartreuse in 1084. The Carthusian order likewise entered Switzerland first in the west, with the foundations of Oujon (1146) and La Valsainte (1295). The five later houses, including the important one in Kleinbasel, date only from the 14th or 15th century.

In the course of the Gregorian Reform of the Church, the norms laid down at Aachen in 816 for all clergy not belonging to the monastic state were revived. These required them to live as canons in community, with a common liturgy and an internal order of offices. By adopting the Rule of Saint Augustine in the 11th and 12th centuries, many clerical communities—as regular Augustinians or Augustinian canons—drew still closer to the ordo monasticus (for example Great St. Bernard, Saint-Maurice, and Kreuzlingen). The successors of Norbert of Xanten went a step further. In 1121, at Prémontré near Laon, he founded the order of Premonstratensians, modeled on the Cistercians (with a general chapter and filiation system) but for the first time organized territorially into provinces called circariae. The adaptable Augustinian rule allowed these rapidly successful canons to establish both houses of decidedly monastic and contemplative character and houses devoted to external pastoral care of the laity. The orientation of each house was shaped by local factors, as can be seen in the varying directions of the eight Swiss Premonstratensian houses (including Lac de Joux, Bellelay, St. Luzi in Chur, and Churwalden).

In the meantime, the rapidly growing towns had, through intensified material and intellectual exchange, given rise to an early capitalist economy and, with the young universities, an intellectual awakening. Women also took part in the religious movement of the 12th and 13th centuries. Religious fervor seized wide circles of laypeople, who were drawn to the ideal of a vita apostolica lived in poverty, but easily slipped into heresy. The Church thus faced entirely new tasks, and the Fourth Lateran Council (1215) obliged the bishops to provide additional preachers and confessors and to root out heretics. The secular and regular clergy were in no way prepared for this task. The four mendicant orders—the Dominicans, Franciscans, Augustinian Eremites, and the Carmelites, the last of which had no houses in Swiss towns—stepped in. They had to draw up constitutions enabling them to work in the world for the pope and the bishops. Favored by the nobility and the urban patriciate, these new orders long attracted the best minds, while the older male orders were pushed to the margins.

== Late Middle Ages and the Reformation ==
Monasticism had already passed the peak of its development in the 12th century. Signs of decline appeared in the 13th century, and in the 14th and 15th centuries hardly any community was spared the general decadence. The causes were both individual and structural. The vows of poverty, obedience, and chastity made high demands on the individual that were difficult to sustain over time in a changing environment, especially in noble communities. Violations of the rule and the constitutions of the orders became more frequent. The requirement of poverty was circumvented by allowing monks to hold private property inside or outside the community and to bequeath it. The widespread practice of dividing the community's property into individual benefices undermined common life and encouraged the conversion of monasteries into secular chapters of canons (for example St. Leodegar in Lucerne). Many houses, impoverished and indebted as a result of mismanagement by their superiors and the dissipation of monastic property, faced serious internal conflicts, and sometimes revolts of monks against self-interested or incompetent abbots. Crop failures, epidemics, and wars hit the monasteries materially, in personnel, and morally. In the older orders, the agriculturally based material foundation entered into crisis. Houses sought to enter the monetary economy by granting estates in hereditary lease and by buying annuities, often financed only through the private means of community members. As powers in the world, monasteries could not escape the conflicts between emperor and pope (under Frederick II and Louis the Bavarian). The Great Western Schism (1378–1417) split them into rival observances, with allegiance often determined by the territorial prince. For the monasteries of German-speaking Switzerland, the displacement of the Habsburgs as territorial lords proved significant, as it allowed the cities and rural cantons to expand their autonomy. In the 15th century, interventions in the management of monastic property—through the appointment of administrators or Kastvögte—multiplied, as did interferences in internal affairs, especially abbatial elections, in which foreign or unsuitable candidates were sometimes imposed on communities. In western Switzerland, the counts (and later dukes) of Savoy allowed within their territories the system of commendation, which was harmful to monasteries.

Even so, the late Middle Ages also saw great efforts at monastic reform. During the Council of Constance in 1417, the Benedictine province of Mainz-Bamberg, to which the German-Swiss houses belonged, adopted sweeping reform measures: regular visitations, strict enclosure, personal poverty, and a common refectory, dormitory, and choir office. The reform movements of Melk in Lower Austria and Kastl in Bavaria temporarily affected Schaffhausen, Stein am Rhein, Einsiedeln, and St. Gall. Among the Cluniacs and Cistercians, the initiative for reform repeatedly came from the general chapters of Cluny and Cîteaux. Serious efforts at renewal were not lacking, but they were not sustained, and they faltered in the second half of the 15th century and the early 16th. In numerous communities the number of monks shrank so alarmingly that they were threatened with extinction. Initiatives by urban authorities or by the Confederate protecting cantons to revive the failed reform bore little fruit.

While the 15th century had still believed monasticism to be reformable, the Reformers of the 16th century rejected it in principle, declaring it a human work without salvific value and devoid of any biblical foundation. For various reasons, the majority of religious responded to the new teachings with reserve or rejection. A strong minority—especially among the abbots—welcomed the Reformation ideas, either spontaneously or after some hesitation. Only exceptionally, however, did entire communities dissolve themselves of their own accord, as at Kappel and the Fraumünster chapter in Zurich. In all the Reformed cantons the council put an end to a thousand years of monasticism through secularization. The authorities of the Catholic cantons, by contrast, took the monasteries under their protection and demanded the restoration of the monasteries in the common lordships; this was carried out after the Catholic victory in the Second War of Kappel (Counter-Reformation).

== Catholic Reform and the Baroque period ==
The local reform efforts of the late Middle Ages did not suffice for an effective renewal of monasticism. The forces required for this could only come from the new, non-monastic order of the Society of Jesus (Catholic Reform). In the Catholic cantons, the Jesuits successfully built up a system of higher education; their newly founded colleges in Lucerne (1577) and Fribourg (1580) soon counted hundreds of students. The reform-minded new generation of the surviving monasteries also came largely from these schools, and was often sent on to the Jesuit university of Dillingen for further study. Shaped by the Jesuit spirit, many abbots set their houses on the path of reform after 1580, with the support and under the control of the lay authorities and of the nuncios resident in Lucerne from 1579, who claimed the right of visitation formerly exercised by the bishops.

The foundation of the Swiss Congregation of Benedictines in 1602 strengthened the reform and the solidarity of the order, and promoted unification along Jesuit lines through orientation toward papal Rome in liturgy (a uniform breviary, missal, and ritual), style of piety, and theology, with St. Gall taking the lead. Most monasteries maintained this direction even after they distanced themselves from the Jesuits in the late 17th century and preferred to train their novices in their own houses. Learned Baroque scholasticism followed the strictly systematic method of the Jesuits, which channeled the thinking of the monks and left little room for other approaches, such as the critical historical scholarship developed by the French Maurists. Although the education of the monks reached a considerable level, the monastic libraries were carefully developed, and music and theater were eagerly cultivated, intellectual achievement was generally not the hallmark of this flourishing monastic age. It was rather the building fever of the Baroque prelates, driven as much by a need for prestige and by Roman triumphalism as by concern for discipline and genuine piety. The other, far fewer surviving Cistercian and Premonstratensian houses also took part in this culture of magnificence and festivity.

== From the Enlightenment to the 20th century ==
In the second half of the 18th century, Enlightenment, Gallican, Jansenist, and Josephinist ideas spread also in Switzerland, prompting criticism of Baroque monasticism and of what was judged its inadequate engagement in education and social work. A growing interest in the natural sciences emerged in the monasteries as well, though not to the extent seen at Neresheim in Württemberg or Kremsmünster in Upper Austria. A few abbots and monks maintained friendly contacts with enlightened-patriotic circles in the Reformed cities, but the majority remained intellectually attached to Baroque, anti-Enlightenment traditions, which prevented them from understanding the signs of the times: they saw the Revolution of 1789 as a purely French matter. Many monasteries suffered damage during the upheavals of 1798–1799, and all were forced to pay contributions. The authorities of the Helvetic Republic ordered the sequestration of monastic property as national assets, and the prohibition on receiving novices and electing superiors was meant to bring about the disappearance of all religious houses. Yet as early as 1802–1803 the monasteries were reoccupied, with the exception of the abbey of St. Gall, sacrificed to the new canton in 1805.

The Federal Pact of 1815 guaranteed the existence of the monasteries, but did nothing to change the negative judgment of monasticism in enlightened and liberal circles. To legitimize themselves to the outside world, Benedictines and Cistercians made considerable efforts in public education. Nevertheless, liberals and radicals abolished the monasteries in several cantons: in Aargau in 1841 (the measure was provisionally suspended for women's houses, in the Aargau Monastery Dispute), in Lucerne in 1838 and 1848, in Ticino and Fribourg in 1848, in Solothurn in 1857 and 1874, and in Zurich in 1862. The Federal Constitution of 1848 no longer included any guarantee; that of 1874 (art. 52) even forbade "the founding of new convents or religious orders and the restoration of those that have been suppressed" (Special Provisions). Feeling threatened in their existence, several institutions went into exile or founded daughter houses abroad (Einsiedeln, Engelberg). Despite the restrictions of the Kulturkampf and competition from many new orders and congregations (such as the Redemptorists), the communities that remained in Switzerland or survived abroad (Muri at Gais near Bolzano, Mariastein at Delle and Bregenz) experienced a new period of flourishing that lasted from the second half of the 19th into the mid-20th century. The confessional milieu and the largely agricultural social structure of the Catholic cantons favored recruitment, allowing the monasteries to develop their schools, which—after the expulsion of the Jesuits—took on the role of gymnasium for the Catholic elites. Even during the Second World War, the Cistercians of Wettingen-Mehrerau and the Benedictines of Bregenz, driven out by the Nazis, were allowed to return to Hauterive and Mariastein. Mission Benedictines from Sankt Ottilien settled at Uznach and Belgian Benedictines at Le Bouveret, with smaller settlements at Muri and Fischingen.

This period of flourishing came to an abrupt end in the 1960s. The far-reaching intellectual, social, and economic transformation destabilized both the Church and monasticism, even though, since the repeal of the confessional exception articles from the Federal Constitution in 1973, no legal obstacles remained and a few new houses were established (for example Fischingen in 1977). The abbatial schools, now also open to girls and to non-Catholics, contributed little to the next generation of monks, so that the aging communities had to engage lay teachers or give up their schools altogether (Altdorf, Appenzell, Sarnen). On the other hand, the men's communities, and in part the women's, found a new mission in opening their houses to seekers as "houses of silence" for temporary retreats. As of the mid-2020s, around 200 monks and nuns live in Benedictine communities in Switzerland, roughly half the figure of two decades earlier.

== Bibliography ==
- R. Pfister, Kirchengeschichte der Schweiz, 3 vols., 1964–1984.
- Helvetia Sacra, III/1–3; IV/3.
- Theologische Realenzyklopädie, vol. 23, pp. 143–193.
- L. Vischer et al., eds., Histoire du christianisme en Suisse, 1995 (German original 1994).
- La soppressione dei conventi nel Cantone Ticino, 1995.
- K. S. Frank, Geschichte des christlichen Mönchtums, 5th ed. 1996.
