= Cazis Convent =

Swiss convent in Graubünden

Coordinates: 46.7209°N 9.4296°E

- Kloster Cazis
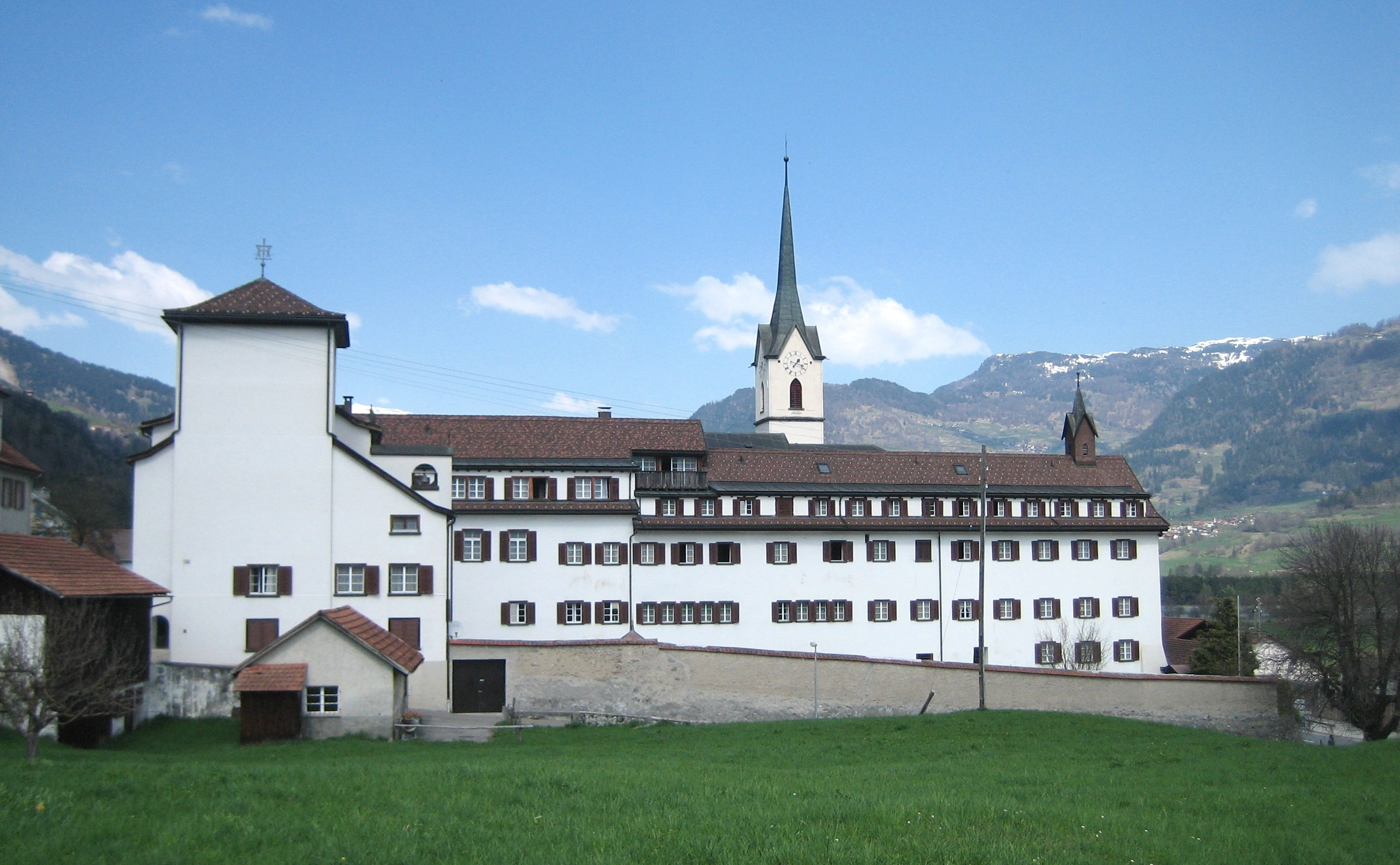

Religion
- Affiliation: Catholic Church
- Rite: Latin
- Ecclesiastical or organizational status: Active

Location
- Location: Cazis, Grisons, Switzerland
- Interactive map of Cazis Convent

Architecture
- Founder: Bishop of Chur
- Completed: c. 700

Cazis Convent (German: Kloster Cazis) is a chapter of canonesses, following the Rule of Saint Augustine from 1156 and a Dominican priory from 1647, located in the center of the municipality of Cazis, near Thusis, in the western part of the Diocese of Chur.

The place is recorded in the early 9th century as Gaczes, at the end of the 9th century as Chazes, and in 926 as Cacias. Its patron saint was Saint Peter (926), and Saints Peter and Paul in the modern era.

== History ==
Founded around the year 700 by the bishop of Chur on lands belonging to the Church, Cazis is the oldest of the women's convents, and indeed of all the convents, of the diocese. In its early period it probably fluctuated between canonical and monastic status.

In 1156, Bishop Adelgott imposed on Cazis, then a secular chapter, the Rule of Saint Augustine and placed it under the obedience of the Premonstratensians of Saint Lucius, who took over the appointment of the superior, the administration, and the spiritual direction. This measure did not, however, mean either incorporation into Saint Lucius or the introduction of the Premonstratensian rule. On the contrary, the convent continued to depend directly on the bishop, and seems to have detached itself from Saint Lucius as early as the 13th century.

By the end of the 14th century, the canonesses again had property of their own. As a result of the Articles of Ilanz of 1526, which forbade the convent to receive novices, it gradually emptied; it was secularized by the Grey League after the death of the last abbess in 1570.

During the Bündner Wirren at the time of the Thirty Years' War, Catholic efforts to restore the convent led to the installation of Dominican nuns in 1647. Until 1751, the nuns had to settle disputes with the jurisdiction of Thusis and the community of Cazis over property and rights of use.

A fire in 1768 destroyed a large part of the church and the convent.

A girls' boarding school was briefly opened in 1855, and a domestic-science school in 1955.

== Lands and advocacy ==
The convent's lands lay above all in the Heinzenberg (five farms), the Domleschg and the Safiental (thirteen farms), and also in the Albula valley, the Oberhalbstein, and the Val Venosta. The convent never managed to free itself from the bishopric. The advocacy was held by the episcopal Viztum of the Domleschg. Among the ministerial families to whom this office fell, the Schauensteins, who have their burial vault in the convent, stood out in the 14th century. The advocacy over the Safien valley, attached to the county of Schams, had however been enfeoffed by the bishop to the barons of Vaz and their successors; it passed to the barons of Rhäzüns in 1396 following private wars.

== Parish and buildings ==
As part of his reform efforts, Bishop Adelgott incorporated into the convent in 1156 the chapels of Saint Martin in Cazis and Saint Alban in Carschenna (municipality of Sils im Domleschg), separating them, along with the convent, from the mother parish of Hochrialt (Saint John at Hohenrätien). In 1359, Cazis ceded its lands in the Val Venosta to the bishop in exchange for the patronage of Hochrialt. In 1499, the convent church, Saint Peter, then under reconstruction, replaced Saint Martin as the parish church. Rectangular in plan, Saint Martin has retained its 7th- or 8th-century appearance, while Saint Peter retains essentially the form of its flamboyant Gothic reconstruction, completed in 1504. The convent was originally probably situated to the northwest of the present site, at a place called Claustra vedra ("old convent"). It was certainly moved after the fire of 1369.

== Bibliography ==
=== Sources ===
- L. Joos, "Die beiden Safien-Urbare des Klosters Cazis von 1495 und 1502 im Gemeindearchiv von Safien-Platz", in Bündner Monatsblatt, 1959, pp. 277–332.

=== Works ===
- W. Schubert, "Studien zur Geschichte des Klosters Cazis", in Bündner Monatsblatt, 1960, pp. 198–225.
- L. Blöchlinger, Das Dominikanerinnenkloster Cazis, 1980.
- U. P. Casutt et al., Geschichte der Pfarrei Cazis, 1983.
- Helvetia Sacra, III/1, pp. 253–256.
