= Schauenstein family =

Swiss noble family from Grisons

Schauenstein von Schauenstein
- Current region: Grisons, Switzerland
- Founded: 1258 (first attested)
- Estates: Schauenstein Castle (Masein), Heinzenberg, Domleschg
- Dissolution: 1742

The Schauenstein family, also known as von Schauenstein, was a family of knights linked to the cathedral chapter of Chur, residing at Schauenstein Castle (in the municipality of Masein) and holding substantial property in the Heinzenberg and the Domleschg. The first members mentioned are the brothers Burkhard and Gottfried in 1258. As ministerials of the bishops of Chur, the Schauensteins sat in the chapter and were buried in the cathedral. In the 14th century, as Viztume in the Domleschg and bailiffs of Kloster Cazis, they were temporarily the most powerful ministerials of the chapter of Chur in the Domleschg. They allied themselves with families of the lower episcopal nobility.

== History ==
From 1320 onward, one branch took the name of Ehrenfels Castle; in 1350 the Schauensteins owned Unter-Tagstein Castle (in the municipality of Masein), and in 1418 they received the castle of Campell as an episcopal fief. The Schauensteins took part in the private war of Rhäzüns, a conflict linked to territorial politics in the Domleschg involving the barons of Rhäzüns, the counts of Werdenberg, and the chapter of Chur.

Until the mid-17th century, the Schauensteins belonged to the inner circle of ruling families of the Grisons. Several of them were bailiffs of Maienfeld or held the highest offices in the Valtellina. They acquired the lordship of Trins, comprising Tamins, Reichenau, and Trin, in 1583; the family settled there and renamed it the lordship of Reichenau in 1616, after Trin had bought back its feudal rights. From 1608 to 1701, the Schauensteins also held the lordship of Haldenstein.

In 1612, Thomas received the title of baron from Emperor Matthias II. Supporters of France, the Schauensteins repeatedly entered its service.

== Decline ==
From the mid-17th century onward, the Schauensteins underwent a certain economic and political decline, and after 1650 they hardly held any offices in the Valtellina. The family died out in 1742 with Count Thomas Franz; the inheritance passed to his nephew Johann Anton Buol.

== Bibliography ==
=== Archival sources ===
- Bischöfliches Archiv Chur.
- Staatsarchiv Graubünden.

=== Works ===
- P. E. Grimm, Die Anfänge der Bündner Aristokratie im 15. und 16. Jahrhundert, 1981.
- S. Färber, Der bündnerische Herrenstand im 17. Jahrhundert, 1983.
- O. P. Clavadetscher, W. Meyer, Das Burgenbuch von Graubünden, 1984.
- Handbuch der Bündner Geschichte, vols. 1–2.
