= Hohenrätien Castle =

Castle in Sils im Domleschg, Canton of Graubünden, Switzerland

- Hochrialt, Hohen Rätien
- Sils im Domleschg
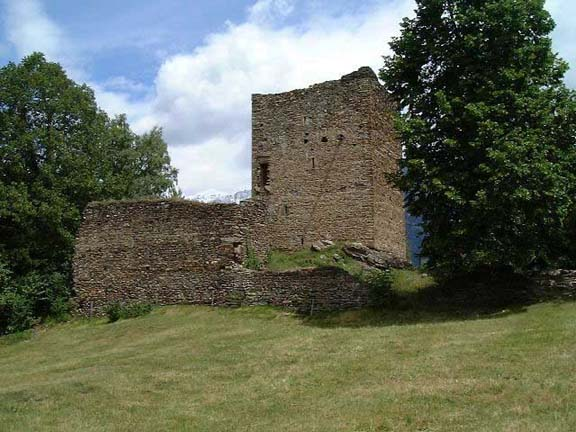
- Hohenrätien Castle

Site information
- Type: hill castle
- Code: CH-GR
- Condition: ruin

Location
- Coordinates: 46°41′31″N 9°26′41″E
- Height: 946 m above the sea

Site history
- Built: 11th century

Hohenrätien Castle is a castle in the municipality of Sils im Domleschg of the Canton of Graubünden in Switzerland. It is a Swiss heritage site of national significance.

== History ==
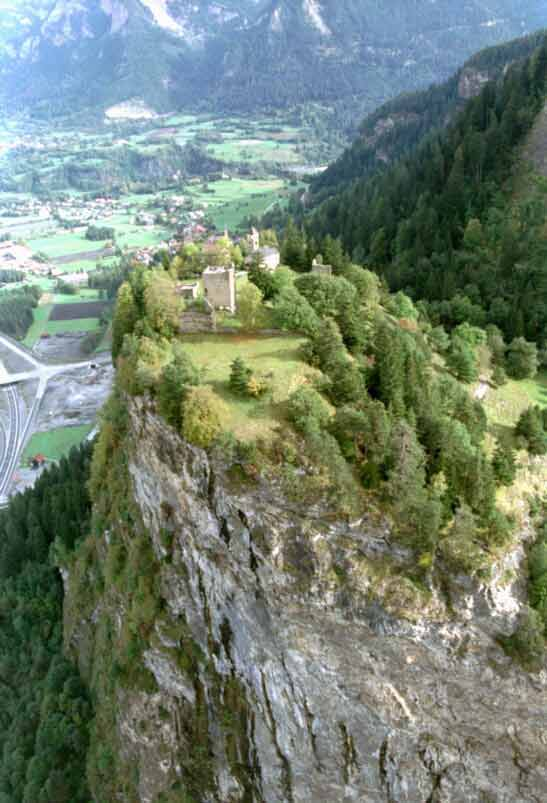
Hohenrätien Castle sits high above the valley

The castle was built on a rock wall that rises 250 m (820 ft) above the Viamala river and the important roads over the San Bernardino and Splügen Passes. A steep path leads from the valley floor to the eastern side of the wall. The area was inhabited during the Bronze and Iron Ages. During the Roman era the current castle site was a religious site and by the 4th or 5th century there was a church on the site. It is unknown whether the church was originally built as a Christian church or was a temple to Mithras that was converted into a church. By the 5th century a baptistery had been added and it was known as the Church of St. John. The church remained in operation over the next 1000 years. It was the parish church for the left side of the Rhine river until 1500. A first ring wall was probably added around the same time.

By the High Middle Ages the church was the center of a large parish and was also used as a refuge from attack. A number of fortifications were built in the 11th century for the parish vogt. They included a two-story stone house which eventually became the main tower, repairs and expansion of the outer ring wall and may have included the south-east tower and the priest's tower. In the 13th century the main tower was expanded and surrounded with an inner wall. Storage and work shops were added around the tower. This inner castle became known as Hochrialt, possibly connected with the Lords of Rialt who first appeared in 1170 at Niederrialt Castle in Cazis. Despite the expansion of the 13th century, much of the castle was abandoned at the beginning of the 14th. Possibly an earthquake in 1295 may have damaged the castle enough to make it uninhabitable. Another theory is that the castle needed a nearby town to support it and the lack of water combined with a drop in traffic over the Viamala road led to the town and then the castle being abandoned. After the castle was abandoned, the bishop's representatives left the priest's tower and moved to Fürstenau Castle.

In the 14th century the Rialt family apparently died out. Around the same time, in 1359, the patronage rights over the church were granted to Cazis Priory. In 1410 a register of church property recorded that Hoch-Rialt was an abandoned fortress. At some point in the late 14th or early 15th century the south-east was destroyed in a fire. In 1473 the communities of Thusis, Masein and Cazis agreed to build a road on the other side of the river which completely bypassed Hohenrätien and removed any motivation to rebuild. In 1480 the castle ruins were inherited by the Jecklin family. The priest's tower continued to be the home of the parish priest until 1505 when the last priest left. In 1573 the name Hohenrätien was first given to the castle by a humanist scribe who tried to connect the castle to Raetus, the legendary ancestor of the Rhaetian people. In 1581 the von Hohenrealta family inherited the castle and surrounding lands.

In the late 19th century a project to build an aerial tramway from Thusis to Hohenrätien was considered, but not built. However, developers built an alpine restaurant in an arched roof basement in the castle ruins. It remained in operation until 1914 and traces of the restaurant are still visible today. In 1973 the Hohenrealta family foundation began working with cantonal authorities and local volunteers to restore and excavate the castle. In more than a dozen stages roofs were built over the buildings and the towers were cleaned and reinforced. Archaeological excavations in 1997 and 2001 explored the Roman and early medieval ruins around the castle site. Today, the church, baptistry and castle can be rented for a variety of events.

== Castle site ==
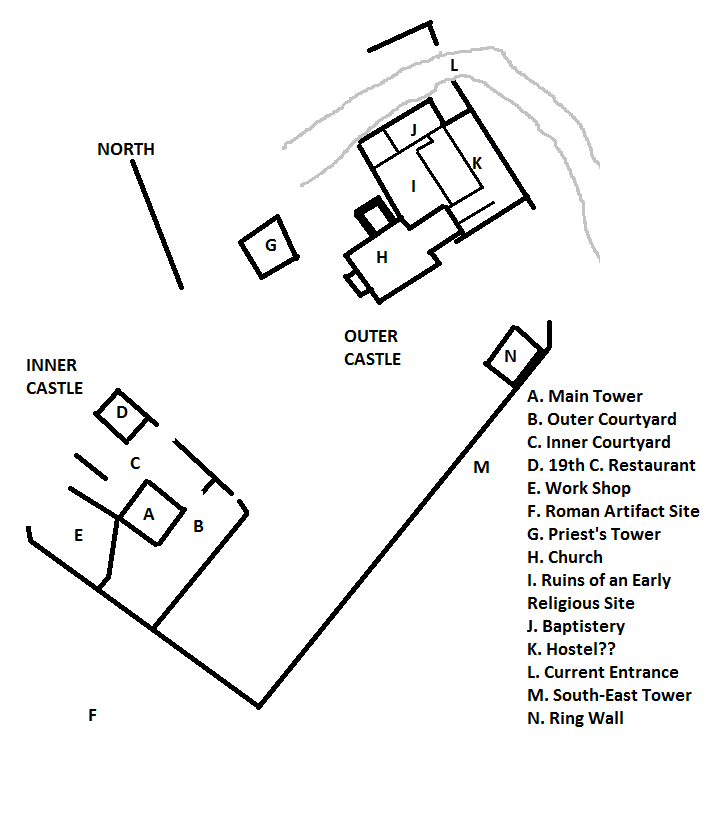
Plan of Hohenrätien Castle

The Inner Castle is on the south western side of the ridge. In the center of the castle is the main tower, which has a cistern on the ground floor that could hold about 30,000 L (7,900 US gal). The second story was used for storing supplies. The main entrance and reception hall was on the third story, along with a large fireplace and a latrine. The fourth story was a single, large bedroom. The modern renovations of the tower changed the interior, while leaving the exterior unchanged. The tower was roofed over with a glass roof. Wooden platforms were built around the walls at the same height as the original floor, though the center was left open to allow light into the entire tower.

== Gallery ==
Troops march past Hohenrätien 1914-1918

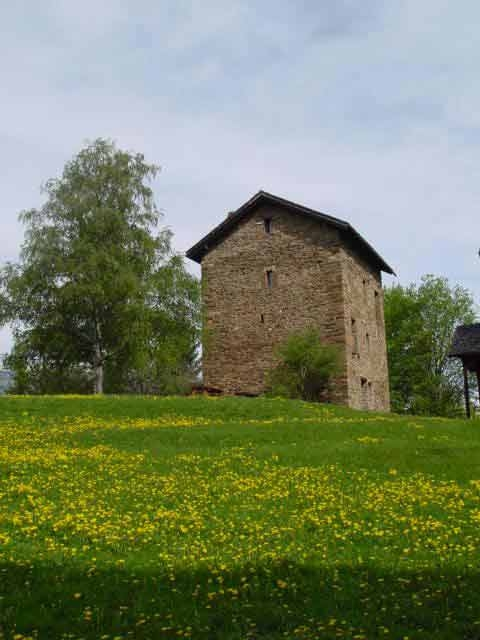
Priest's Tower

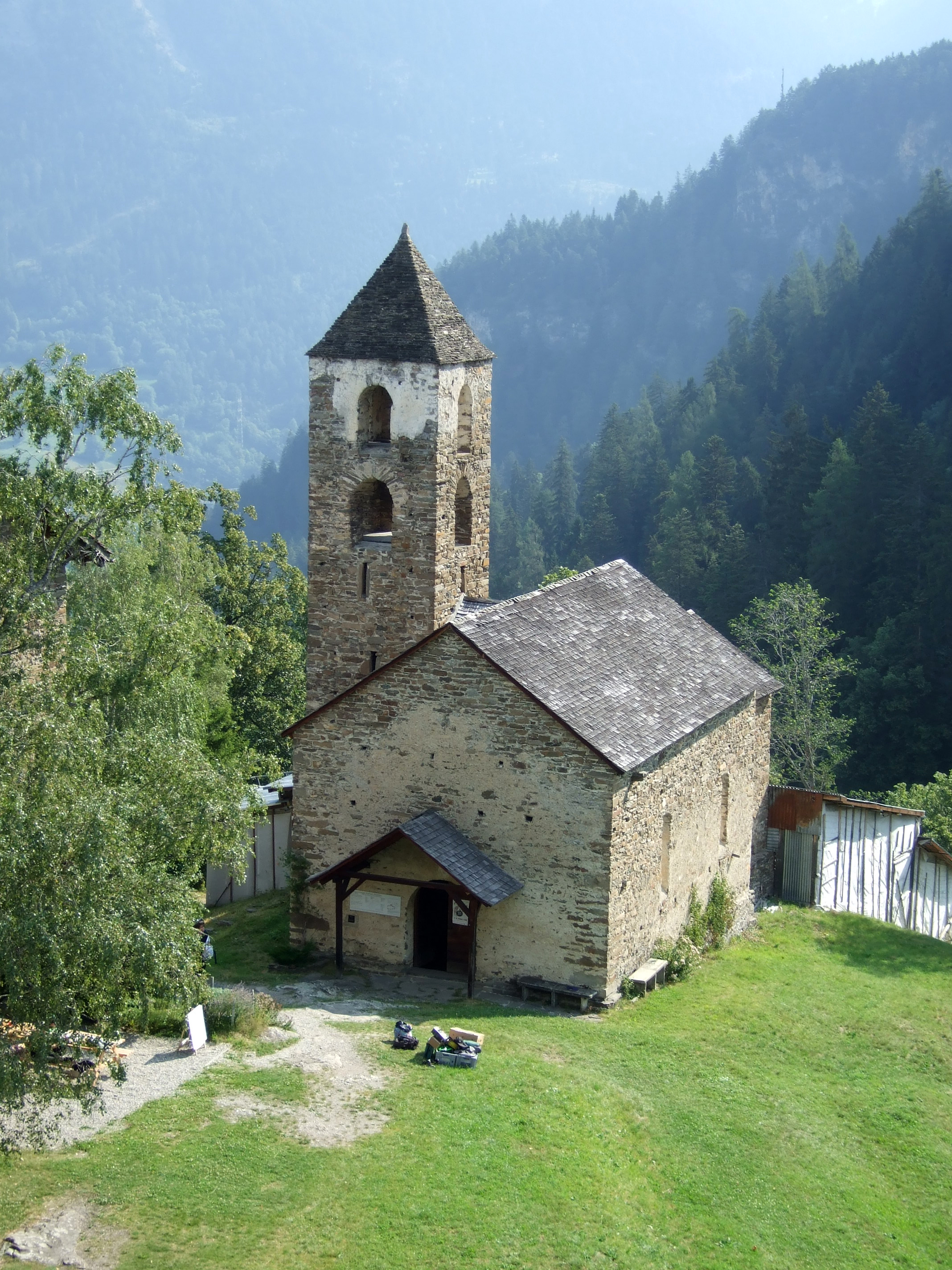
Church of St. John

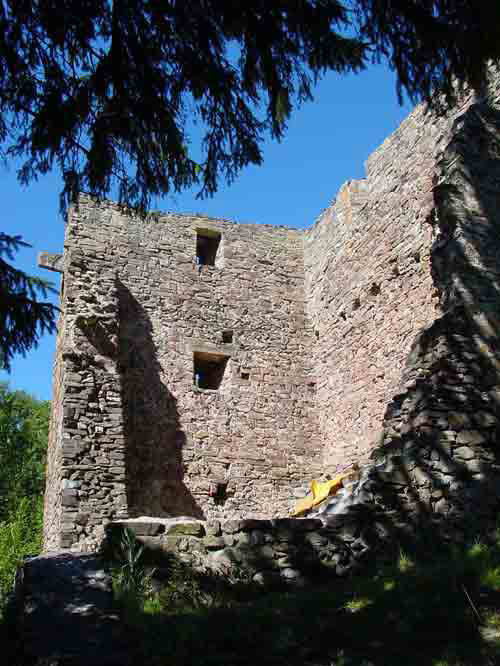
Ruins of the corner tower

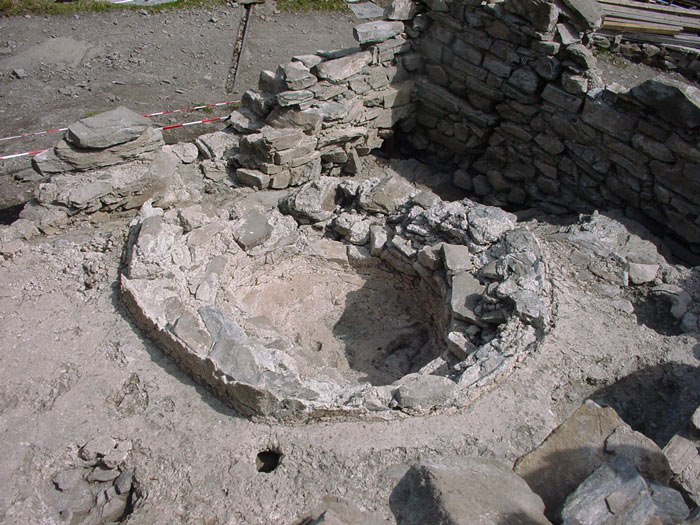
5th century baptismal font

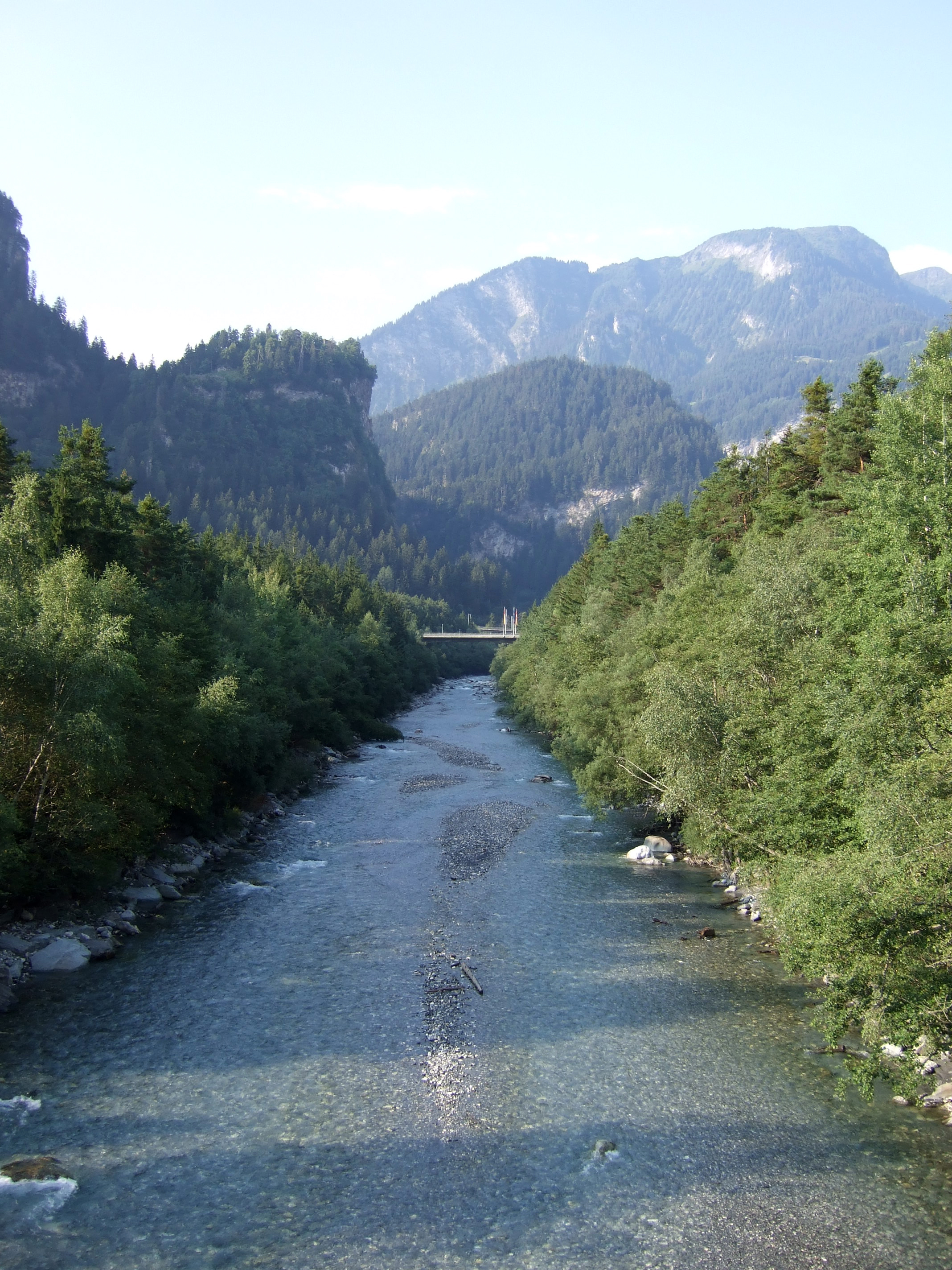
Hinterrhein river with Hohenrätien in the background

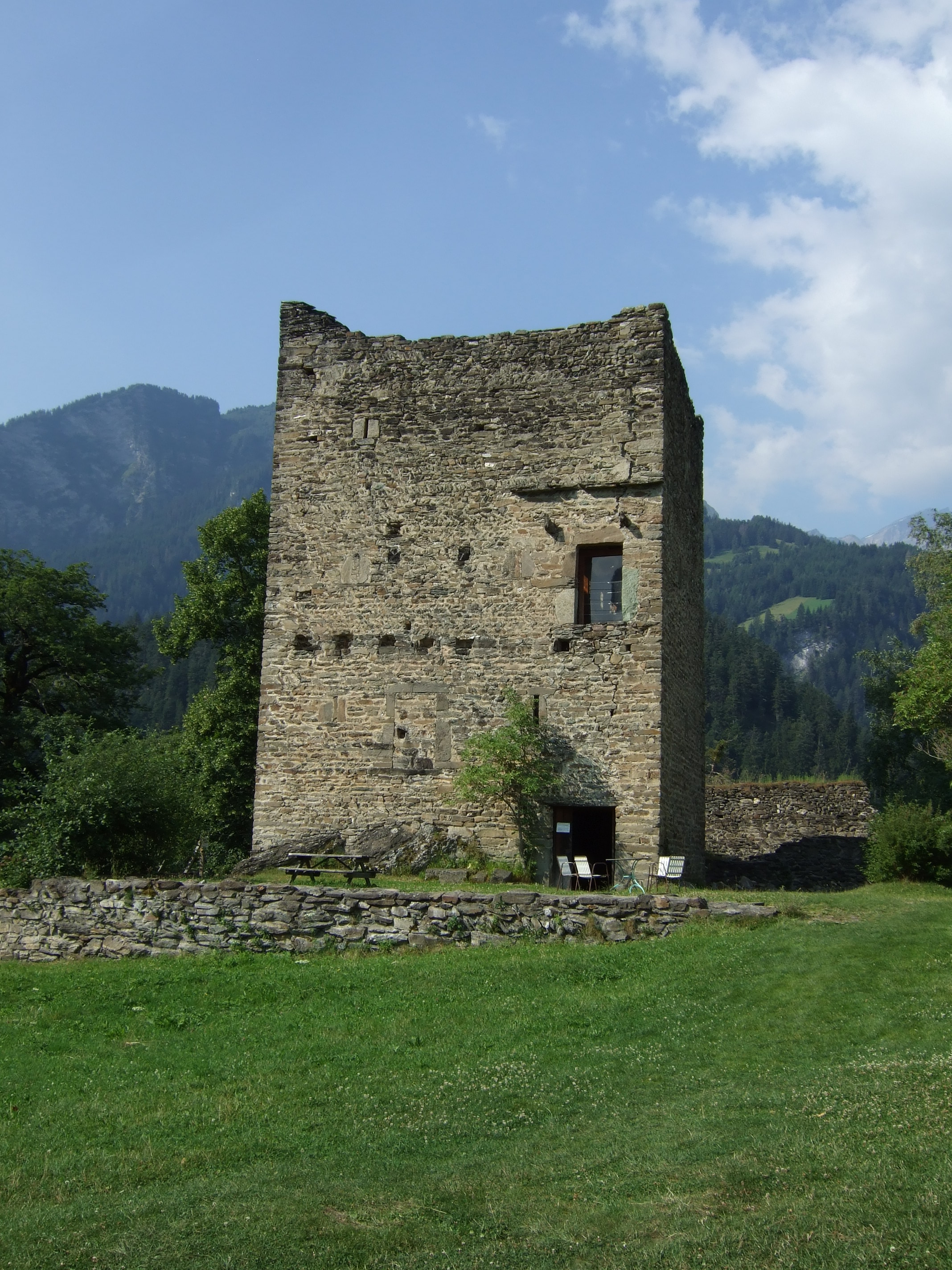
Main tower at Hohenrätien

== See also ==
- List of castles in Switzerland
