= Kappel Abbey =

Abbey in Zurich, Switzerland

Coordinates: 47.22°N 8.52°E

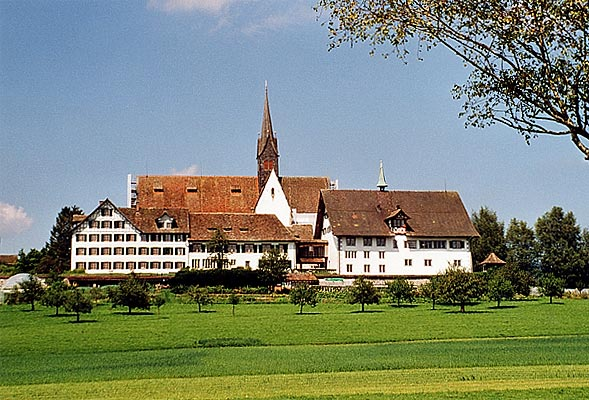
Kappel Abbey

Kappel Abbey is a former Cistercian monks monastery located in Kappel am Albis in the Swiss canton of Zurich.

== Foundation of the abbey ==
Kappel Abbey is first mentioned in 1185 by Bishop Hermann II of Constance. The abbey was founded by the Freiherr of Eschenbach. The name was derived from a chapel in which, according to a foundation legend, hermits used to live. In 1211, Pope Innocent III gave the monastery the Privilegium commune Cisterciense. Between the 13th to 15th centuries the Abbey received several Imperial and Royal privileges.

On the site of the original church (of which parts are preserved in the present structure), a new church was started in about 1255. This early gothic building wouldn't be completed until the early 14th century. The oldest part of the monastery is the so-called core of the administration buildings, which were probably built in 1209/10 as a hospital (later the residence of the abbot and the prior).

The spiritual and economic golden-age lasted until the middle of the 14th century. Through donations from the landed gentry (Hallwyl, Hünenberg Bonstetten, Hinwil, Baldegg, Uerzlikon, Gessler and Habsburg-Laufenburg families), purchase and exchange the Abbey had numerous, widely scattered properties. With the help of a number of lay brothers, the Abbey ran a number of businesses. These included a vineyard on Lake Zurich and granges in Wollishofen and Zug. In the 15th century, the Abbey lost the use of most of these distant businesses, they were limited to products produced at the Abbey and a local dairy.

Due to the involvement of Walters IV von Eschenbach in the regicide of King Albert I of Germany near Windisch in 1308, all the Eschenbach possessions were confiscated by the Habsburgs in 1309. In 1339 they were all placed under the authority of the Lords of Hallwyl. In 1344 and then in 1403 the Abbey entered into citizenship contracts with first Zug and then Zurich. Increasingly, it now fell under Zurich's authority, and after 1473 the monastic economy was under the direct supervision of the Zurich City Council. In the Old Zurich War, the Swiss Confederation plundered the monastery, whose monks had fled to Zurich. In 1493, a fire damaged the convent building. Then, in 1495 Zurich acquired, from the lords of Hallwyl, the vogtei or reeve rights over the Abbey. In 1523, the last abbot, Wolfgang Joner (Rüpplin), brought the reformer Heinrich Bullinger into the Abbey as a teacher. In the following years, the Reformation was gradually introduced. In 1527 the monastery was abolished, and its property was taken over by the city of Zurich.

== The Reformation ==
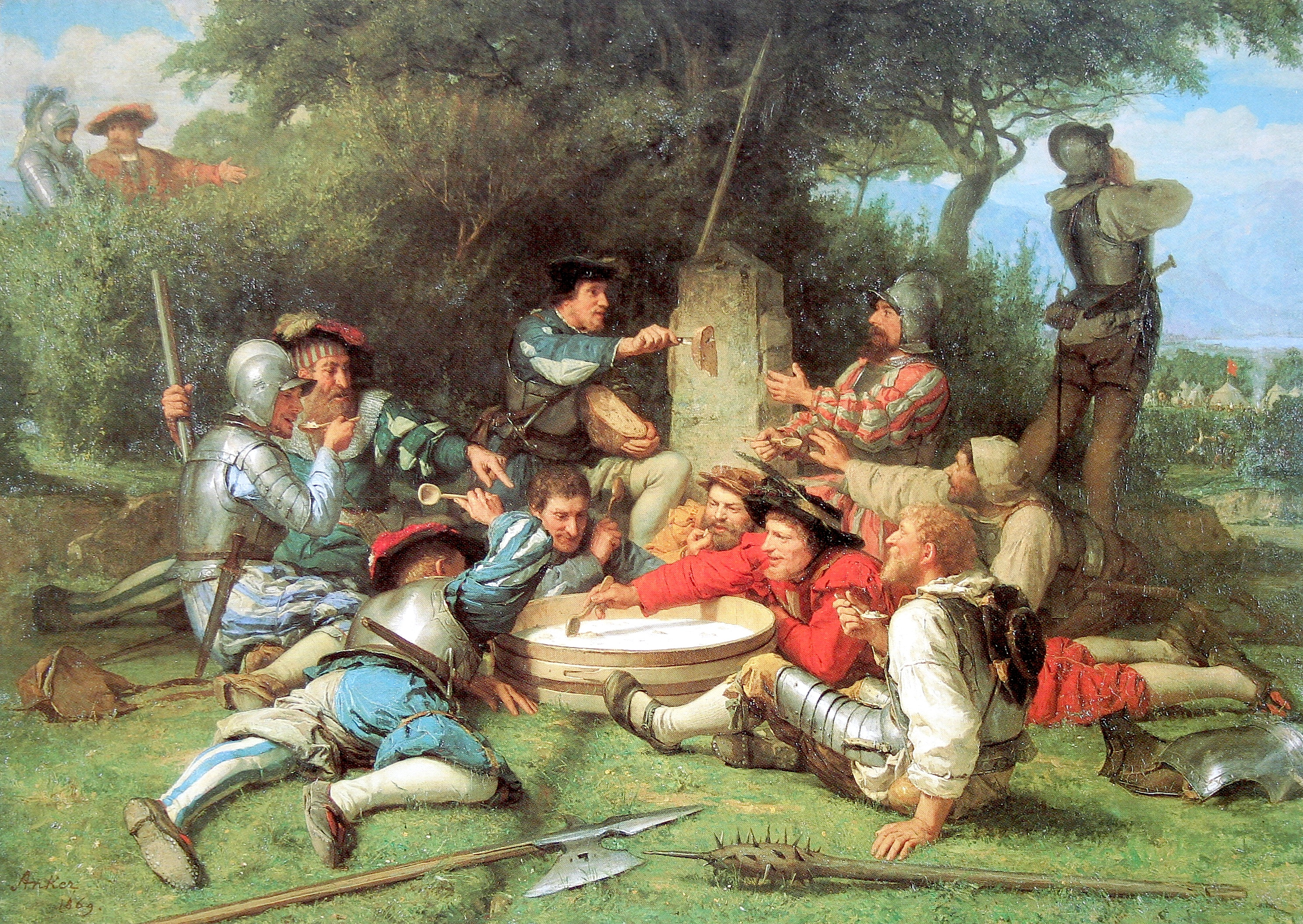
The Kappeler Milchsuppe, from an 1869 painting

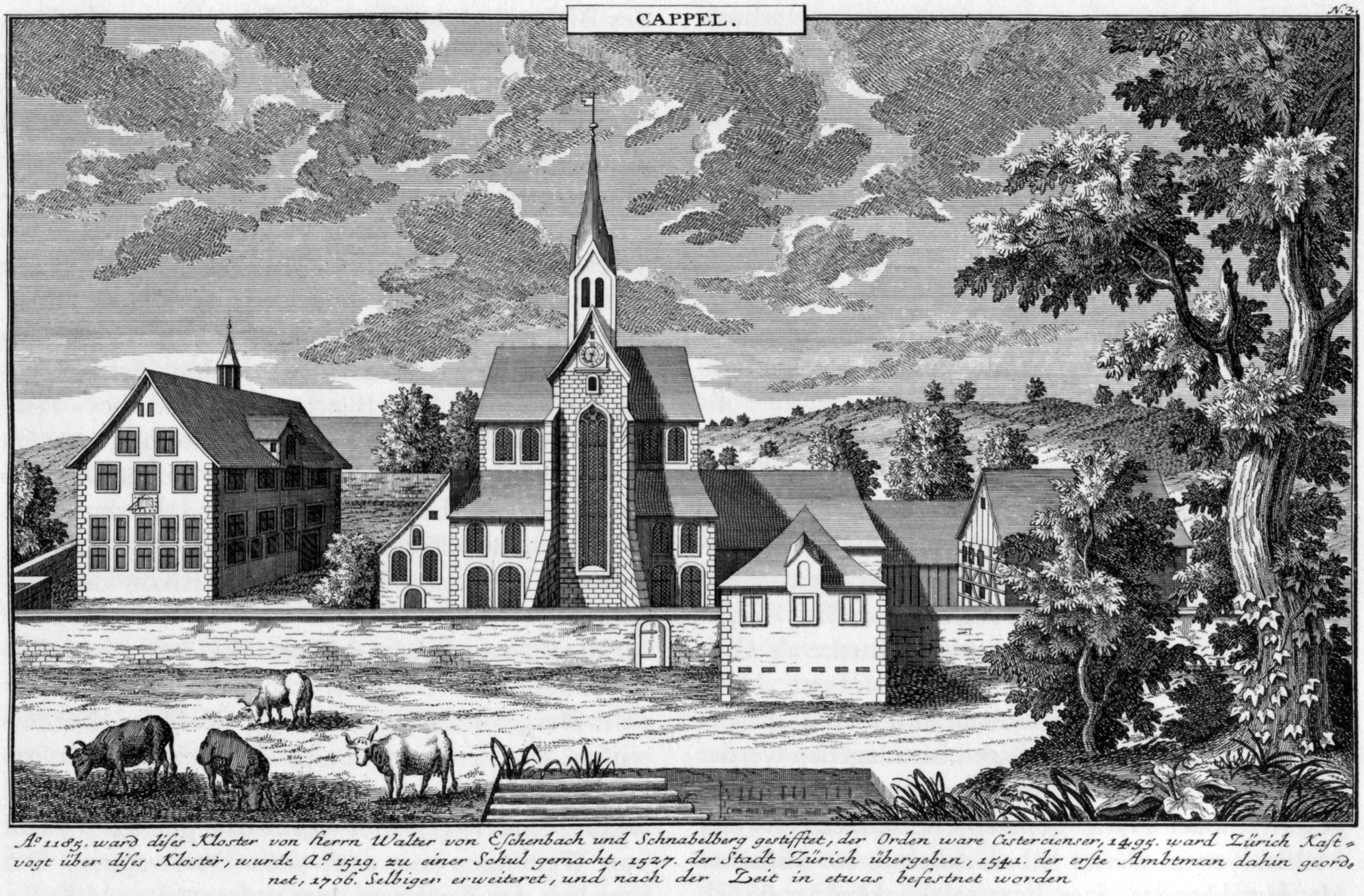
Kappel Abbey in 1741

Through Buillinger the teachings of the Reformation found their way to Kappel, and so were on 9 March 1525 the images were removed from the church. On 4 September of that same year, the Mass was abolished. A year later, on 29 March 1526, the monks celebrated Communion as Protestants and put off their cowls. Many left the monastery and turned crafts or became preachers. The Convention finally handed over the monastery in 1527 to the City of Zurich. Wolfgang Joner, Heinrich Bullinger and four other men remained in Kappel and operated the school as a boys boarding school. The present church became the parish church of Kappel. During the First War of Kappel, in June 1529, Kappel was the scene of the encounter between Protestant and Catholic troops. The encounter ended peacefully with a negotiation and the legendary Kappeler Milchsuppe. While the leaders negotiated an end to the conflict, the common soldiers began making a meal. This meal, the Kappeler Milchsuppe was a bread and milk soup cooked in a pot placed exactly on the cantonal border between Zurich and Zug. For the soup, the Catholics provided the milk, while the Protestants provided the bread. However, the Second War of Kappel didn't end as well. On 11 October 1531, the Protestant and Catholic armies met again, and the Zurich reformer Huldrych Zwingli was killed.

== The monastery today ==
Following the Reformation, the monastery became the property of the Canton of Zurich. In 1836 it was converted into a workhouse and a school for orphans for the Knonau District. A "correctional institution" was added to the facility. In 1894 it became a district hospital for the poor. However, over the following decades, it gradually became too small, old and run down to continue being used as a hospital. In the 1960s the district began looking at alternative uses for the complex. Beginning in 1983, the cantonal Reformed church used the building as a spiritual retreat. Today it houses a hotel with 79 rooms.

== See also ==
- Kappel am Albis
