= Sils im Domleschg =

- Municipality
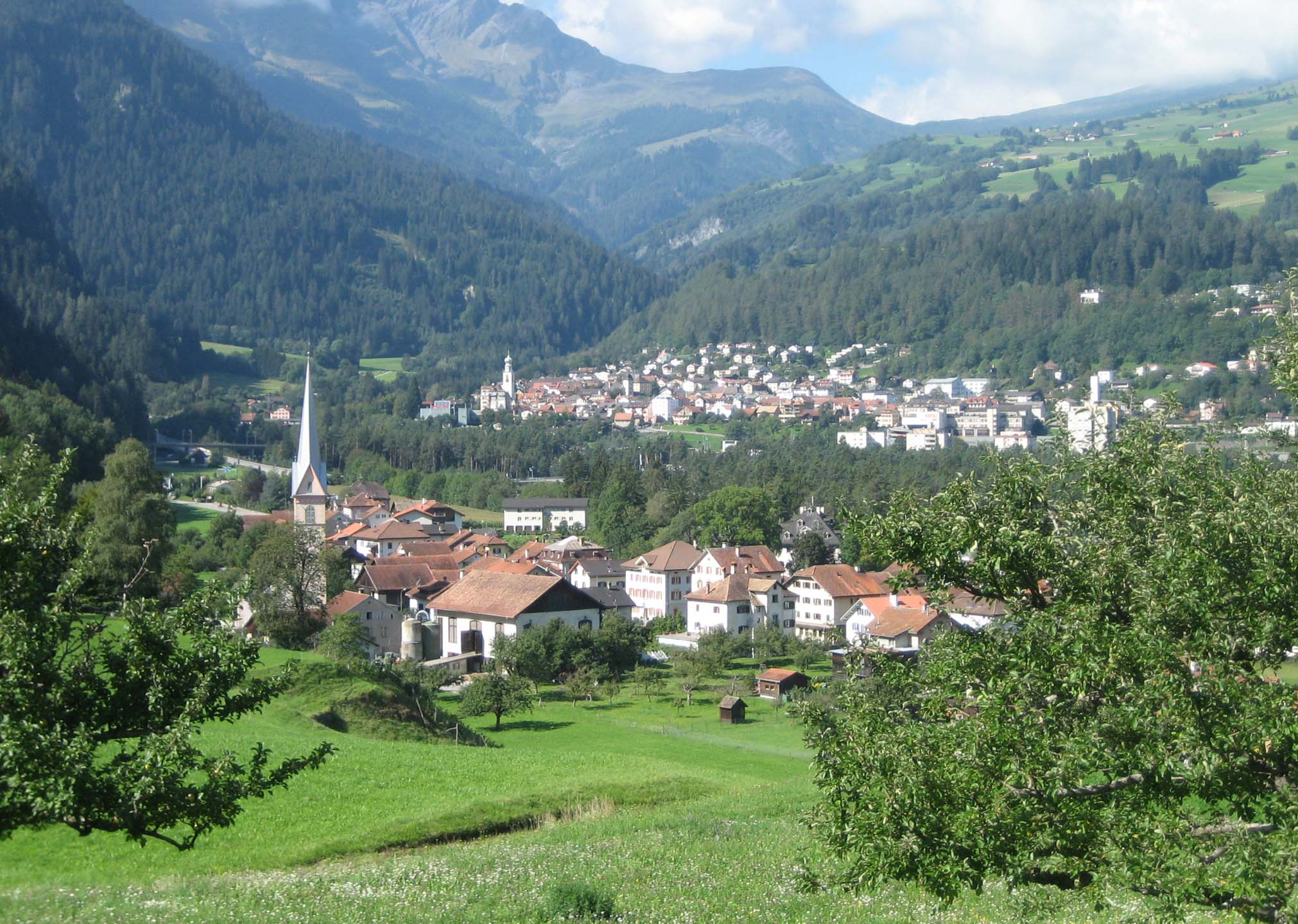
- Sils im Domleschg (foreground)

- Flag Coat of arms
- Location of Sils im Domleschg
- Location within Switzerland Location within Canton of Grisons
- Coordinates: 46°42′N 9°27′E
- Country: Switzerland
- Canton: Grisons
- District: Viamala

Government
  - Mayor: Rudolf Hans Künzler

Area
  - Total: 9.28 km^{2} (3.58 sq mi)
- Elevation: 633 m (2,077 ft)

Population (December 2015)
  - Total: 927
  - Density: 99.9/km^{2} (259/sq mi)
- Time zone: UTC+01:00 (CET)
  - Summer (DST): UTC+02:00 (CEST)
- Postal code: 7411
- SFOS number: 3640
- ISO 3166 code: CH-GR
- Surrounded by: Fürstenau, Mutten, Rongellen, Scharans, Thusis, Vaz/Obervaz, Zillis-Reischen
- Website: www.sils-id.ch

Sils im Domleschg (Romansh: Seglias) is a municipality in the Viamala Region in the Swiss canton of the Grisons.

== History ==
Sils im Domleschg is first mentioned in 1149 as de Sillas.

== Geography ==
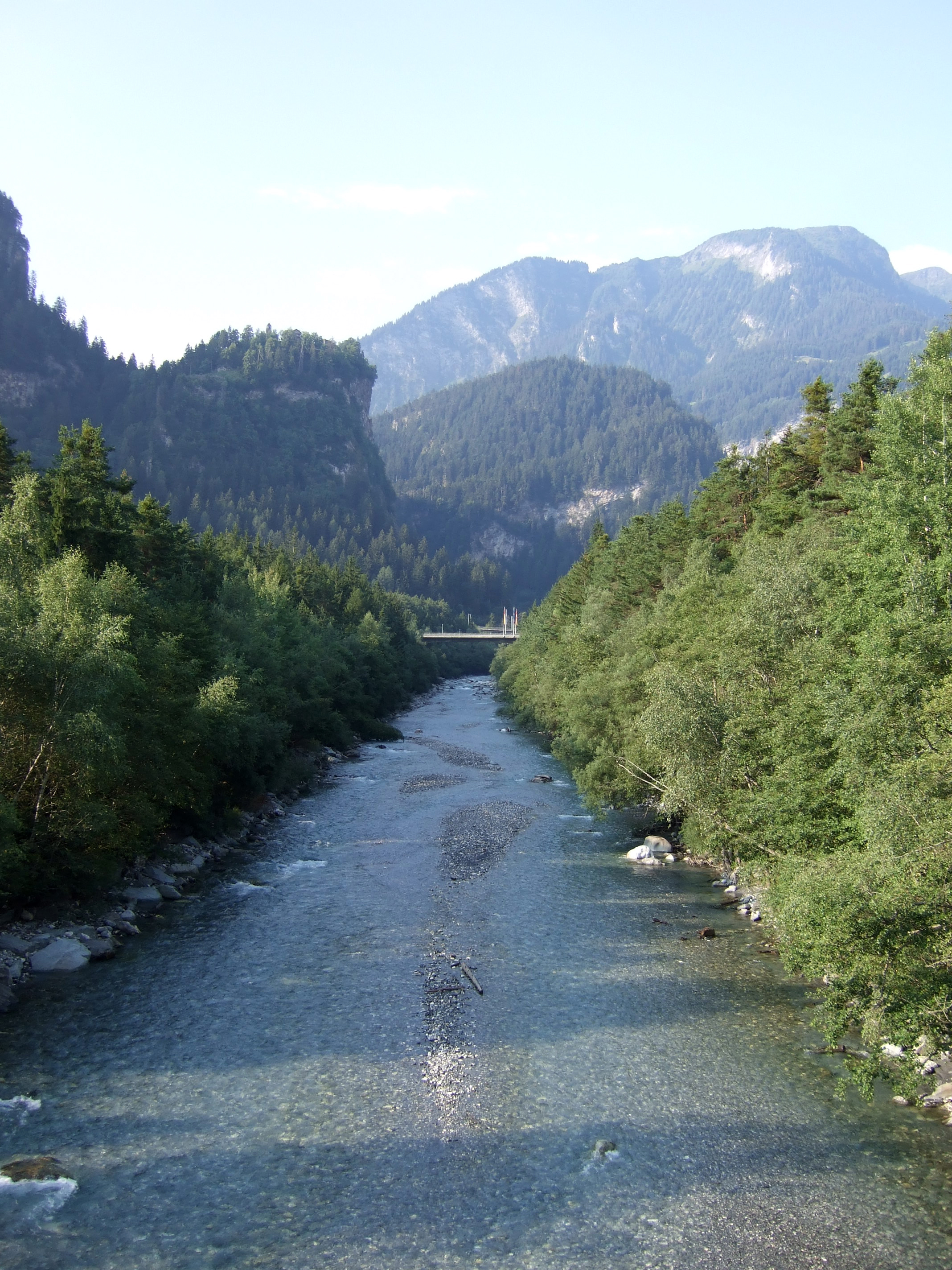
Hinterrhine river near Sils im Domleschg, with Hohen Rätien in the background

Aerial view (1947)

Sils im Domleschg has an area, (as of the 2004/09 survey) of 9.28 km^{2} (3.58 sq mi). Of this area, about 14.6% is used for agricultural purposes, while 70.4% is forested. Of the rest of the land, 8.2% is settled (buildings or roads) and 6.9% is unproductive land.

In the 2004/09 survey a total of 35 ha (86 acres) or about 3.8% of the total area was covered with buildings, an increase of 4 ha (9.9 acres) over the 1984/85 amount. Of the agricultural land, 5 ha (12 acres) is used for orchards and vineyards, 78 ha (190 acres) is fields and grasslands and 64 ha (160 acres) consists of alpine grazing areas. Since 1984/85 the amount of agricultural land has decreased by 7 ha (17 acres). Over the same time period the amount of forested land has increased by 11 ha (27 acres). Rivers and lakes cover 11 ha (27 acres) in the municipality.

Before 2017, the municipality was located in the Domleschg sub-district, of the Hinterrhein district, after 2017 it was part of the Viamala Region. It is a linear village between the Albula and Hinterrhein rivers. It consists of the village of Sils im Domleschg and the hamlets of Freihof, Campi and Albula.

== Demographics ==
Sils im Domleschg has a population (as of December 2020) of 971. As of 2014, 16.3% of the population are resident foreign nationals. In 2015 a small minority (50 or 5.4% of the population) was born in Portugal. Over the last 4 years (2010–2014) the population has changed at a rate of 5.60%. The birth rate in the municipality, in 2014, was 11.0, while the death rate was 5.5 per thousand residents.

As of 2014, children and teenagers (0–19 years old) make up 21.5% of the population, while adults (20–64 years old) are 58.1% and seniors (over 64 years old) make up 20.3%. In 2015 there were 365 single residents, 444 people who were married or in a civil partnership, 50 widows or widowers and 68 divorced residents.

In 2014 there were 387 private households in Sils im Domleschg with an average household size of 2.36 persons. Of the 214 inhabited buildings in the municipality, in 2000, about 50.0% were single family homes and 32.7% were multiple family buildings. Additionally, about 28.0% of the buildings were built before 1919, while 15.9% were built between 1991 and 2000. In 2013 the rate of construction of new housing units per 1000 residents was 7.82. The vacancy rate for the municipality, in 2015, was 2.37%.

The historical population is given in the following table:

year	population
1803	277
1850	295
1900	621
1910	541
1950	590
1960	737
1970	762
1980	826
1990	794
2000	880

== Languages ==
Most of the population (as of 2000) speaks German (86.8%), with Serbo-Croatian being second most common (3.3%) and Italian being third (2.8%).

Languages in Sils im Domleschg
Languages	Census 1980		Census 1990		Census 2000	
Languages	Number	Percent	Number	Percent	Number	Percent
German	612	74.09%	646	81.36%	764	86.82%
Romansh	56	6.78%	34	4.28%	14	1.59%
Italian	104	12.59%	60	7.56%	25	2.84%
Population	826	100%	794	100%	880	100%

== Heritage sites of national significance ==
Ehrenfels Castle, Carschenna (pre-historic petroglyphs), the ruins of Hohenrätien Castle and the ruins of Campell or Campi Castle are listed as Swiss heritage sites of national significance.

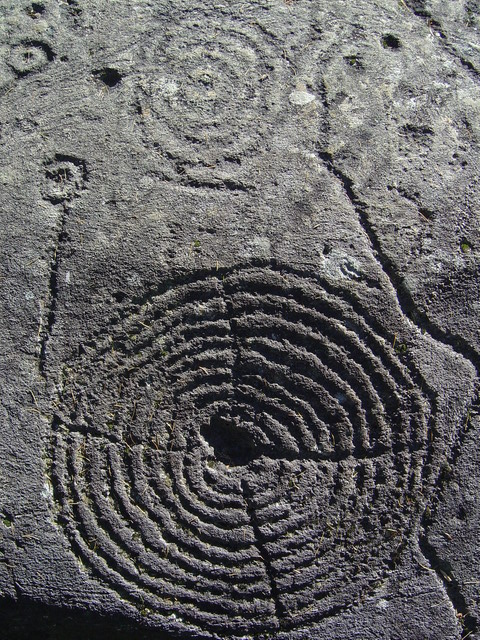
Carschenna petroglyphs

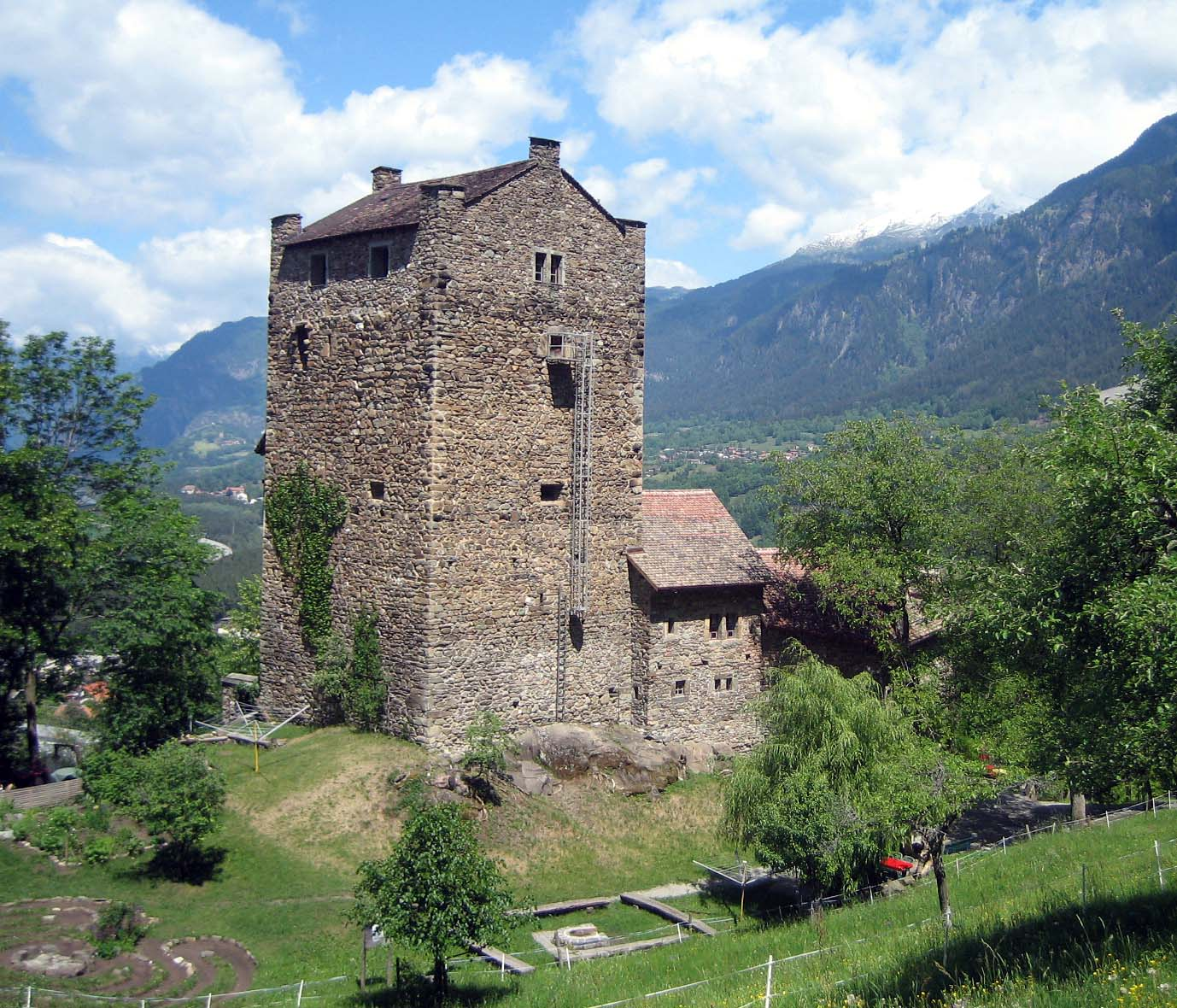
Burg Ehrenfels

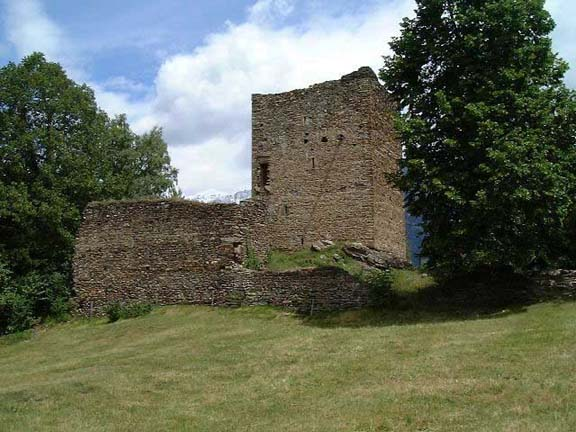
Ruins of Hohenrätien

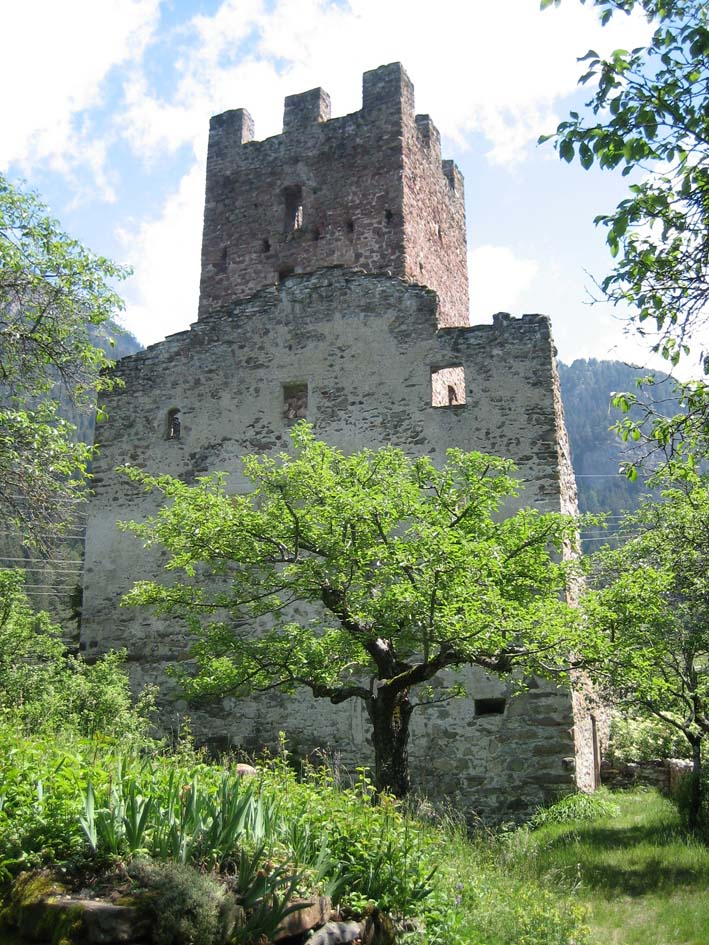
Ruine Campi (or Campell)

== Politics ==
In the 2015 federal election the most popular party was the SVP with 35.8% of the vote. The next three most popular parties were the BDP (20.1%), the SP (15.1%) and the FDP (12.7%). In the federal election, a total of 287 votes were cast, and the voter turnout was 45.9%. The 2015 election saw a large change in the voting when compared to 2011. The percentage of the vote received by the SVP increased from 27.8% in 2011 to 35.8% in 2015, while the percentage that the BDP dropped from 31.1% to 20.1%.

In the 2007 federal election the most popular party was the SVP which received 43.4% of the vote. The next three most popular parties were the SPS (27.4%), the FDP (19.7%) and the CVP (8.1%).

== Education ==
In Sils im Domleschg about 73.3% of the population (between age 25–64) have completed either non-mandatory upper secondary education or additional higher education (either university or a Fachhochschule).

== Economy ==
Sils im Domleschg is an industrial-tertiary municipality, a municipality where agriculture and manufacturing play a minor role in the economy.

As of 2014, there were a total of 287 people employed in the municipality. Of these, a total of 14 people worked in 6 businesses in the primary economic sector. The secondary sector employed 160 workers in 21 separate businesses. A minority (25.6%) of the secondary sector employees worked in very small businesses. There were 5 small businesses with a total of 119 employees. Finally, the tertiary sector provided 113 jobs in 42 businesses. In 2014 a total of 7.8% of the population received social assistance.

== Religion ==
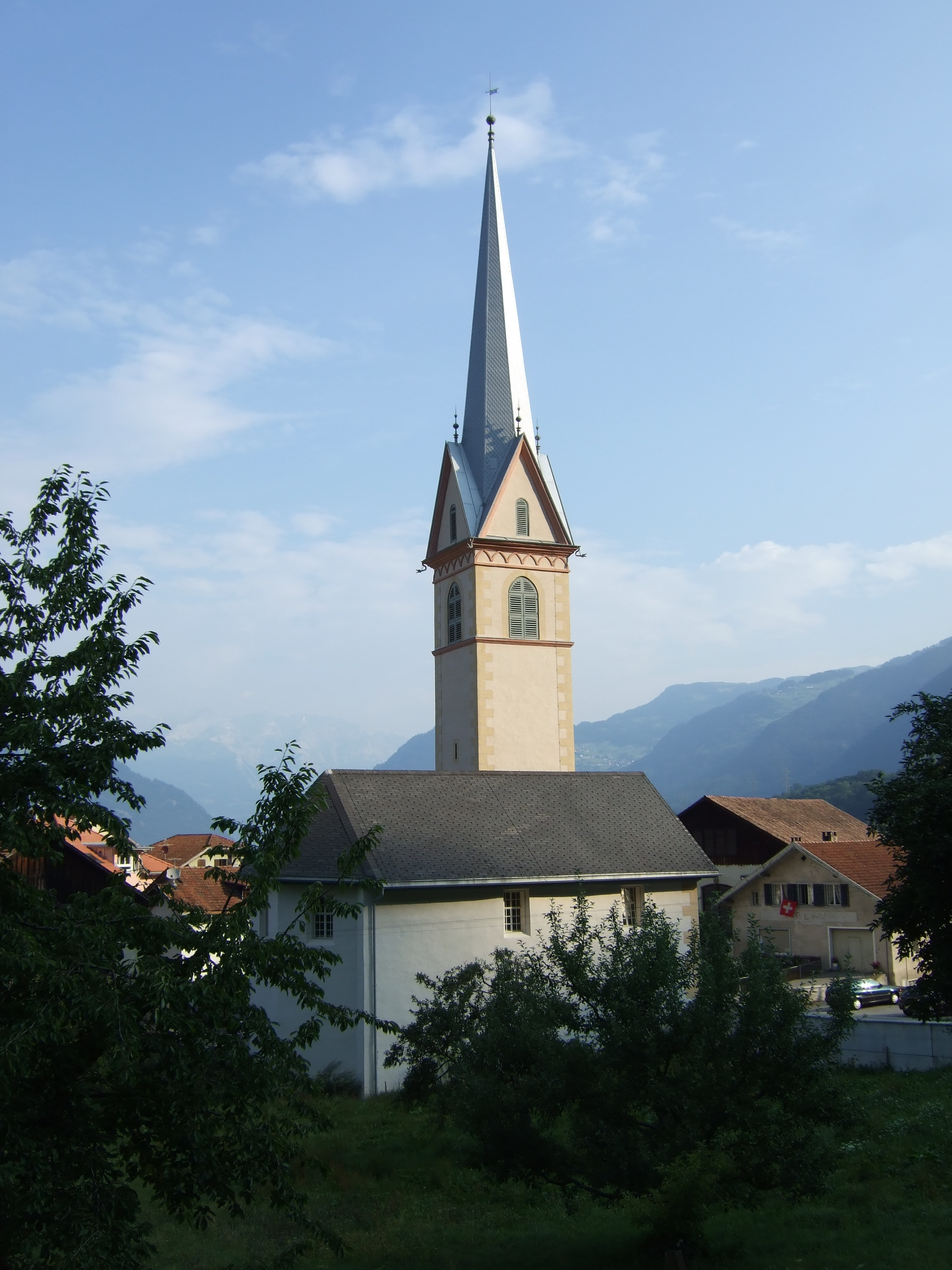
Church in Sils im Domleschg

From the 2000 census, 700 or 33.0% are Roman Catholic, while 1,176 or 55.4% belonged to the Swiss Reformed Church. Of the rest of the population, there are 43 individuals (or about 2.03% of the population) who belong to the Orthodox Church, and there are 13 individuals (or about 0.61% of the population) who belong to another Christian church. There are 21 (or about 0.99% of the population) who are Muslim. There was 1 individual (or about 0.05% of the population) who belonged to another church (not listed on the census), 97 (or about 4.57% of the population) who belong to no church, are agnostic or atheist, and 71 individuals (or about 3.35% of the population) who did not answer the question.
