= Ehrenfels Castle (Grisons) =

Castle in Switzerland

- Burg Ehrenfels
- Sils im Domleschg
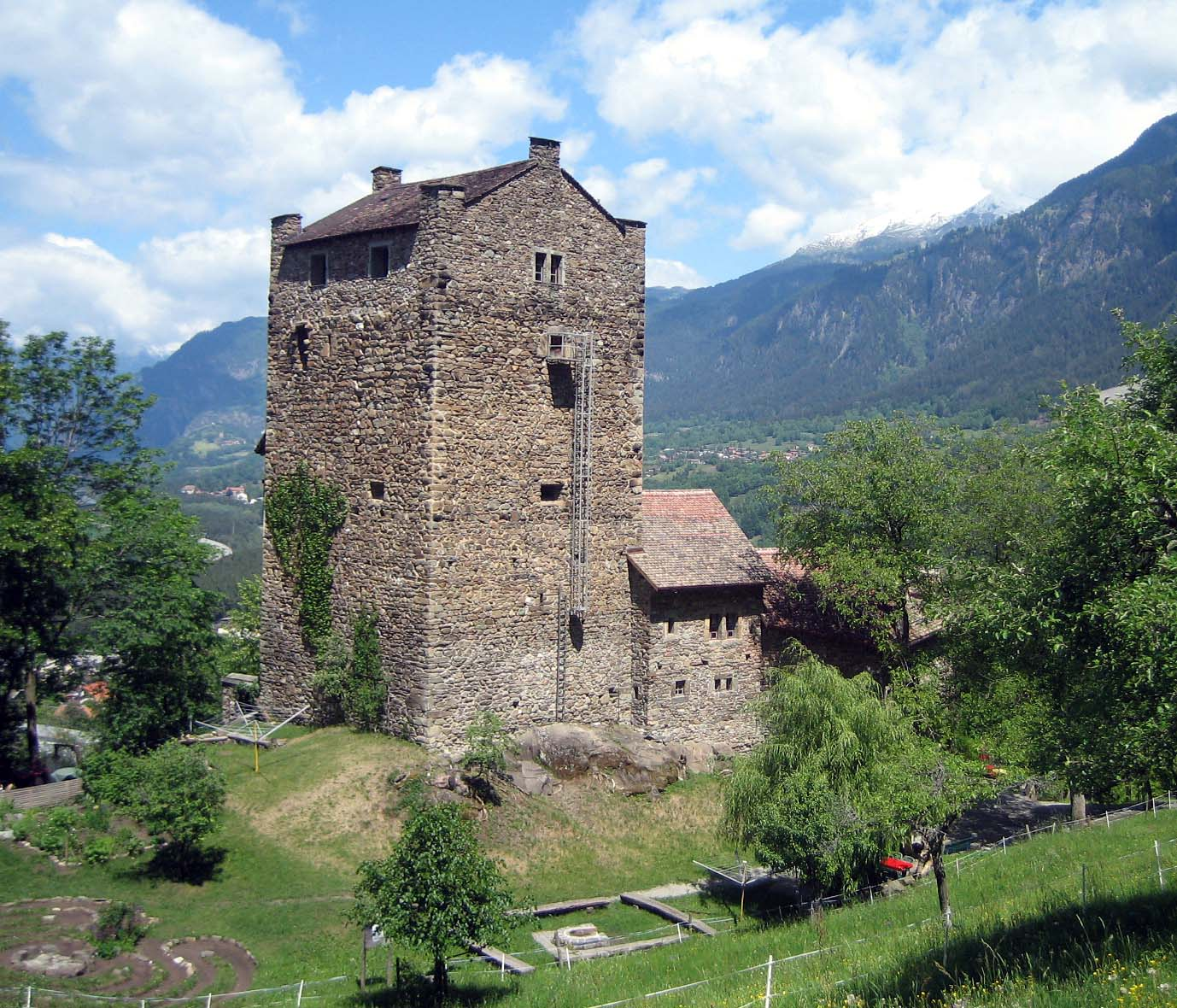
- Ehrenfels Castle from the north

Site information
- Type: hill castle
- Code: CH-GR
- Condition: preserved

Location
- Coordinates: 46°41′48″N 09°27′06″E
- Height: 761 m above the sea

Site history
- Built: early 13th century

Ehrenfels Castle is a castle in the municipality of Sils im Domleschg of the Canton of Graubünden in Switzerland. It is a Swiss heritage site of national significance. Today it is a youth hostel.

== History ==
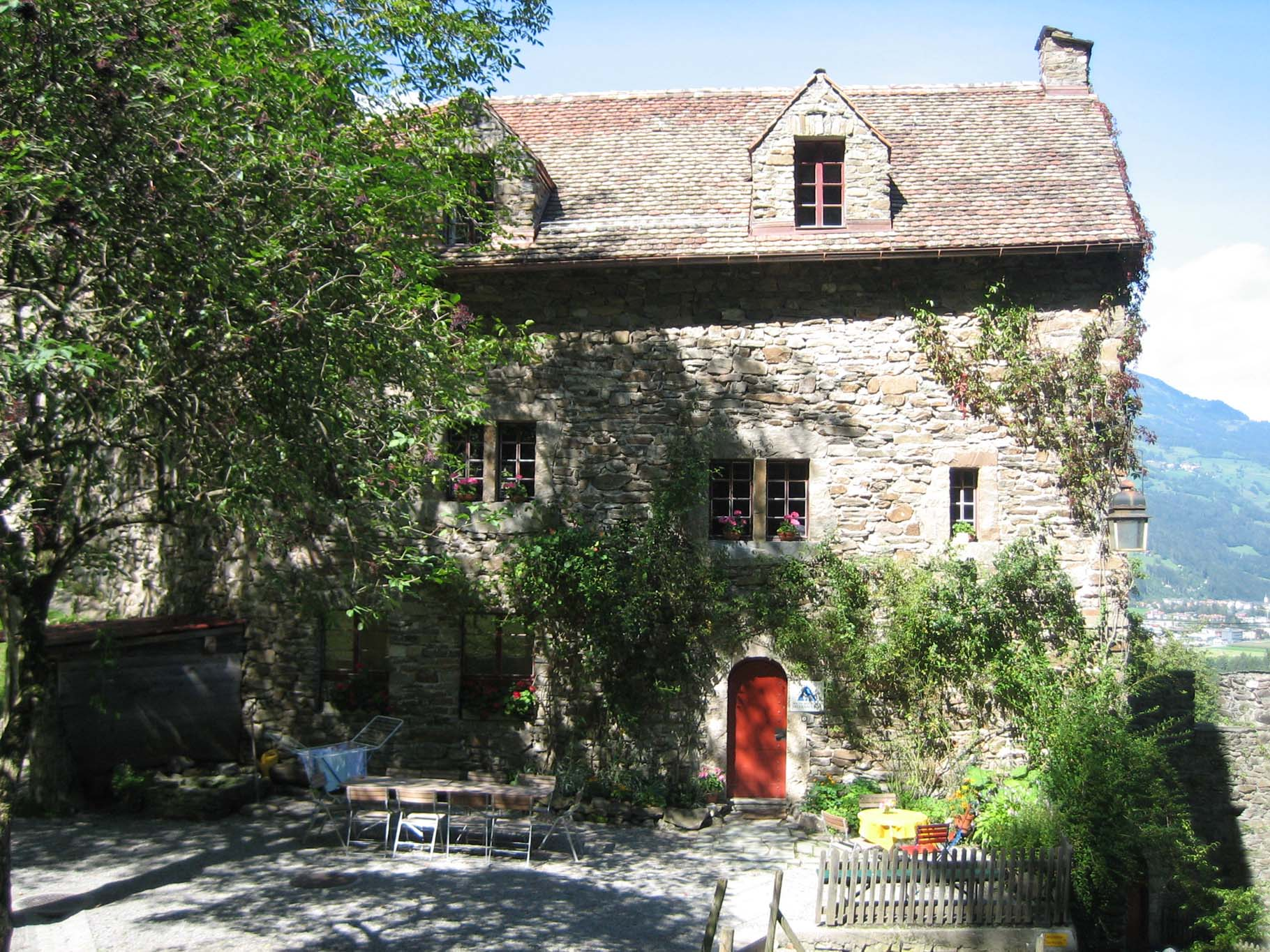
Front door of the hostel

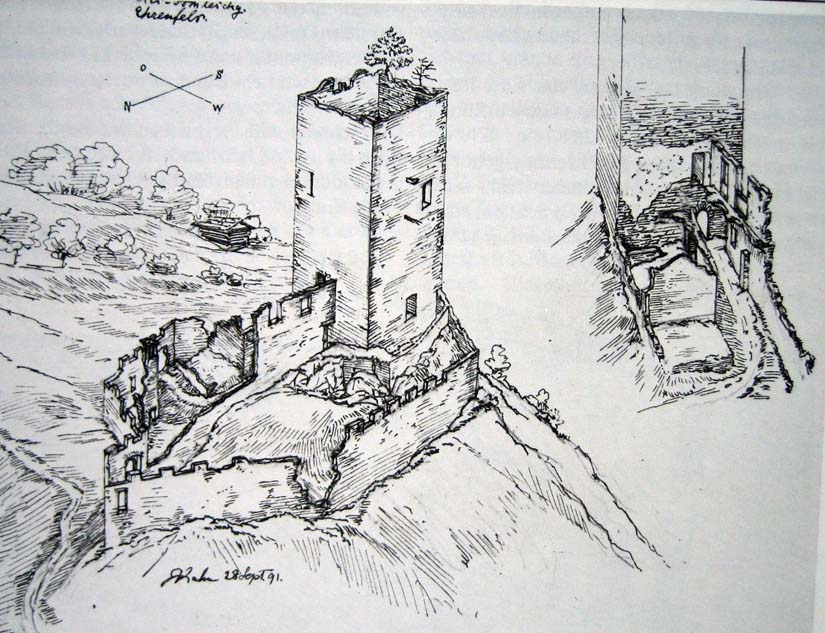
Ehrenfels in 1891

The castle was probably built in the first half of the 13th century. The first mention of the Lord of Ehrenfels is in 1257. In 1320 it was owned by Burkhard and Rudolf von Schauenstein, who also used the name Ehrenfels or Herrenfels. They probably expanded the simple bergfried with residential space and a ring wall around that time. The castle was first mentioned in 1423 with Hermann von Ehrenfels as the owner. Toward the end of the 15th century or in the early 16th century it was given to Cazis Monastery, but the Schauenstein-Ehrenfels family continued to occupy it. During the 16th century the castle was renovated and rebuilt into a more comfortable palas.

However, by 1600 Ehrenfels was abandoned and began falling into ruin. Parts of the castle were demolished for building material, and when the Ehrenfels-Schauenstein male line died out in 1742, only a ruin remained. In 1933 it was acquired by the Schweizerische Burgenverein (Swiss Castle Association) and converted into a youth hostel. Since the conversion was done without archeological investigation or records, much of the history of the castle was lost. In 1954 Swiss Youth Hostels bought the castle from the Association. It remains in operation today with 38 beds.

== See also ==
- List of castles in Switzerland
