= St. Luzi, Chur =

Church and former abbey in Chur, Switzerland

Coordinates: 46.8477°N 9.5371°E

- Sankt Luzi
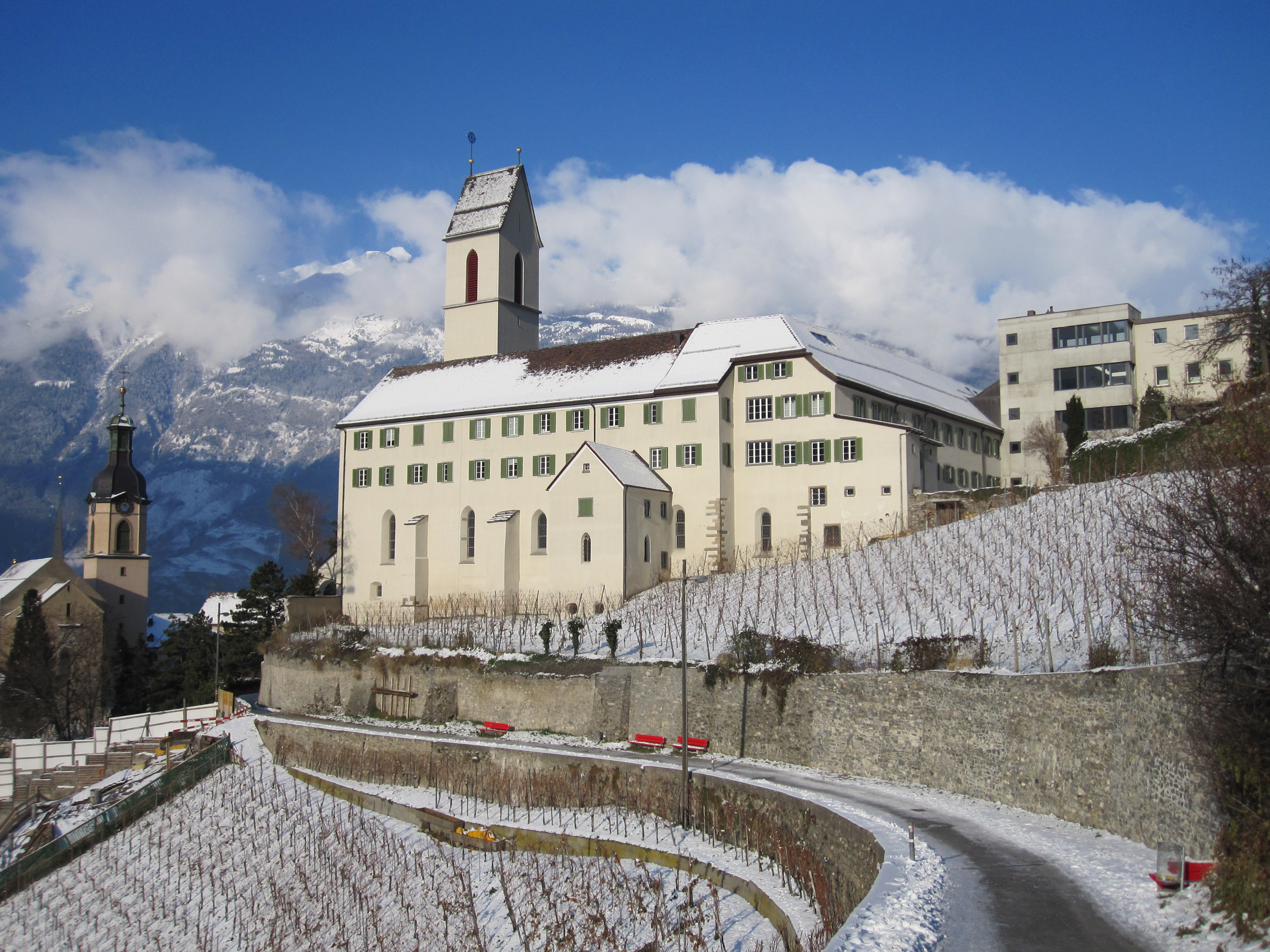

Religion
- Affiliation: Catholic Church
- Rite: Latin
- Ecclesiastical or organizational status: Seminary church

Location
- Location: Chur, Grisons, Switzerland
- Interactive map of St. Luzi, Chur

Architecture
- Completed: late 4th century

St. Luzi (German: Sankt Luzi), also known as Monastery of Saint Lucius or Monastic Church of St. Lucius, is a church and former Premonstratensian abbey in Chur, in the canton of Grisons, Switzerland.

The early history of the church is poorly documented. The relics of its eponymous saint were stolen before 821. Around 800, the church appears to have housed a community of regulars who ran a school for clerics, and it may also have been home to the school of scribes of Carolingian Rhaetia.

== History ==
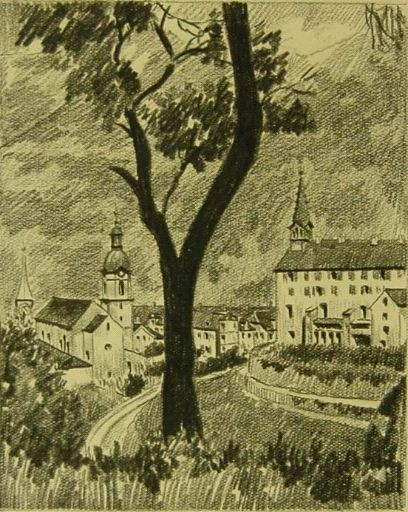
Chur, with St. Luzius Church on the right (charcoal on paper); before 1937, as indicated by the old choir tower

The Premonstratensians are firmly attested at St. Luzi in 1149, probably shortly after their arrival. The house was a daughter of Roggenburg in Bavaria and belonged to the Swabian province of the order. It was headed first by a prior, then by a provost from 1156, and by an abbot from 1186/1191, though the general chapter only formally raised it to the rank of abbey in 1453.

The Reformation brought drastic changes. Abbot Theodul Schlegel was executed in 1529, and the abbey passed under the tutelage of the League of God's House. In 1539, its property was granted as a hereditary fief to burghers of Chur, and the monks went into exile at Bendern, where their numbers fell sharply. Thanks to the energetic efforts of the Habsburgs, they were able to return to St. Luzi in 1636.

The abbey was suppressed in 1806. A congregation of Redemptorists from Babenhausen in Bavaria occupied the premises in 1807, but were expelled the same year. The building then took in the major seminary that had been driven out of Merano.

== Property and dependencies ==
The abbey's property was concentrated in Chur, where it held houses, building plots, meadows, and vineyards. It also extended into the nearby Rhine valley, the Schanfigg, and the Churwalden valley, with more distant holdings at Bendern and Rankweil.

In Chur, the women's convent of St. Hilarius (mentioned between 1209 and 1347) was attached to the abbey. Nearby, the abbey also owned the chapel of St. Anthony, with its associated leper-house, as well as St. Martin's hospital, which the bishop had handed over in 1154. The town took back these two charitable institutions at the end of the 14th century.

The same donation of 1154 included the church of the former women's convent of Mistail. The abbey exchanged this convent and most of its property in 1282 for the bishop's private church at Sagogn. In 1156, the bishop also entrusted a monk of St. Luzi with the direction of the chapter of canonesses of Cazis, with the title of prior. The lords of Belmont were the abbey's principal benefactors and had themselves buried there.

== Buildings ==
The church goes back to a memoria (funerary chapel) of Saint Andrew from the late 4th century. The Carolingian building, a hall with triple apse, was probably built in the first half of the 8th century, but only the circular crypt survives, where Saint Lucius was venerated. The adjoining vault, known as that of Saint Emerita, appears to be of more recent origin. Grave goods confirm the function of burial church of the Victorids, traditionally attributed to St. Luzi.

The Romanesque sanctuary received the relics of Saint Lucius in 1252 and was reconsecrated in 1295, dedicated to Saints Andrew, Lucius, Emerita, and all the saints. The church and conventual buildings were altered at the end of the Gothic period. Their present appearance dates from 1811, when the building was raised in height.

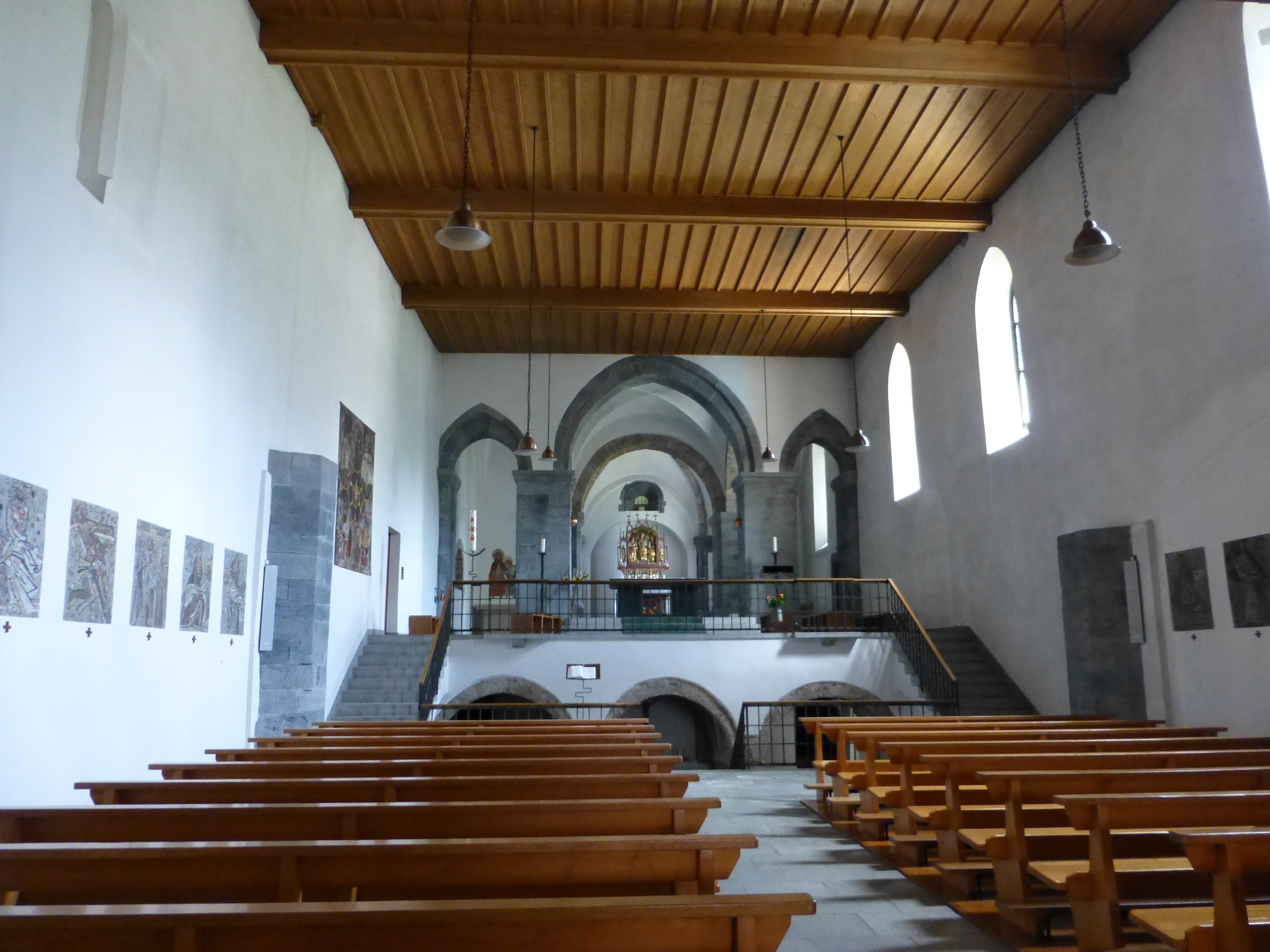
Interior: High choir

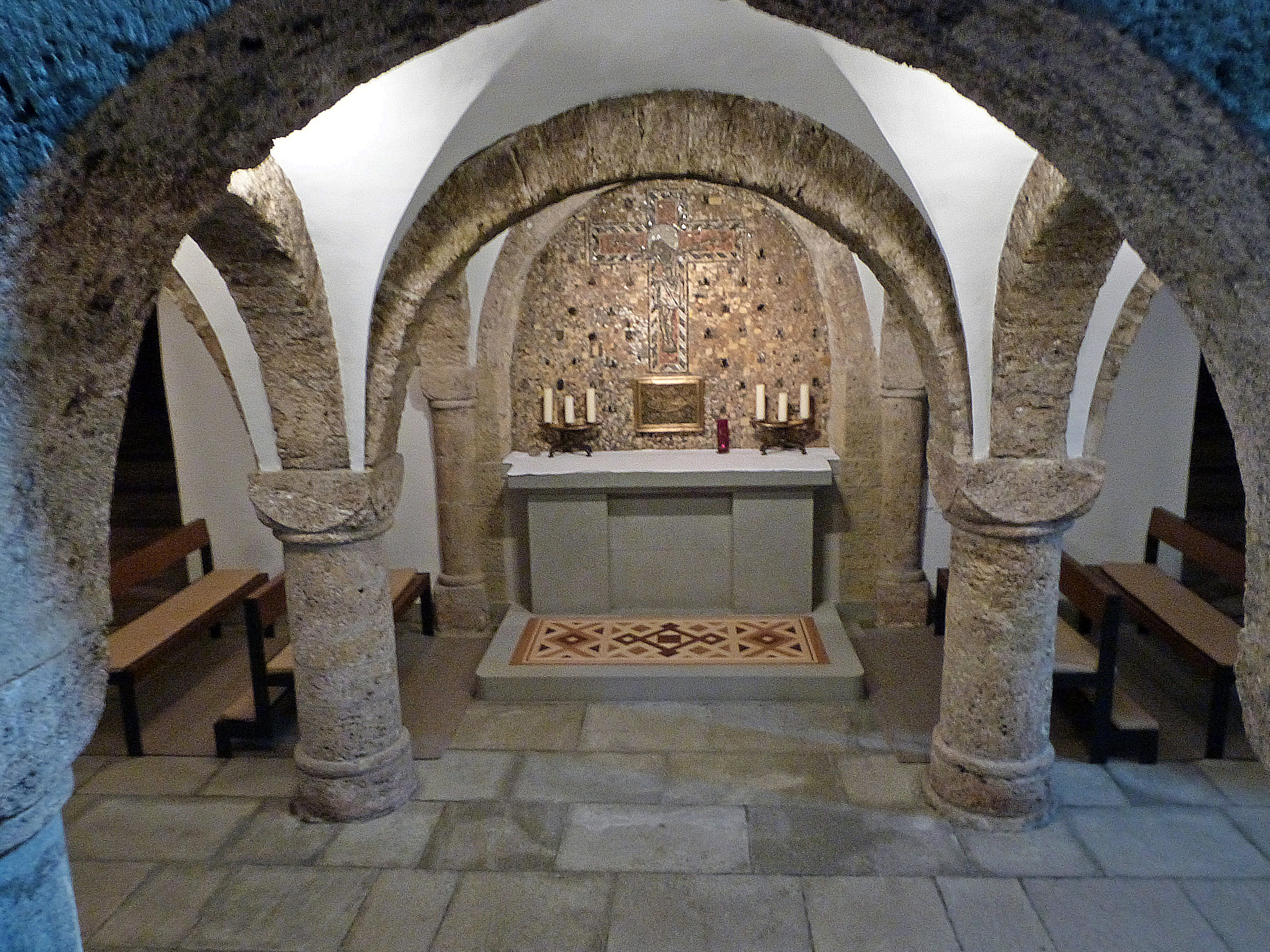
Hall of the crypt

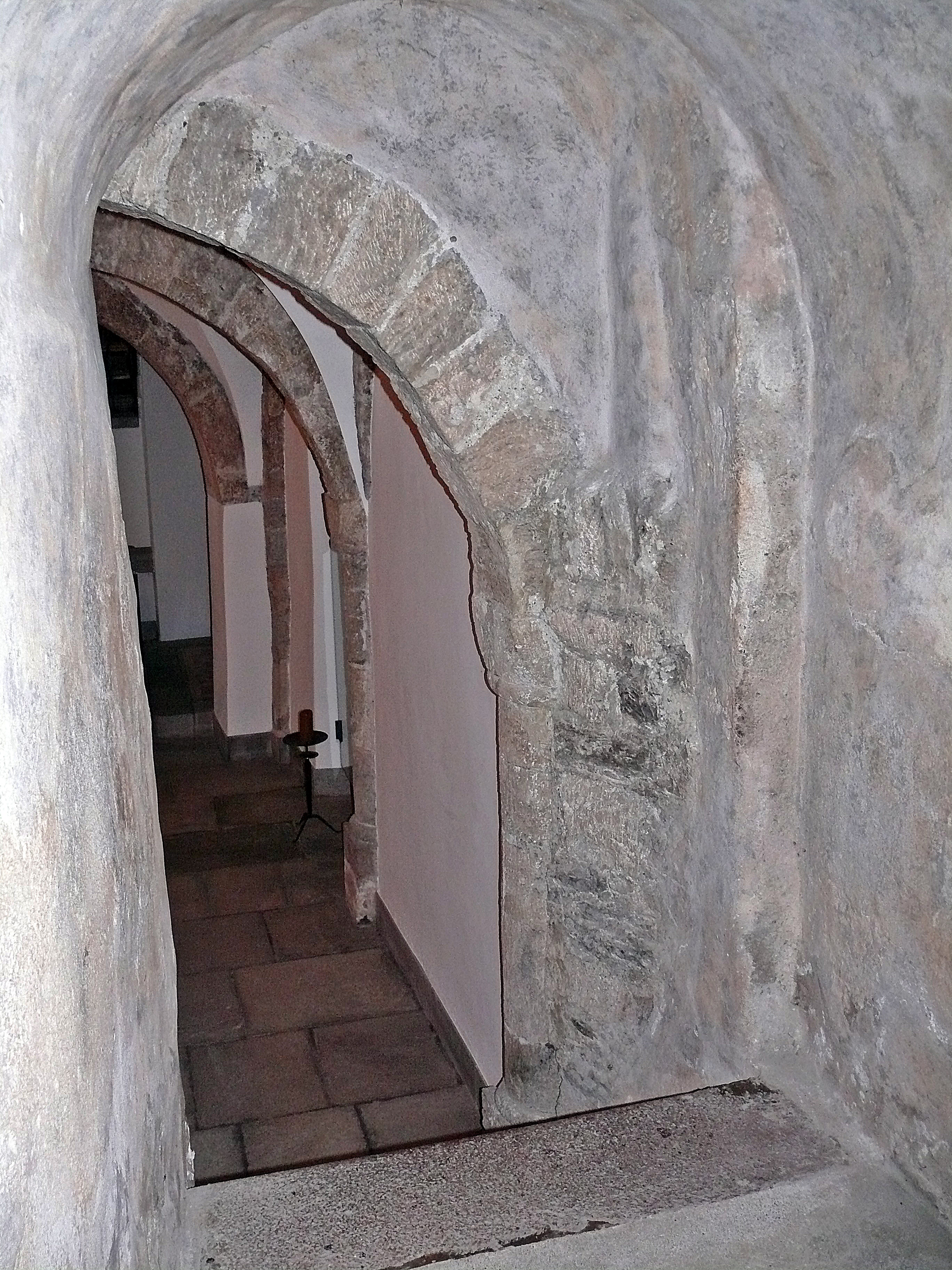
Circular crypt

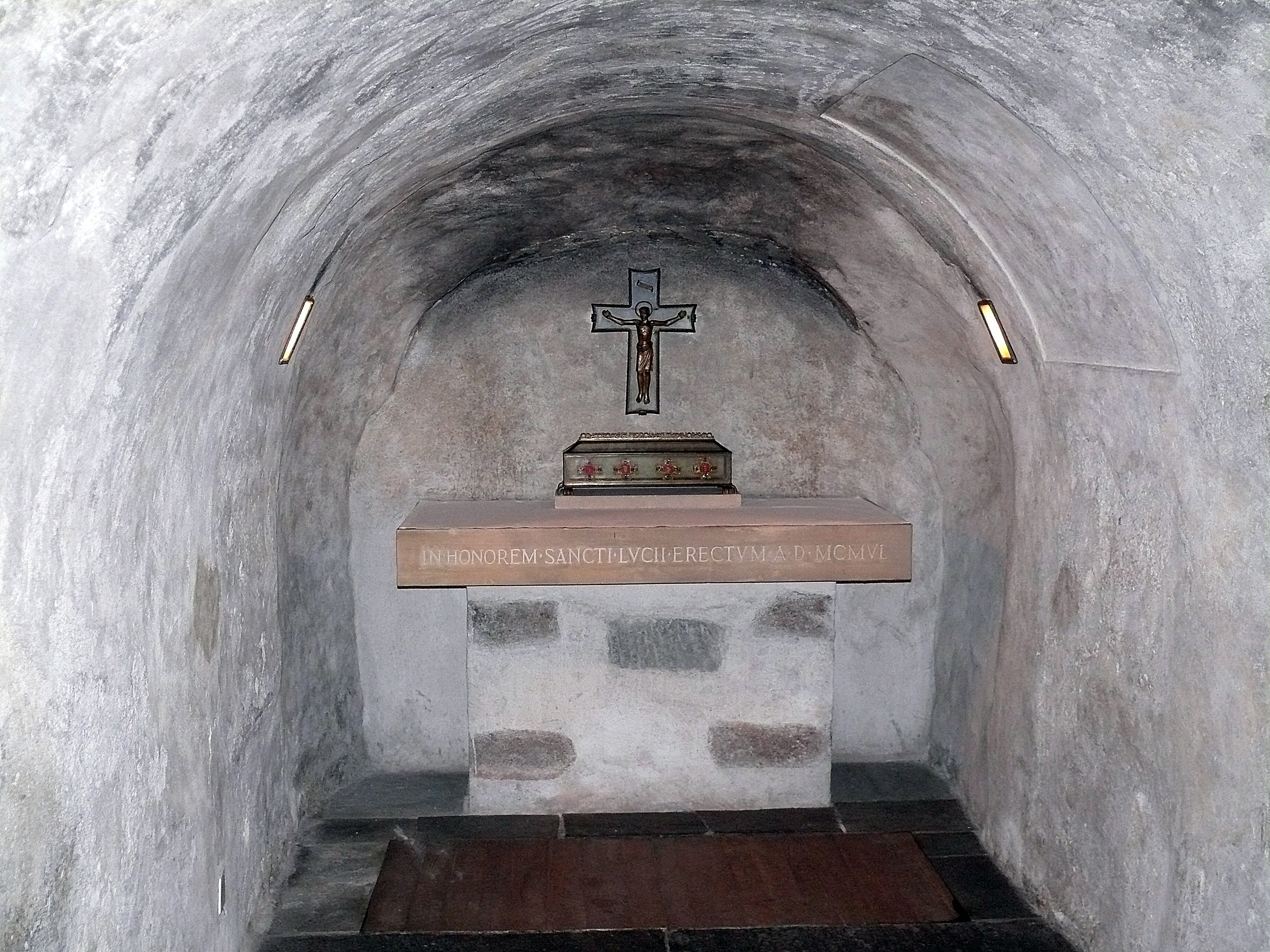
Holy Sepulchre

== Bibliography ==
- Die Kunstdenkmäler des Kantons Graubünden, vol. 7, 1948 (2nd ed. 1975), pp. 257–271.
- N. Backmund, Monasticon Praemonstratense, I/1, 1949, pp. 52–55 (2nd ed. 1983).
- F. Oswald et al., Vorromanische Kirchenbauten, 1, 1966–1971, pp. 51–52.
