= Sur Carungas =

Mountain in Switzerland

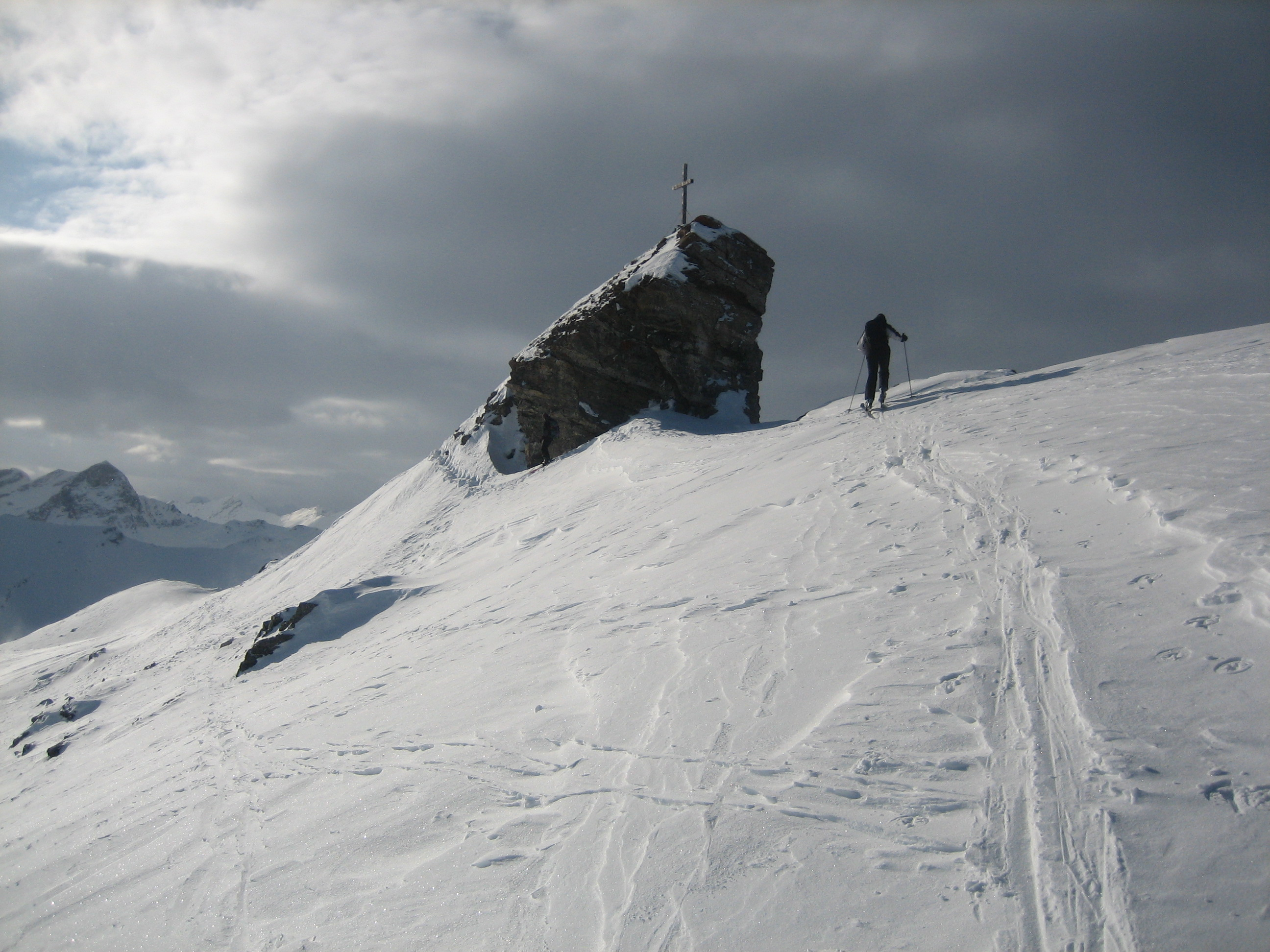
- Sur Carungas from North

Highest point
- Elevation: 2,829 m (9,281 ft)
- Prominence: 126 m (413 ft)
- Parent peak: Piz digl Gurschus
- Coordinates: 46°33′51″N 9°30′6″E

Geography
- Location within Switzerland
- Location: Graubünden, Switzerland
- Parent range: Oberhalbstein Alps

Climbing
- Easiest route: From Piz Cartas

Sur Carungas is a mountain of the Oberhalbstein Alps, located between Ausserferrera and Savognin in the Swiss canton of Graubünden. It lies on the range separating the valleys of Ferrera (west) and Sursés (east), south of Piz Curvér.
