= Cagliatscha Castle =

Ruined castle in Graubünden, Switzerland

- Burg Cagliatscha
- Clugin village, Andeer
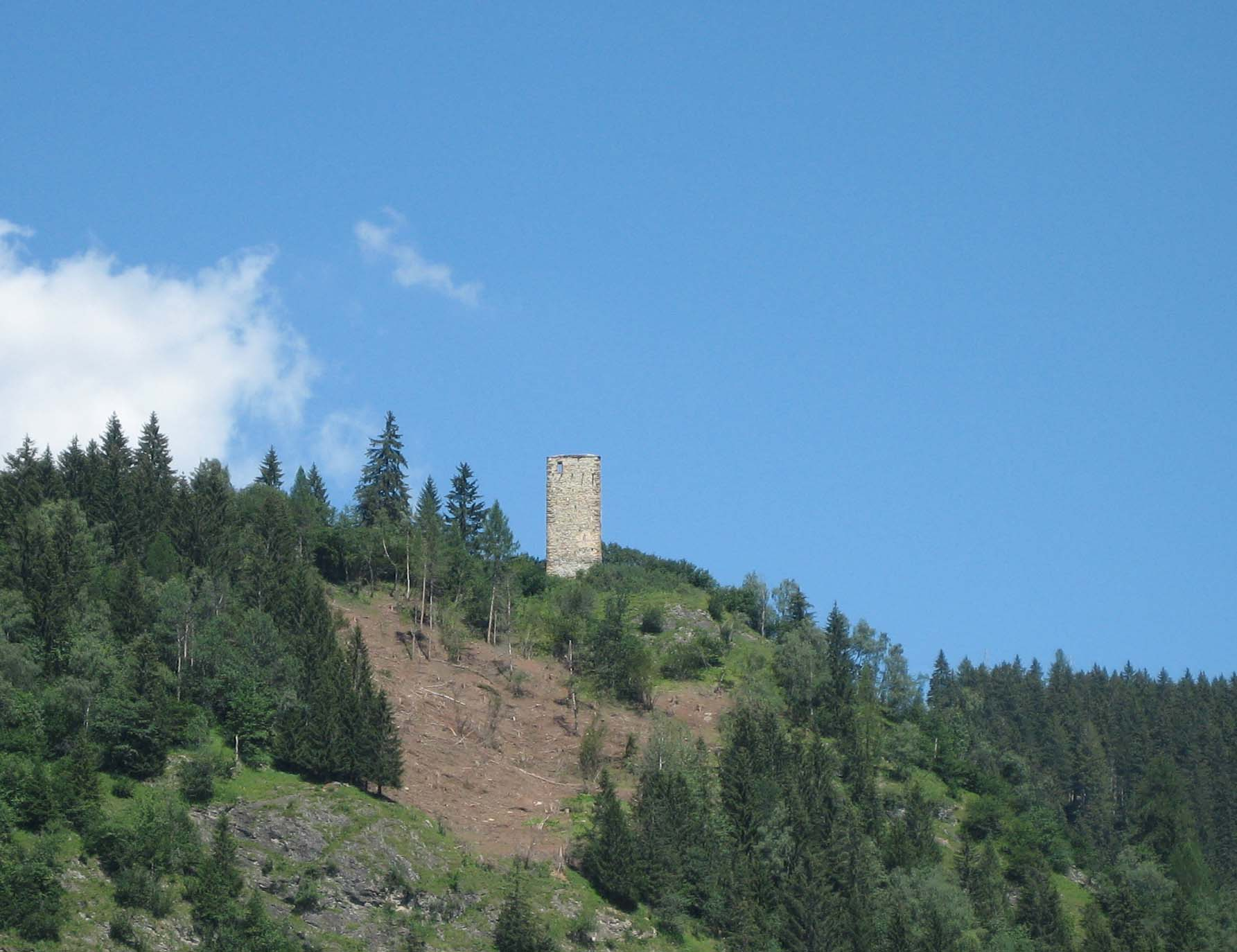
- Ruins of Cagliatscha Castle

Site information
- Type: hill castle
- Code: CH-GR
- Condition: ruin

Location
- Coordinates: 46°36′50″N 9°25′20″E
- Height: 1,182 m above the sea

Site history
- Built: around 1265
- Materials: stone

Garrison information
- Occupants: ministeriales

Cagliatscha Castle German: Burg Cagliatscha is a ruined castle in the municipality of Andeer in the Viamala Region of the canton of Graubünden in Switzerland.

== History ==
The region around Cagliatscha was originally granted to the Bishop of Chur, who later gave it to the Freiherr von Vaz as a fief. The Vaz family built a number of small castles throughout their lands, including Cagliatscha. It was probably finished around 1266 as several of the wooden beams have been dated to that year. There are no surviving records of the castle and even its original name is unknown. In the 16th century the chronicler Campbell called the ruins Castellatsch which is Romansh for bad castle, which evolved into Cagliatscha. It was probably the home of the ministeriales Panigad or Stainbrugg family and their coat of arms is carved into the wall. It may have been built to protect the trade road that ran through the valley.

After the extinction of the Vaz line in 1338, their lands and castles were inherited by the Counts of Werdenberg-Sargans. In 1424 the inhabitants of the valley joined the Grey League. In 1451 the Count led an army into the valley in an attempt to force them to leave the League and come back under his authority. The Count was unsuccessful in his attempt to bring the Hinterrhein valley back under his control and had to sell the land to the Bishop of Chur. By 1458 the valley bought their freedom from the Bishop.

During his campaign in the area, a number of castles were destroyed. It is likely that Cagliatscha was one of these. A fire weakened the foundations of much of the castle leading to the collapse of three out of four walls. The castle was never rebuilt. In 1984/85 it was cataloged and renovated by volunteers from the Burgenvereins Graubünden.

== Castle site ==
The castle is located on a rocky spur between Andeer and Clugin about 200 m (660 ft) above the Hinterrhein valley. The tower had a footprint of 8.6 m × 8.6 m (28 ft × 28 ft). The walls were 2.24 m (7.3 ft) thick on the entrance side and 1.8 m (5.9 ft) thick on the other three sides. Today only the southern wall remains. It is about 20 m (66 ft) and five stories high. The walls are made of large, uneven stones with square corner stones. The original entrance was located on the south side on the second story. Later, a third story was added with a new entrance on the third story of the west wall. The third story was built with larger, more square stones. The largest of which was over 700 kg (1,500 lb). The fourth and fifth stories had wooden hoardings added around the tower. The pyramidal roof was covered with slate.

== Gallery ==
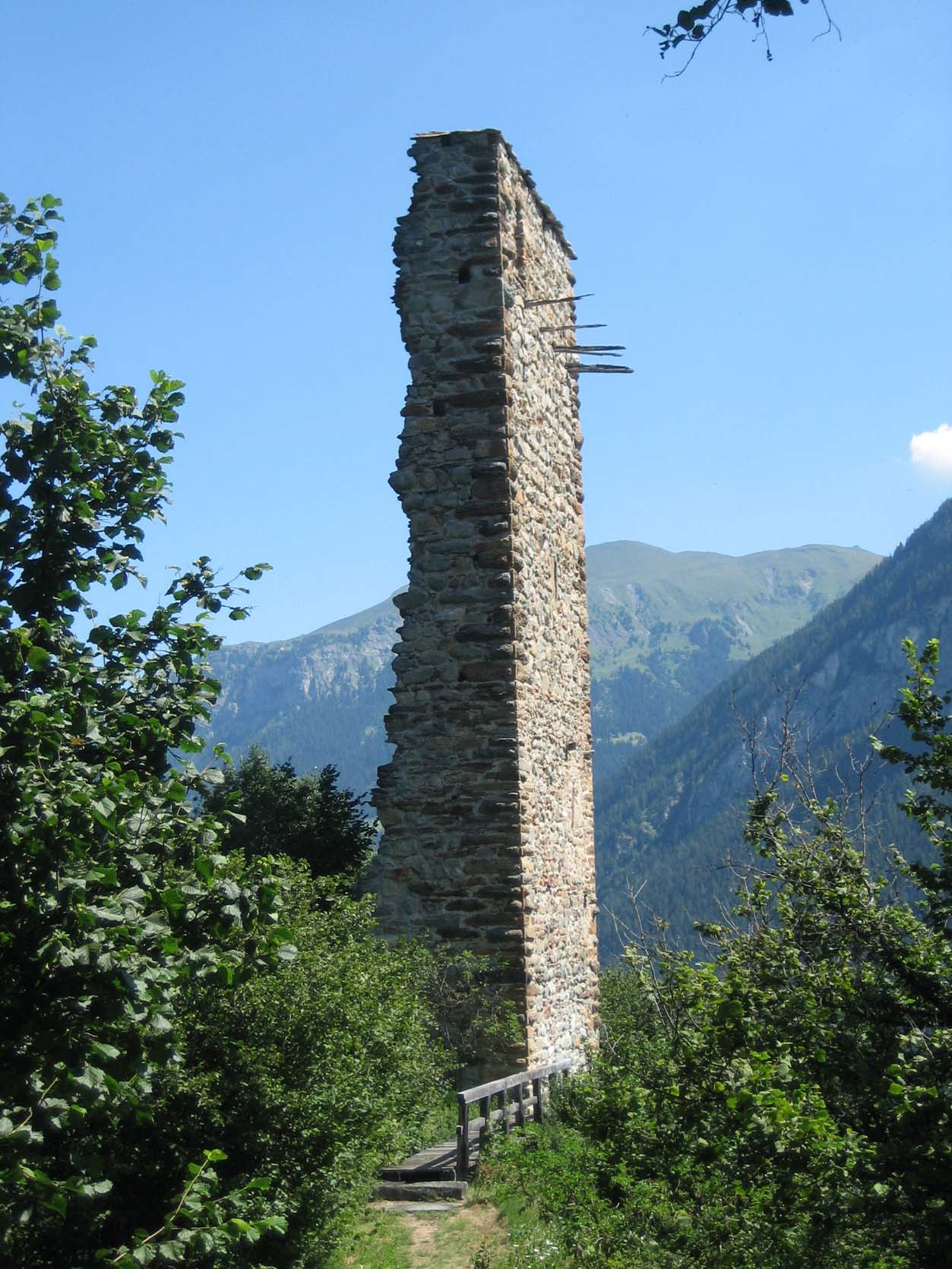
The castle

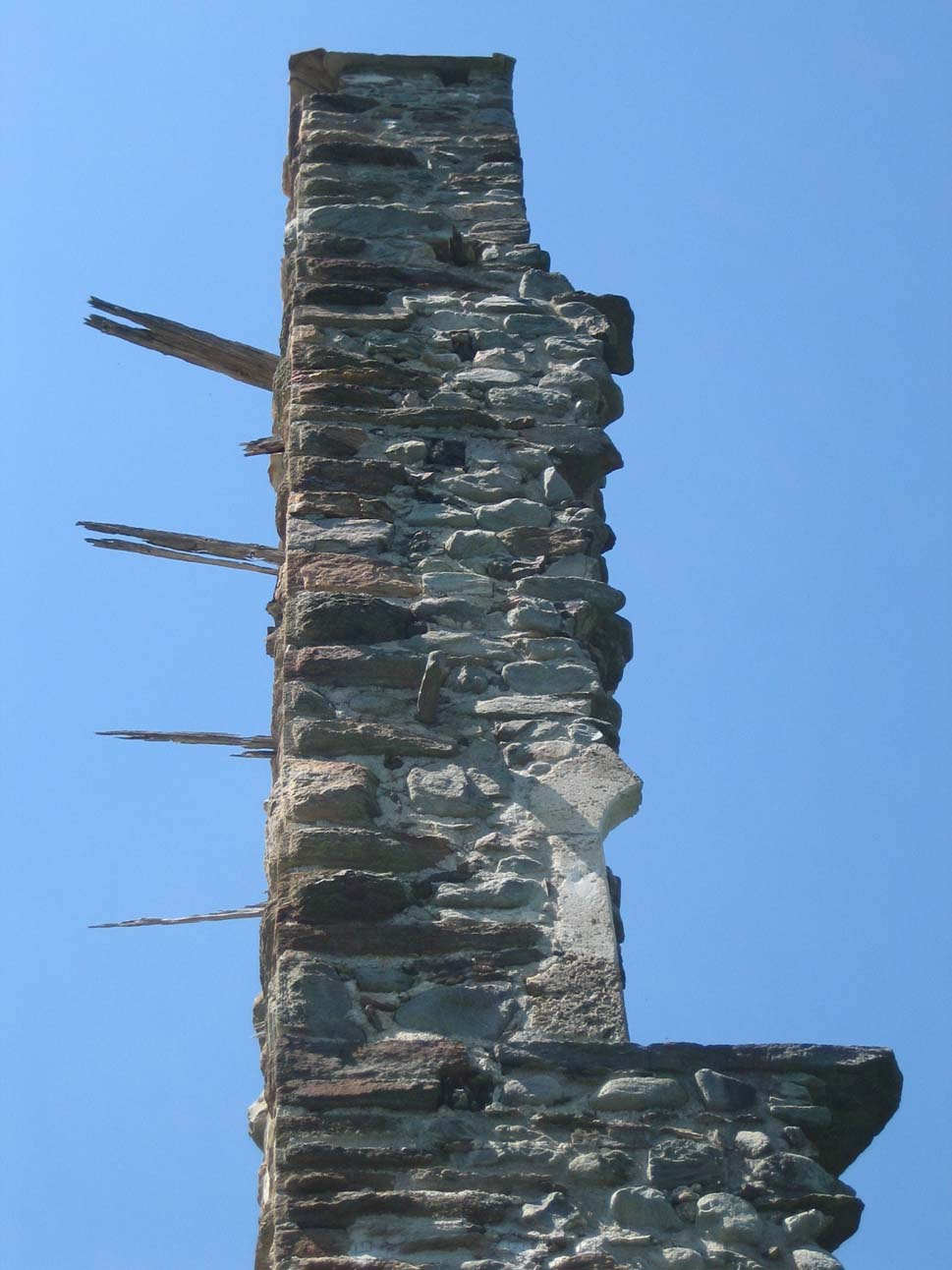
Upper wall showing the wooden beams that supported the hoardings

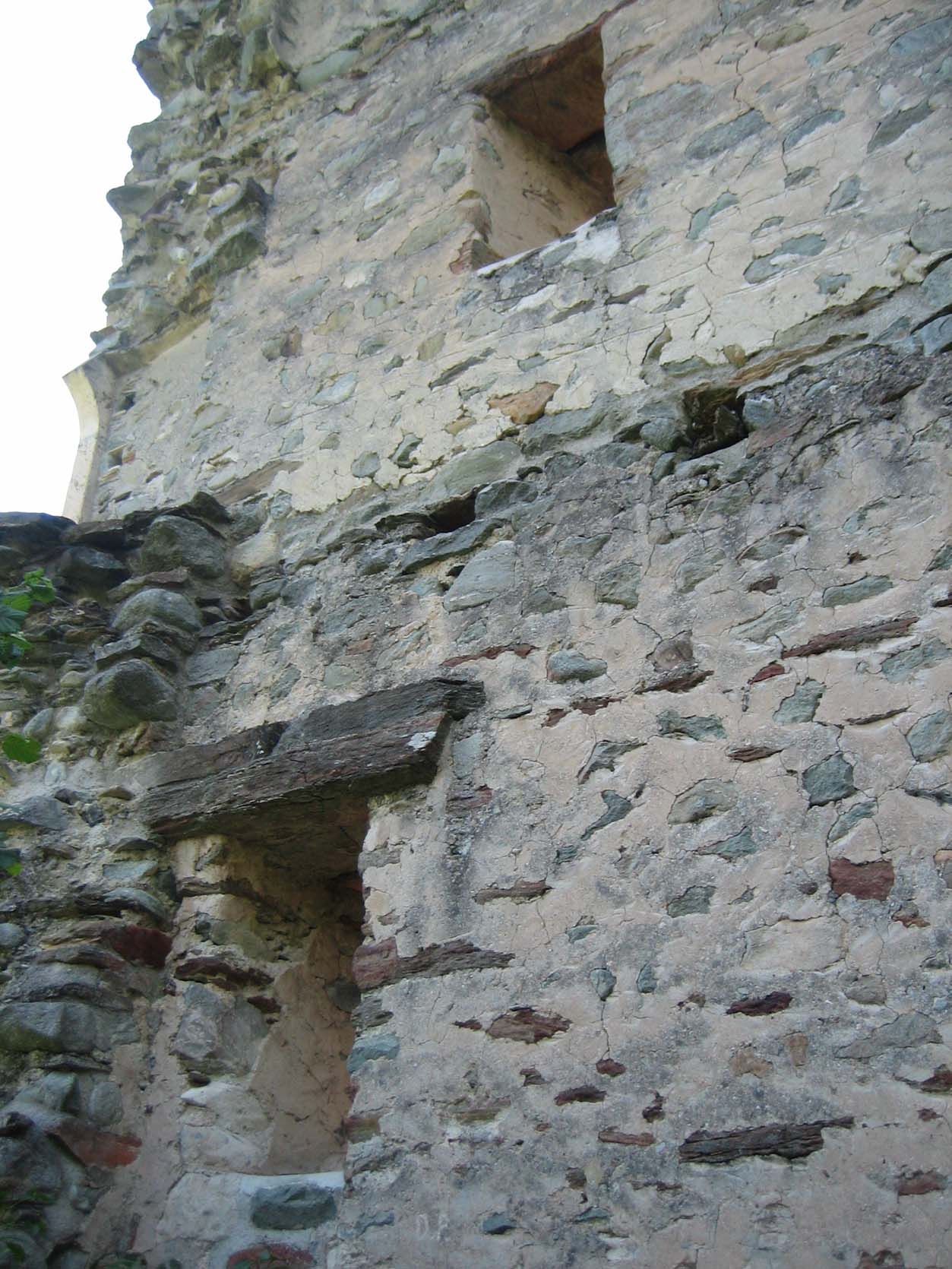
Interior of the castle

== See also ==
- List of castles in Switzerland
