= Ferrera =

- Municipality
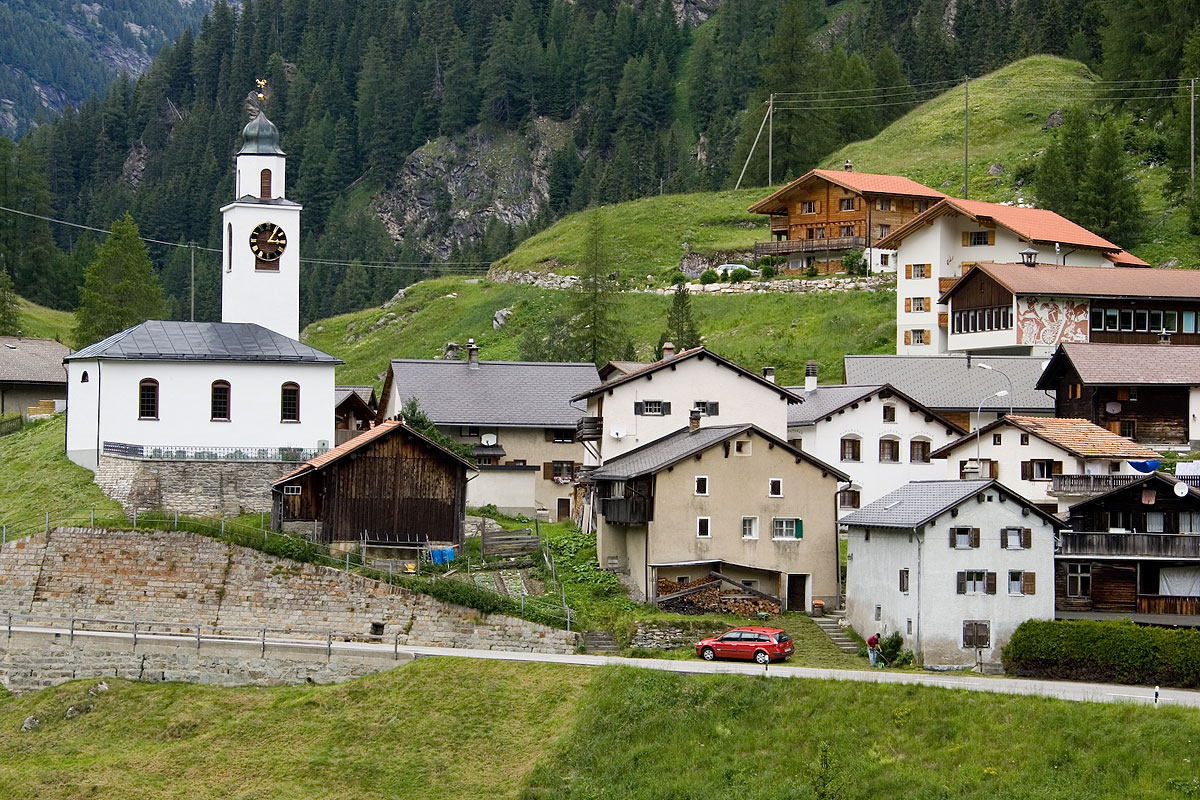

- Flag Coat of arms
- Location of Ferrera
- Location within Switzerland Location within Canton of Grisons
- Coordinates: 46°33′N 9°26′E
- Country: Switzerland
- Canton: Grisons
- District: Viamala

Area
  - Total: 75.46 km^{2} (29.14 sq mi)
- Elevation: 1,316 m (4,318 ft)

Population (December 2020)
  - Total: 79
  - Density: 1.0/km^{2} (2.7/sq mi)
- Time zone: UTC+01:00 (CET)
  - Summer (DST): UTC+02:00 (CEST)
- Postal code: 7444
- SFOS number: 3713
- ISO 3166 code: CH-GR
- Localities: Innerferrera, Ausserferrera
- Surrounded by: Andeer, Avers, Madesimo (IT-SO), Mulegns, Piuro (IT-SO), Pignia, Riom-Parsonz, Salouf, Sufers
- Website: www.ferrera.ch

Ferrera is a municipality in the Viamala Region in the Grisons, Switzerland. It was formed on 1 January 2008 through the merger of Innerferrera and Ausserferrera. Geographically, it covers the entire Ferrera valley.

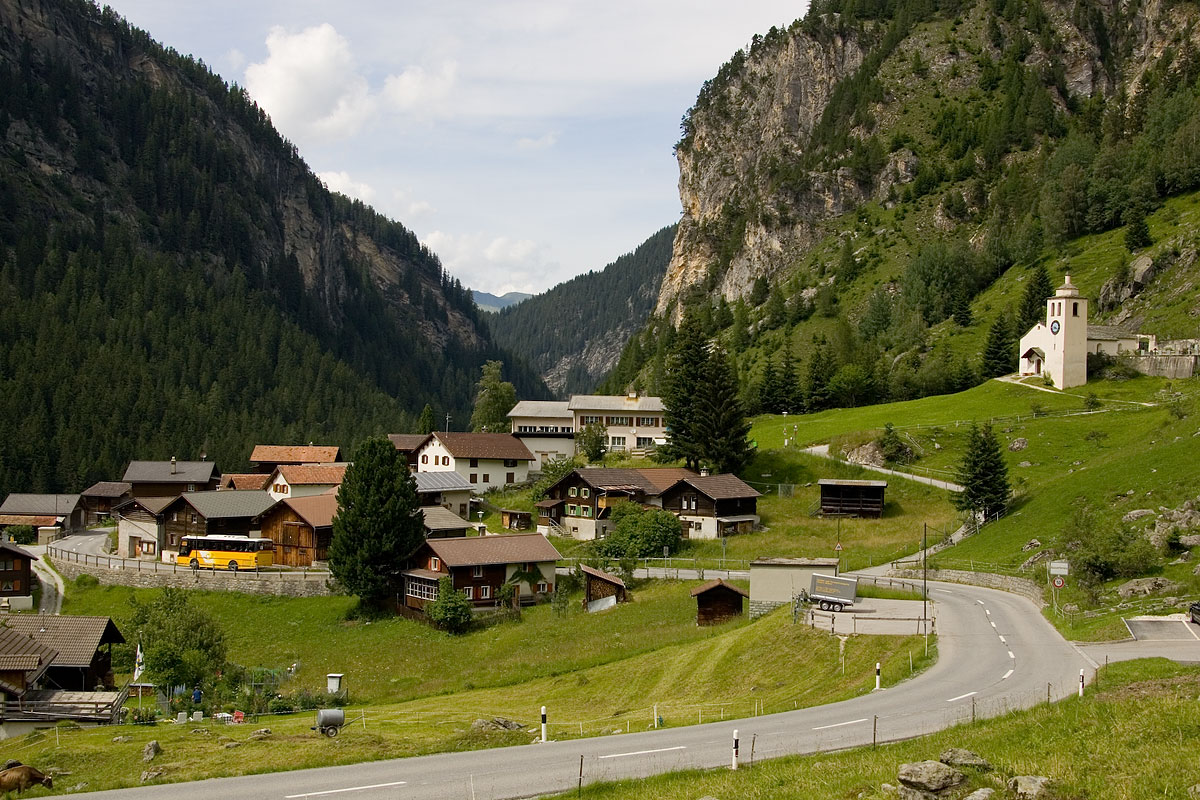
Ausserferrera

== Historical population ==
The combined historical population of the two municipalities is given in the following table:

year	population
1808	167
1850	273
1900	162
1950	145
1960	405^{a}
2000	96

^a Population increase due to construction of the dam at Valle di Lei

== History and geography ==
The municipality of Ferrera was established on 1 January 2008 through the merger of the formerly independent municipalities of Innerferrera (Romansh: Calantgil) and Ausserferrera (Romansh: Farera).

The municipality also includes an exclave in the otherwise Italian Valle di Lei. The exclave encompasses the area around the Lago di Lei dam and was formerly part of the municipality of Innerferrera.

== Languages ==
Languages in Ferrera
Languages	Census of 1980		Census of 1990		Census of 2000	
Languages	Number	Percentage	Number	Percentage	Number	Percentage
German	79	69.30%	75	75.76%	90	91.84%
Romansh	33	28.95%	21	21.21%	1	1.02%
Italian	0	0.00%	2	2.02%	3	3.37%
Population	114	100%	99	100%	98	100%

Languages in Ausserferrera
Languages	Census of 1980		Census of 1990		Census of 2000	
Languages	Number	Percentage	Number	Percentage	Number	Percentage
German	29	58.00%	28	58.33%	44	93.62%
Romansh	19	38.00%	17	35.42%	1	2.13%
Italian	0	0.00%	2	4.17%	1	2.13%
Population	50	100%	48	100%	47	100%

Languages in Innerferrera
Languages	Census of 1980		Census of 1990		Census of 2000	
Languages	Number	Percentage	Number	Percentage	Number	Percentage
German	50	78.13%	47	92.16%	46	94.0%
Romansh	14	21.88%	4	7.84%	2	6.0%
Population	64	100%	51	100%	49	100%

== Weather ==
Innerferrera village in Ferrera has an average of 118.2 days of rain per year and on average receives 1,238 mm (48.7 in) of precipitation. The wettest month is August during which time Innerferrera receives an average of 158 mm (6.2 in) of precipitation. During this month there is precipitation for an average of 12.2 days. The month with the most days of precipitation is May, with an average of 13.3, but with only 141 mm (5.6 in) of precipitation. The driest month of the year is February with an average of 44 mm (1.7 in) of precipitation over 12.2 days.
