= Innerferrera =

- Former municipality
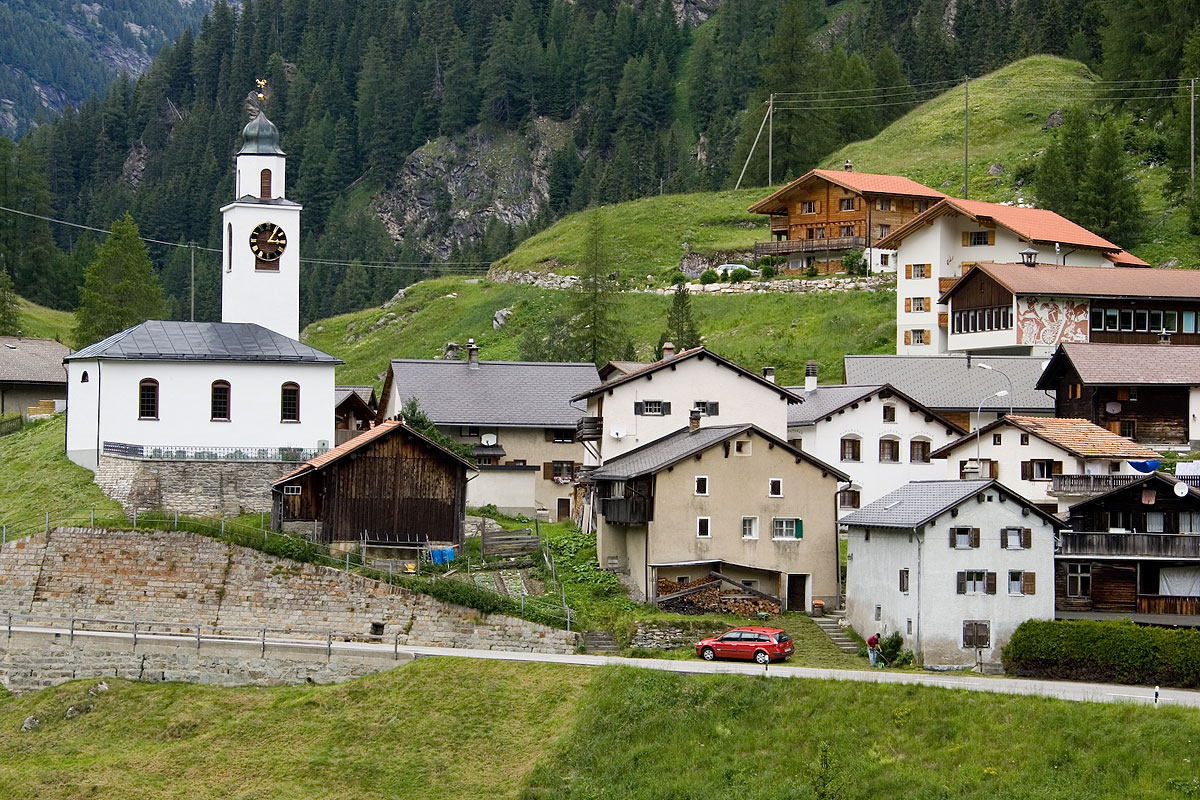

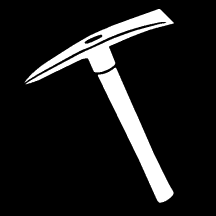
- Flag Coat of arms
- Location of Innerferrera
- Location within Switzerland Location within Canton of Graubünden
- Coordinates: 46°31′N 9°26′E
- Country: Switzerland
- Canton: Graubünden
- District: Hinterrhein

Area
  - Total: 43.95 km^{2} (16.97 sq mi)
- Elevation: 1,480 m (4,860 ft)

Population (December 2007)
  - Total: 38
  - Density: 0.86/km^{2} (2.2/sq mi)
- Time zone: UTC+01:00 (CET)
  - Summer (DST): UTC+02:00 (CEST)
- Postal code: 7445
- SFOS number: 3706
- ISO 3166 code: CH-GR
- Website

Innerferrera (Romansh: Calantgil) is a village in the district of Hinterrhein in the Swiss canton of Graubünden. Previously an independent municipality, it merged on January 1, 2008 with neighboring Ausserferrera to form the municipality of Ferrera.

== History ==
Innerferrera is first mentioned in 1556 as Canicül.

== Geography ==
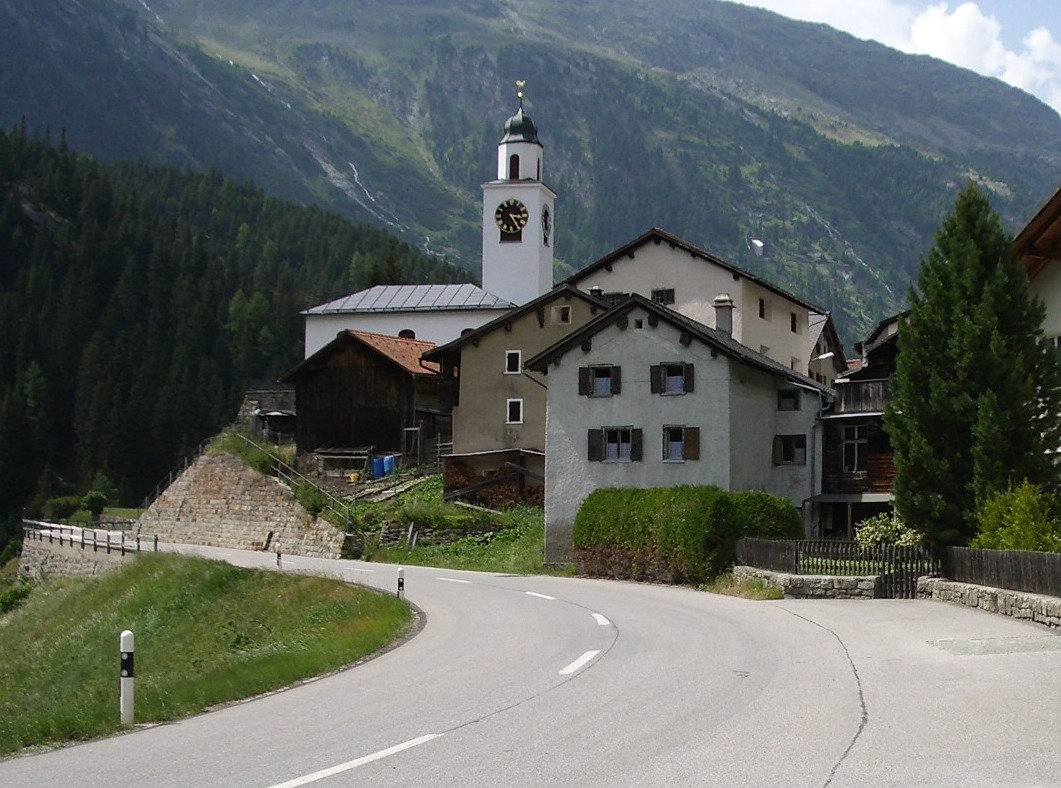
A view of Innerferrera.

Innerferrera has an area, as of 2006, of 44 km^{2} (17 sq mi). Of this, 22.9% is used for agricultural purposes, 11.7% is forested, 0.4% is settled (buildings or roads), and the remainder (65%) is non-productive (rivers, glaciers or mountains).

The municipality is located in the Schams sub-district, of the Hinterrhein district. It is a haufendorf (an irregular, unplanned and quite closely packed village, built around a central square) on the Averser branch of the Rhine. In 2008 Innerferrera merged with Ausserferrera to form Ferrera.

The dam of the Lago di Lei, in the Valle di Lei, is located on its territory.

== Demographics ==
Innerferrera has a population (as of 2007) of 038, of which 5.3% are foreign nationals. Over the last 10 years the population has decreased at a rate of -35.6%.

As of 2000, the gender distribution of the population was 60.5% male and 39.5% female. The age distribution, as of 2000, in Innerferrera is; 9 people or 18.4% of the population are between 0 and 9 years old. 6 people or 12.2% are 10 to 14, and no one is 15 to 19. Of the adult population, 2 people or 4.1% of the population are between 20 and 29 years old. 8 people or 16.3% are 30 to 39, 8 people or 16.3% are 40 to 49, and 6 people or 12.2% are 50 to 59. The senior population distribution is 3 people or 6.1% of the population are between 60 and 69 years old, 3 people or 6.1% are 70 to 79, there are 4 people or 8.2% who are 80 to 89.

In the 2007 federal election the most popular party was the SVP which received 72.7% of the vote. The next three most popular parties were the CVP (18.2%), the SPS (5.5%) and the FDP (3.6%).

The entire Swiss population is generally well educated. In Innerferrera about 84% of the population (between age 25-64) have completed either non-mandatory upper secondary education or additional higher education (either University or a Fachhochschule).

Innerferrera has an unemployment rate of 0%. As of 2005, there were people employed in the primary economic sector and about businesses involved in this sector. 17 people are employed in the secondary sector and there is 1 business in this sector. 5 people are employed in the tertiary sector, with 2 businesses in this sector.

The historical population is given in the following table:

Year	Population
1808	57
1850	106
1880	52
1900	55
1950	67
1960	286^{a}
2000	49

^a Population increase due to construction of the dam at Valle di Lei

== Languages ==
Most of the population (as of 2000) speaks German (93.9%), with Romansh being second most common ( 4.1%) and English being third ( 2.0%).

Languages in Innerferrera GR
Languages	Census 1980		Census 1990		Census 2000	
Languages	Number	Percent	Number	Percent	Number	Percent
German	50	78.13%	47	92.16%	46	94.0%
Romanish	14	21.88%	4	7.84%	2	6.0%
Population	64	100%	51	100%	48	100%

== Weather ==
Innerferrera has an average of 118.2 days of rain per year and on average receives 1,238 mm (48.7 in) of precipitation. The wettest month is August during which time Innerferrera receives an average of 158 mm (6.2 in) of precipitation. During this month there is precipitation for an average of 12.2 days. The month with the most days of precipitation is May, with an average of 13.3, but with only 141 mm (5.6 in) of precipitation. The driest month of the year is February with an average of 44 mm (1.7 in) of precipitation over 12.2 days.
