= Donat, Switzerland =

Donat
- Former municipality
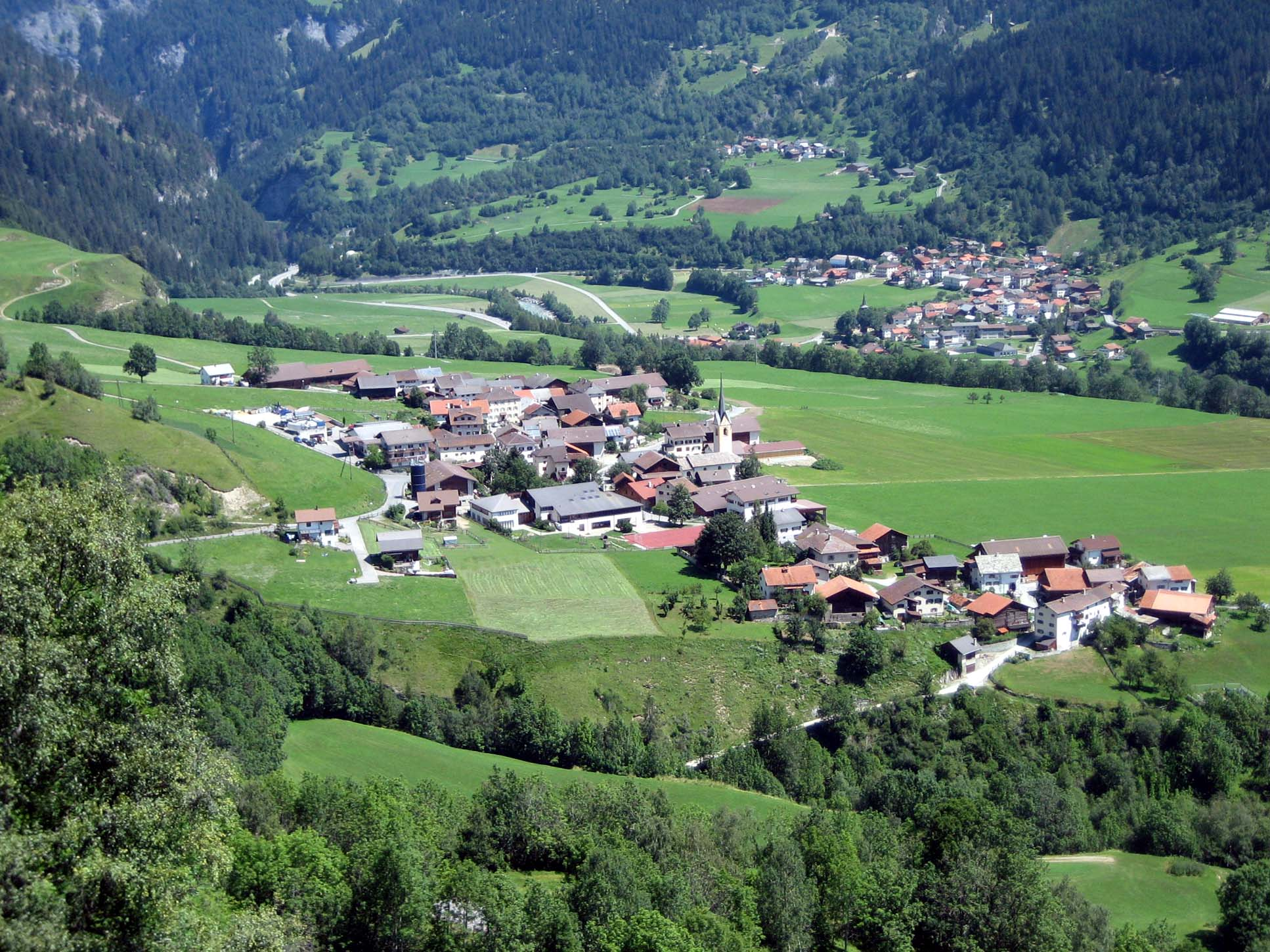

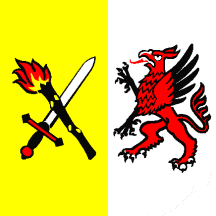
- Flag Coat of arms
- Location of Donat
- Location within Switzerland Location within Canton of Graubünden
- Coordinates: 46°37′44″N 9°25′47″E
- Country: Switzerland
- Canton: Graubünden
- District: Viamala

Area
  - Total: 4.67 km^{2} (1.80 sq mi)
- Elevation: 1,043 m (3,422 ft)

Population (December 2019)
  - Total: 201
  - Density: 43.0/km^{2} (111/sq mi)
- Time zone: UTC+01:00 (CET)
  - Summer (DST): UTC+02:00 (CEST)
- Postal code: 7433
- SFOS number: 3705
- ISO 3166 code: CH-GR
- Localities: Donat, Patzen, Farden
- Surrounded by: Casti-Wergenstein, Clugin, Lohn, Mathon, Pignia, Zillis-Reischen
- Website: www.donat.ch

Donat is a municipality in the Viamala Region in the Swiss canton of Graubünden. On 1 January 2021 the former municipalities of Casti-Wergenstein, Donat, Lohn and Mathon merged to form the new municipality of Muntogna da Schons.

== History ==
Donat is first mentioned in the middle 12th Century as ad Anede.

== Geography ==
Donat had an area, as of 2006, of 4.7 km^{2} (1.8 sq mi). Of this area, 39.9% is used for agricultural purposes, while 51.9% is forested. Of the rest of the land, 2.6% is settled (buildings or roads) and the remainder (5.6%) is non-productive (rivers, glaciers or mountains).

Before 2017, the former municipality was located in the Schams sub-district, of the Hinterrhein district, after 2017 it was part of the Viamala Region. It is located on the lower Schamserberg, and on the left bank of the Hinterrhein. It consists of the settlement of Donat and Pazen-Farden. On 1 January 2003, the municipalities of Donath and Patzen-Fardün merged. At the same time, the names were converted back to Romansh, with Donath becoming Donat, Patzen became Pazen and Fardün became Farden. This change occurred as the combined municipality had a majority of Romansh speakers.)

Donat is a linear village with the sections of Curscheglias, Tarvisch and Tscharviof.

== Demographics ==
Donat had a population (as of 2019) of 201. As of 2008, 5.0% of the population was made up of foreign nationals. Over the last 10 years the population has decreased at a rate of -1.3%.

As of 2000, the gender distribution of the population was 43.0% male and 57.0% female. The age distribution, as of 2000, in Donat is; 20 people or 15.0% of the population are between 0 and 9 years old. 16 people or 12.0% are 10 to 14, and 7 people or 5.3% are 15 to 19. Of the adult population, 11 people or 8.3% of the population are between 20 and 29 years old. 21 people or 15.8% are 30 to 39, 13 people or 9.8% are 40 to 49, and 13 people or 9.8% are 50 to 59. The senior population distribution is 11 people or 8.3% of the population are between 60 and 69 years old, 10 people or 7.5% are 70 to 79, there are 10 people or 7.5% who are 80 to 89, and there are 1 people or 0.8% who are 90 to 99.

In the 2007 federal election the most popular party was the SVP which received 52.6% of the vote. The next three most popular parties were the SPS (25%), the FDP (13.7%) and the CVP (7.3%).

In Donat about 78.1% of the population (between age 25-64) have completed either non-mandatory upper secondary education or additional higher education (either university or a Fachhochschule).

Donat has an unemployment rate of 0.1%. As of 2005, there were 56 people employed in the primary economic sector and about 21 businesses involved in this sector. People are employed in the secondary sector and there are businesses in this sector. 42 people are employed in the tertiary sector, with 5 businesses in this sector.

The historical population is given in the following table:

Year	Population
1835	167
1850	188
1900	128
1950	118
2000	133

== Languages ==
The municipality is almost evenly divided between Romansh- and German-speaking population, with Romansh predominating slightly. Most of the population (as of 2000) speaks Rhaeto-Romance (53.8%), with German being second most common (41.1%) and Serbo-Croatian being third ( 4.1%).

Languages in Donat (merger of Donath and Patzen-Fardün)
Languages	Census 1980		Census 1990		Census 2000	
Languages	Number	Percent	Number	Percent	Number	Percent
German	32	18.29%	50	29.24%	81	41.12%
Romanish	141	80.57%	119	69.59%	106	53.81%
Population	175	100%	171	100%	197	100%

Languages in Donath
Languages	Census 1980		Census 1990		Census 2000	
Languages	Number	Percent	Number	Percent	Number	Percent
German	24	18.90%	30	25.64%	48	36.09%
Romanish	101	79.53%	85	72.65%	75	56.39%
Population	127	100%	117	100%	133	100%

Languages in Patzen-Fardün
Languages	Census 1980		Census 1990		Census 2000	
Languages	Number	Percent	Number	Percent	Number	Percent
German	8	16.67%	20	37.04%	33	51.56%
Romanish	40	83.33%	34	62.96%	31	48.44%
Population	48	100%	54	100%	64	100%
