= Piz digl Gurschus =

Mountain in Switzerland

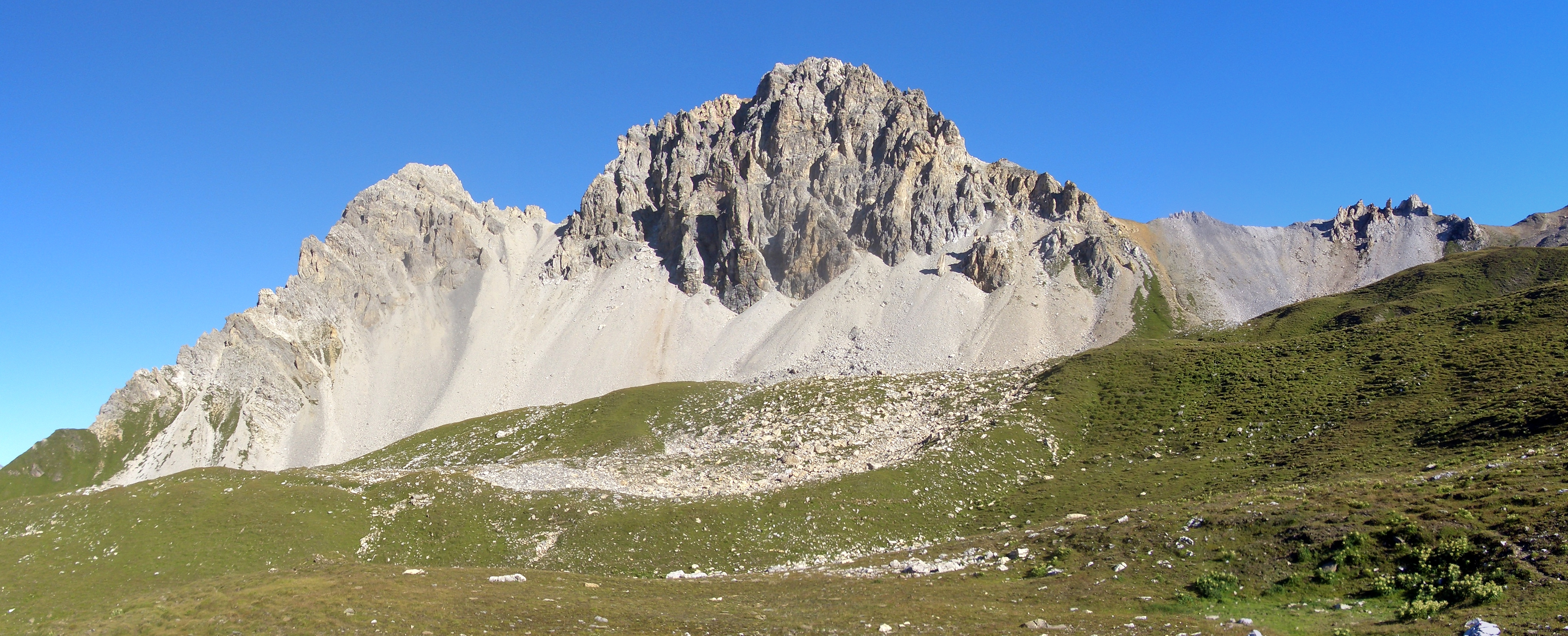
- Piz digl Gurschus from Pass da Schmorras

Highest point
- Elevation: 2,880 m (9,450 ft)
- Prominence: 240 m (790 ft)
- Parent peak: Piz Curvér
- Coordinates: 46°33′37″N 9°29′31″E

Geography
- Location within Switzerland
- Location: Graubünden, Switzerland
- Parent range: Oberhalbstein Alps

Piz digl Gurschus is a mountain of the Oberhalbstein Alps, overlooking Ausserferrera in the Swiss canton of Graubünden. It lies on the range separating the valleys of Ferrera (west) and Sursés (east), west of the watershed.
