= Pignia =

- Former municipality
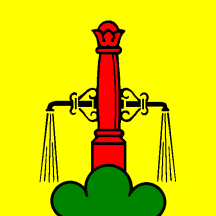
- Flag Coat of arms
- Location of Pignia
- Location within Switzerland Location within Canton of Graubünden
- Coordinates: 46°36′N 9°26′E
- Country: Switzerland
- Canton: Graubünden
- District: Hinterrhein

Area
  - Total: 13.41 km^{2} (5.18 sq mi)
- Elevation: 1,049 m (3,442 ft)

Population (2005)
  - Total: 118
  - Density: 8.80/km^{2} (22.8/sq mi)
- Time zone: UTC+01:00 (CET)
  - Summer (DST): UTC+02:00 (CEST)
- Postal code: 7443
- SFOS number: 3710
- ISO 3166 code: CH-GR
- Surrounded by: Andeer, Ferrera, Clugin, Donat, Salouf, Zillis-Reischen
- Website: www.pignia.ch

Pignia is former a municipality in the district of Hinterrhein in the Swiss canton of Graubünden. On 1 January 2009, it was annexed by Andeer.

The municipality was predominantly German-speaking, with a sizable Romansh-speaking minority.

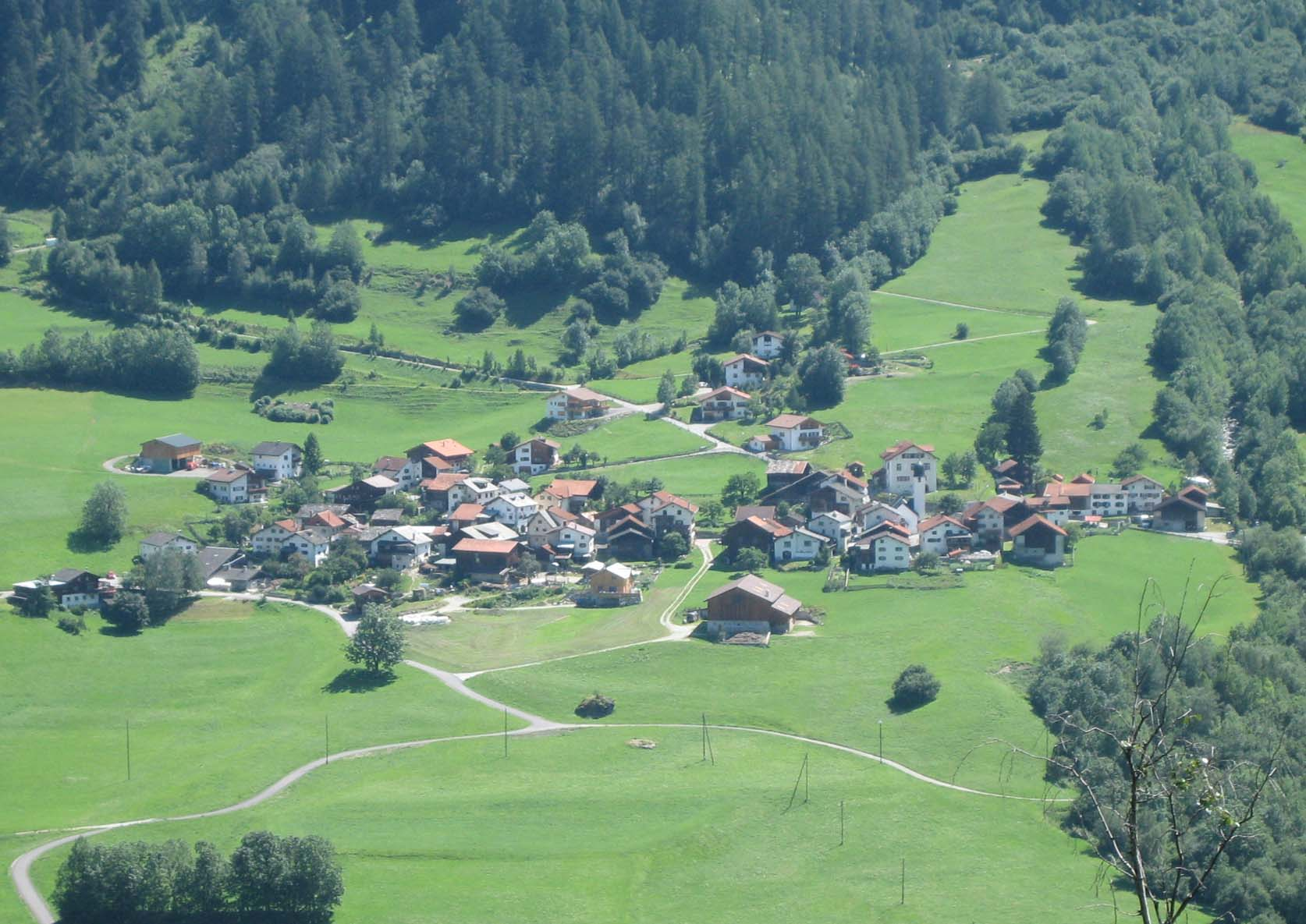
Pignia
