= Andeer =

Municipality in Grisons, Switzerland

- Municipality
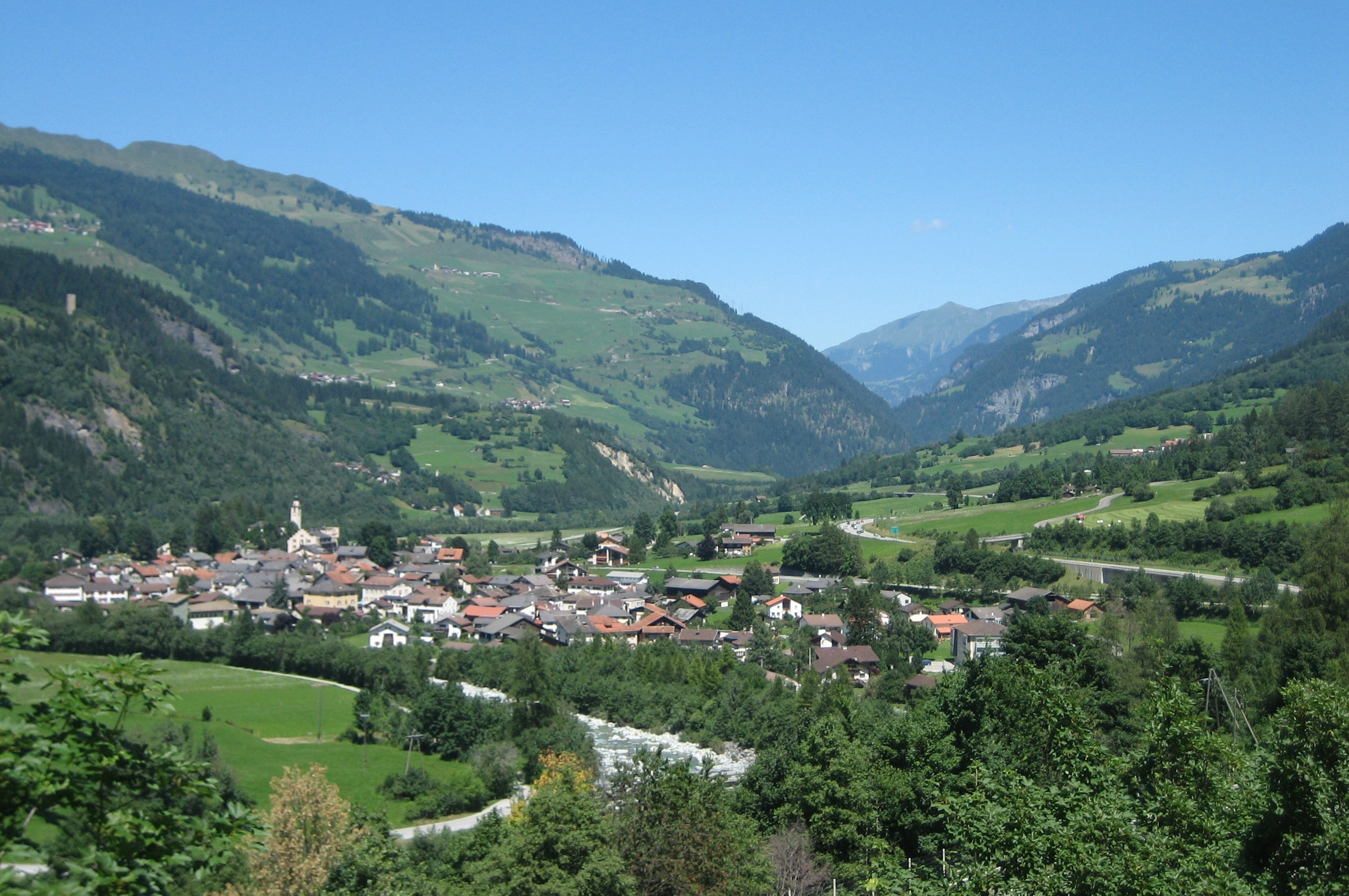

- Flag Coat of arms
- Location of Andeer
- Location within Switzerland Location within Canton of Grisons
- Coordinates: 46°36′N 9°25′E
- Country: Switzerland
- Canton: Grisons
- District: Viamala

Area
  - Total: 46.30 km^{2} (17.88 sq mi)
- Elevation: 982 m (3,222 ft)

Population (December 2020)
  - Total: 916
  - Density: 19.8/km^{2} (51.2/sq mi)
- Time zone: UTC+01:00 (CET)
  - Summer (DST): UTC+02:00 (CEST)
- Postal code: 7440
- SFOS number: 3701
- ISO 3166 code: CH-GR
- Surrounded by: Ferrera, Casti-Wergenstein, Clugin, Pignia, Salouf, Sufers
- Website: www.andeer.ch

Andeer ([ɐnˈder]) is a municipality in the Viamala Region in the Swiss canton of the Grisons. In 2009, Clugin and Pignia merged into Andeer.

== History ==
Aerial view from 2000 m by Walter Mittelholzer (1925)

Roman coins discovered near Andeer indicate that there was a Roman presence in the area during the time of the Roman province of Raetia (from 15 BC). The name of the settlement was presumably Lapidaria, and it would have already been an important stop on the road from Italy.

Andeer is first mentioned in 1208 as Anders.

Around 1820, roads were built over the Splügen Pass and the San Bernardino Pass. When the railroad tunnels through the Alps were completed near the end of the 19th century, they greatly reduced traffic through the region. Since the opening of the San Bernardino road tunnel (A 13) in 1967, Andeer has once again been on a major thoroughfare.

== Geography ==
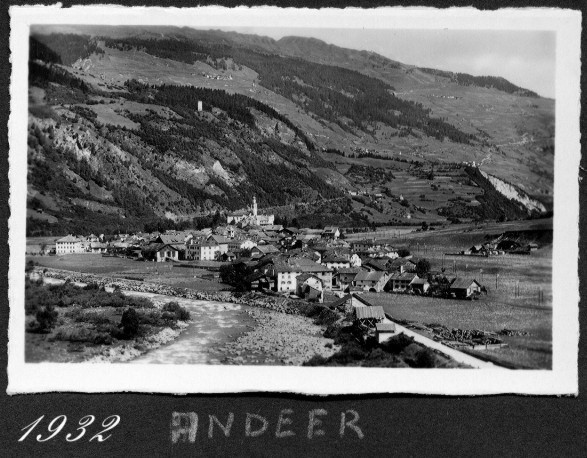
Andeer from a 1932 photograph

Andeer has an area, as of 2006, of 30.5 km^{2} (11.8 sq mi). Of this area, 28.9% is used for agricultural purposes, while 48.5% is forested. Of the rest of the land, 3% is settled (buildings or roads) and the remainder (19.6%) is non-productive (rivers, glaciers or mountains).

Before 2017, the municipality was located in the Schams sub-district, of the Hinterrhein district, after 2017 it was part of the Viamala Region. It consists of the linear village of Andeer and the ruins of Bärenburg castle. Andeer lies in the Schams valley (in Romansch: Val Schons) on the Hinterrhein.

== Demographics ==
Andeer has a population (as of 31 December 2020) of 916. As of 2007, 10.6% of the population was made up of foreign nationals. Over the last 10 years the population has grown at a rate of 3.9%.

As of 2000, the gender distribution of the population was 47.8% male and 52.2% female. The age distribution, as of 2000, in Andeer is; 87 people or 13.0% of the population are between 0 and 9 years old. 42 people or 6.3% are 10 to 14, and 28 people or 4.2% are 15 to 19. Of the adult population, 62 people or 9.3% of the population are between 20 and 29 years old. 103 people or 15.4% are 30 to 39, 85 people or 12.7% are 40 to 49, and 74 people or 11.1% are 50 to 59. The senior population distribution is 78 people or 11.7% of the population are between 60 and 69 years old, 74 people or 11.1% are 70 to 79, there are 33 people or 4.9% who are 80 to 89, and there are 3 people or 0.4% who are 90 to 99.

In the 2007 federal election the most popular party was the SVP which received 44% of the vote. The next three most popular parties were the SPS (26.7%), the FDP (22.1%) and the CVP (6.9%).

In Andeer about 73.9% of the population (between age 25-64) have completed either non-mandatory upper secondary education or additional higher education (either university or a Fachhochschule).

Andeer has an unemployment rate of 1.03%. As of 2005, there were 19 people employed in the primary economic sector and about 7 businesses involved in this sector. 89 people are employed in the secondary sector and there are 13 businesses in this sector. 269 people are employed in the tertiary sector, with 41 businesses in this sector.

The historical population is given in the following table:

year	population
1803	402
1850	591
1880	601
1900	499
1950	631
1960	988

== Weather ==
Andeer has an average of 102.1 days of rain per year and on average receives 933 mm (36.7 in) of precipitation. The wettest month is August during which time Andeer receives an average of 122 mm (4.8 in) of precipitation. During that month, there is precipitation for an average of 11.4 days. The driest month of the year is February with an average of 38 mm (1.5 in) of precipitation over 11.4 days.

== Language ==
Earlier, Andeer was largely Romansh-speaking, but now the majority of the population speaks German, and this is the only language for conducting official business. Most of the population (as of 2000) speaks German (81.0%), with Romansh being second most common (9.1%) and Serbo-Croatian being third (2.5%).

Languages in Andeer GR
Language	Census of 1980		Census of 1990		Census of 2000	
Language	Number	Percentage	Number	Percentage	Number	Percentage
German	364	62.54%	446	75.21%	542	81.02%
Romansh	144	24.74%	87	14.67%	61	9.12%
Italian	47	8.08%	27	4.55%	16	2.39%
Population	582	100%	593	100%	669	100%

== Heritage sites of national significance ==
The Chasa Padrun is listed as a Swiss heritage sites of national significance.

== Culture ==
- Since 2022, the chamber music festival musicaAndeer takes place every year in September, with Artists like Paul Lewis, Kristian Bezuidenhout or Sergey Tanin
