= Piz Cartas =

Mountain in Switzerland

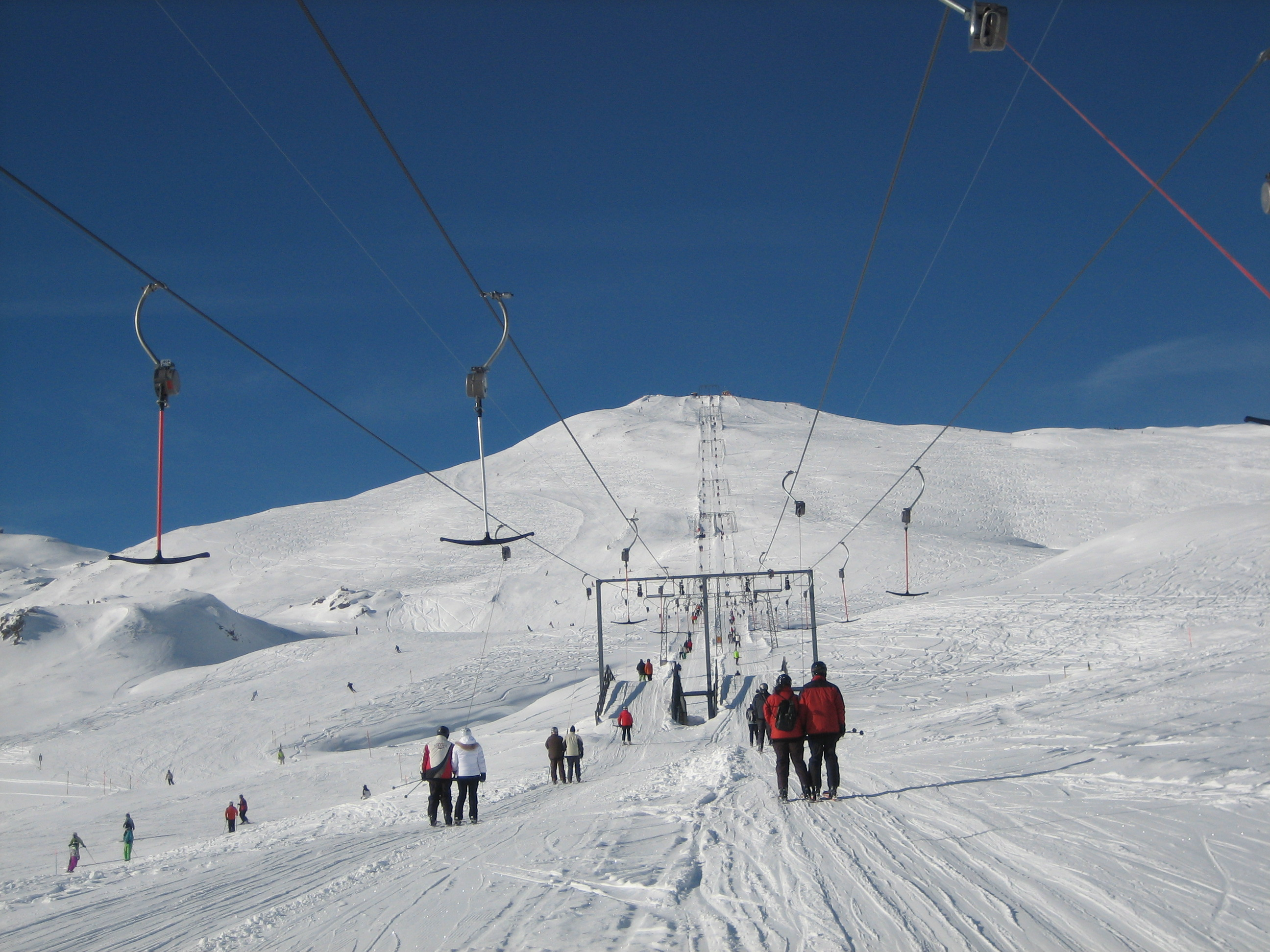
- Piz Cartas from ski lift

Highest point
- Elevation: 2,712 m (8,898 ft)
- Prominence: 110 m (360 ft)
- Parent peak: Piz Curvér
- Coordinates: 46°34′9″N 9°30′51″E

Geography
- Location within Switzerland
- Location: Graubünden, Switzerland
- Parent range: Oberhalbstein Alps

Climbing
- Easiest route: From Radons

Piz Cartas is a mountain of the Oberhalbstein Alps, located west of Savognin in the canton of Graubünden.
