= Clugin =

- Former municipality
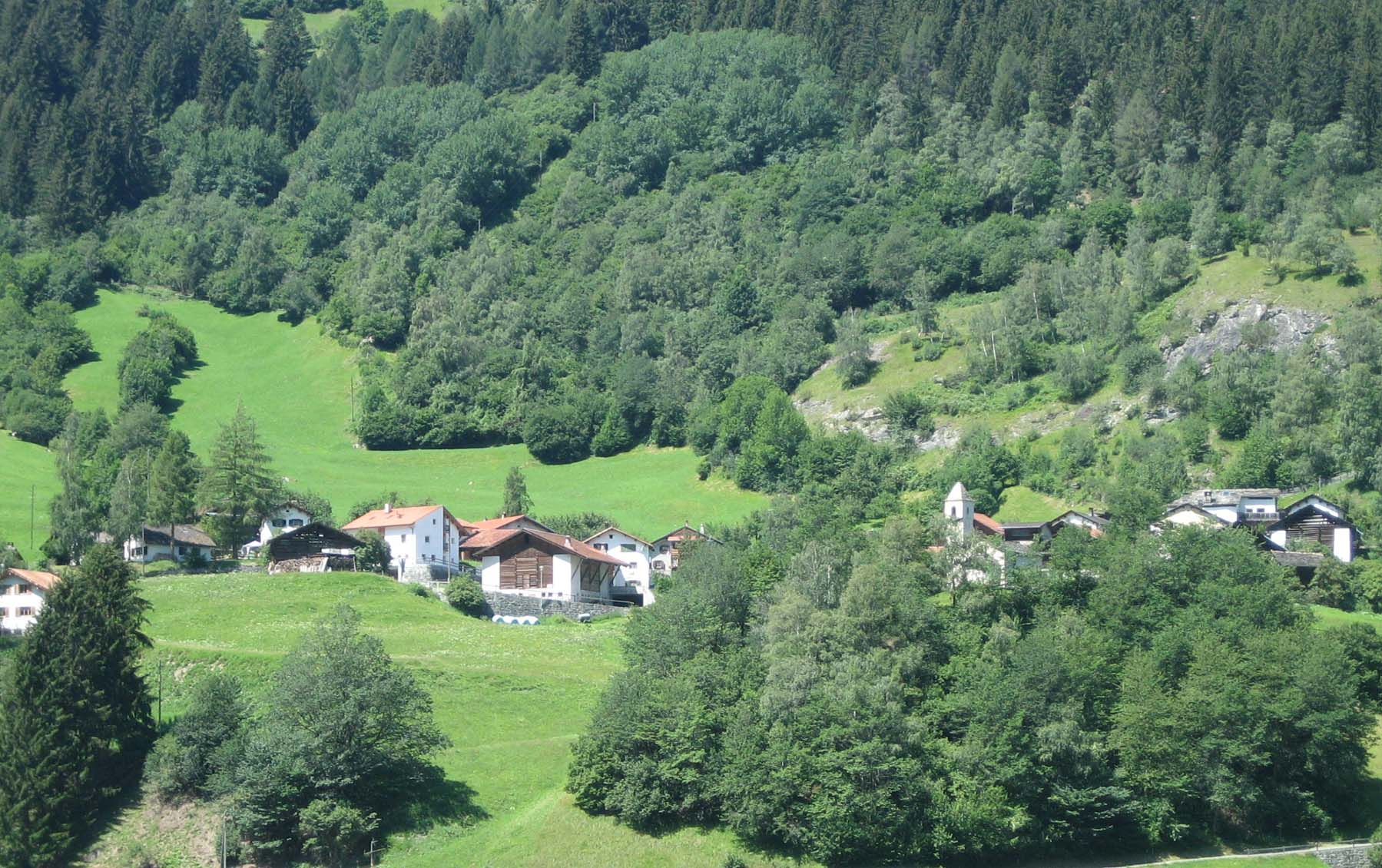

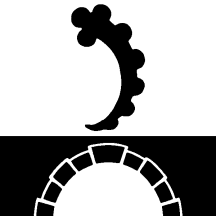
- Flag Coat of arms
- Location of Clugin
- Location within Switzerland Location within Canton of Graubünden
- Coordinates: 46°37′N 9°26′E
- Country: Switzerland
- Canton: Graubünden
- District: Hinterrhein

Area
  - Total: 2.49 km^{2} (0.96 sq mi)
- Elevation: 1,013 m (3,323 ft)

Population (December 2007)
  - Total: 34
  - Density: 14/km^{2} (35/sq mi)
- Time zone: UTC+01:00 (CET)
  - Summer (DST): UTC+02:00 (CEST)
- Postal code: 7442
- SFOS number: 3704
- ISO 3166 code: CH-GR
- Surrounded by: Andeer, Casti-Wergenstein, Donat, Pignia
- Website: www.clugin.ch

Clugin (Romansh: Clugen) is a village in the municipality of Andeer in the district of Hinterrhein in the Swiss canton of Graubünden. In 2009 Clugin merged with Andeer and Pignia to form the municipality of Andeer.

== History ==
Clugin is first mentioned in 1243 as de Cloduno.

== Geography ==
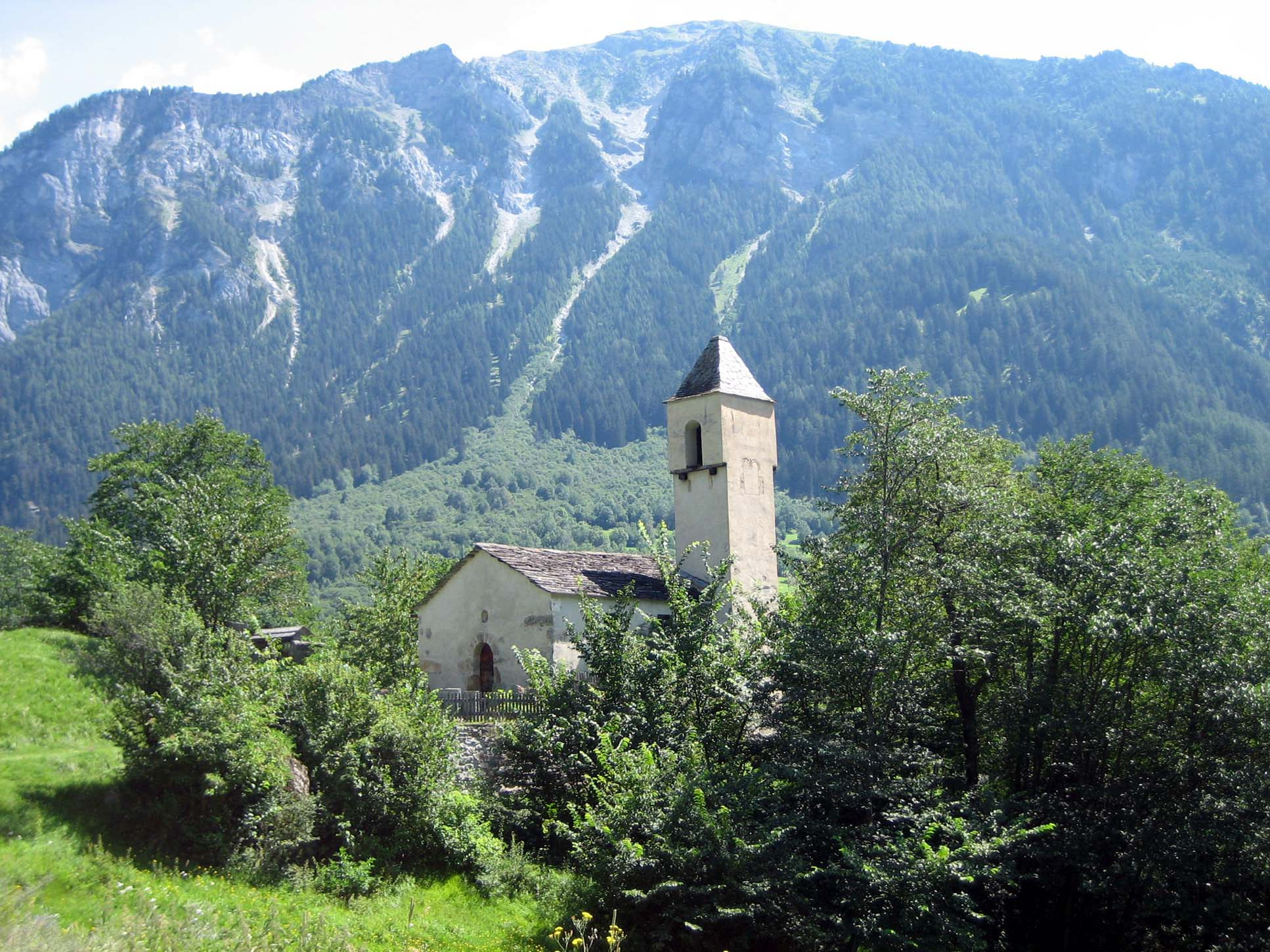
Clugin village church

Clugin has an area, as of 2006, of 2.5 km^{2} (0.97 sq mi). Of this area, 28.7% is used for agricultural purposes, while 62.3% is forested. Of the rest of the land, 2.4% is settled (buildings or roads) and the remainder (6.5%) is non-productive (rivers, glaciers or mountains).

The village is located in the Schams sub-district, of the Hinterrhein district. The Haufendorf (an irregular, unplanned and quite closely packed village, built around a central square) of Clugin is located at the foot of the Schamserberg.

== Demographics ==
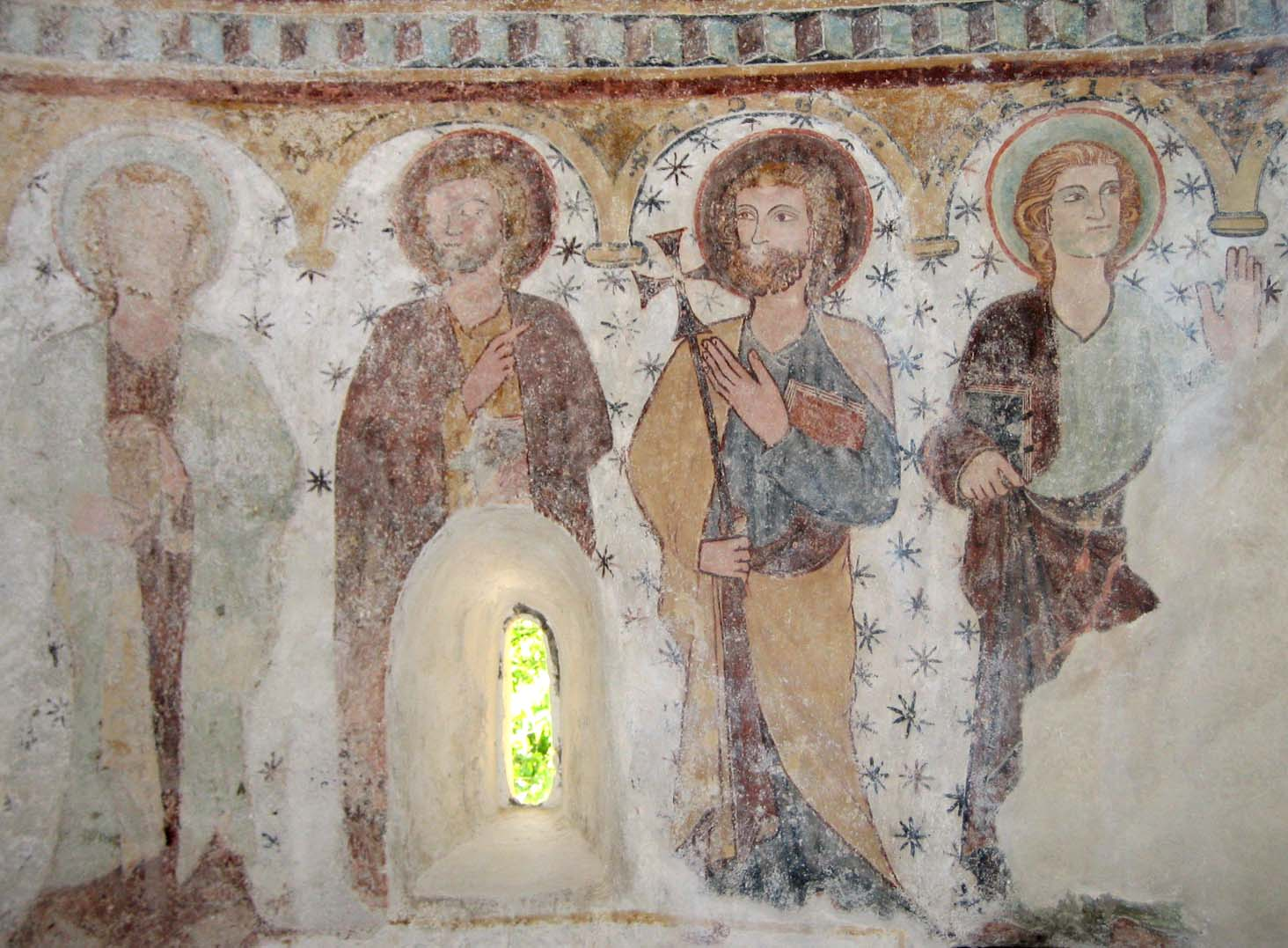
Painting of apostles from the Clugin church

Clugin has a population (as of 2007) of 034, of which 2.9% are foreign nationals. Over the last 10 years the population has decreased at a rate of -17.1%. Most of the population (as of 2000) speaks German (97.0%), with Romansh being second most common ( 3.0%).

As of 2000, the gender distribution of the population was 47.1% male and 52.9% female. The age distribution, as of 2000, in Clugin is; 6 people or 18.2% of the population are between 0 and 9 years old. people or 0.0% are 10 to 14, and people or 0.0% are 15 to 19. Of the adult population, 3 people or 9.1% of the population are between 20 and 29 years old. 6 people or 18.2% are 30 to 39, 2 people or 6.1% are 40 to 49, and 5 people or 15.2% are 50 to 59. The senior population distribution is 6 people or 18.2% of the population are between 60 and 69 years old, 4 people or 12.1% are 70 to 79, there is 1 person or 3.0% who are 80 to 89.

In the 2007 federal election the most popular party was the SVP which received 81.3% of the vote. The next three most popular parties were the CVP (8.8%), the SPS (7.5%) and the FDP (1.3%).

The entire Swiss population is generally well educated. In Clugin about 52.6% of the population (between age 25-64) have completed either non-mandatory upper secondary education or additional higher education (either University or a Fachhochschule).

Clugin has an unemployment rate of 1.19%. As of 2005, there were 4 people employed in the primary economic sector and about 1 business involved in this sector. 2 people are employed in the secondary sector and there is 1 business in this sector. 6 people are employed in the tertiary sector, with 1 business in this sector.

The historical population is given in the following table:

year	population
1835	50
1850	59
1860	72
1900	31
1950	62
2000	33

== Languages ==
The municipality is almost completely German-speaking, and German is the only official language.

Languages in Clugin
Language	Census of 1980		Census of 1990		Census of 2000	
Language	Number	Percentage	Number	Percentage	Number	Percentage
German	43	75.44%	27	84.38%	32	96.97%
Romansh	14	24.56%	5	15.63%	1	3.03%
Italian	0	0.00%	0	0.00%	0	0.00%
Population	57	100%	32	100%	33	100%
