= Ausserferrera =

- Former municipality
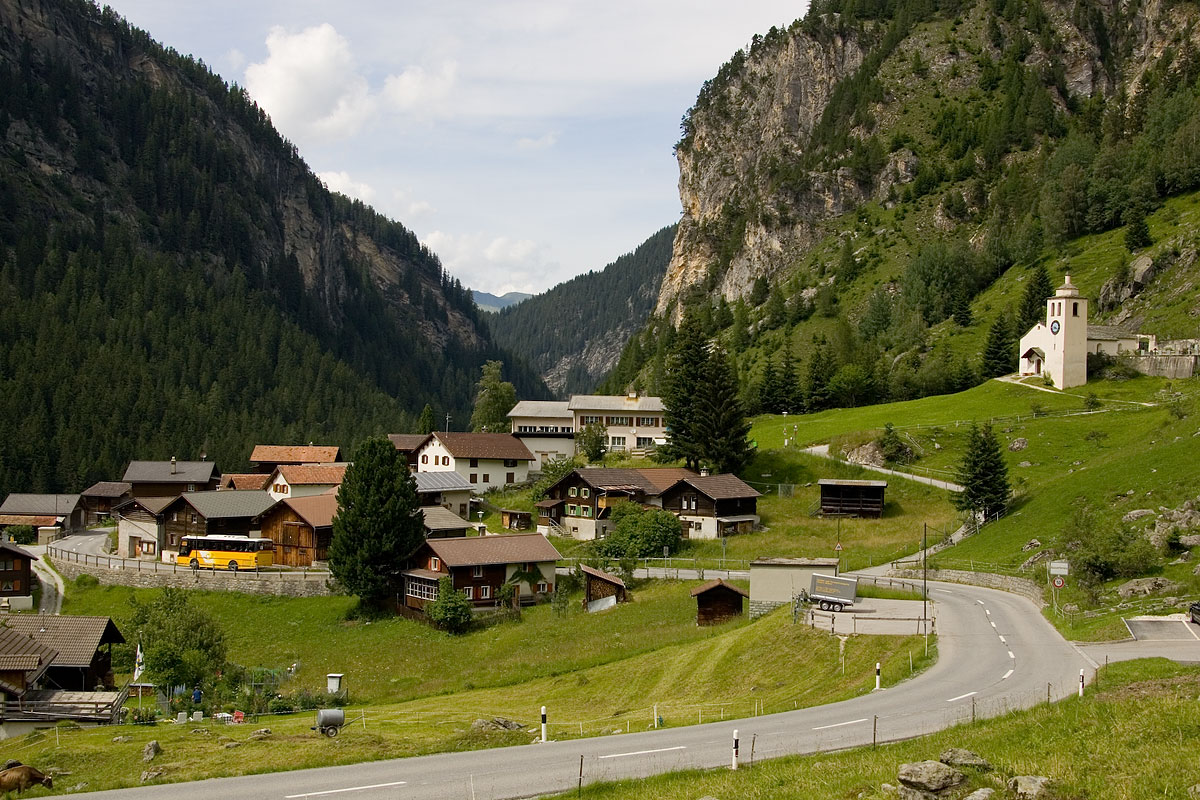

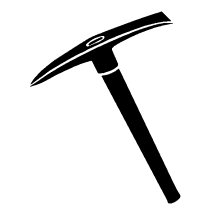
- Flag Coat of arms
- Location of Ausserferrera
- Location within Switzerland Location within Canton of Graubünden
- Coordinates: 46°33′N 9°26′E
- Country: Switzerland
- Canton: Graubünden
- District: Hinterrhein

Area
  - Total: 31.51 km^{2} (12.17 sq mi)
- Elevation: 1,316 m (4,318 ft)

Population (December 2007)
  - Total: 46
  - Density: 1.5/km^{2} (3.8/sq mi)
- Time zone: UTC+01:00 (CET)
  - Summer (DST): UTC+02:00 (CEST)
- Postal code: 7444
- SFOS number: 3702
- ISO 3166 code: CH-GR
- Localities: Cresta
- Website

Ausserferrera (Romansh: Farera) is a village in Hinterrhein District in the Swiss Canton of Graubünden. An independent municipality before, it merged on January 1, 2008 with neighboring Innerferrera to form the municipality of Ferrera.

== History ==
Ausserferrera is first mentioned in the middle 12th century as Farreira. In 1837 it separated from Innerferrera to become an independent municipality.

== Geography ==
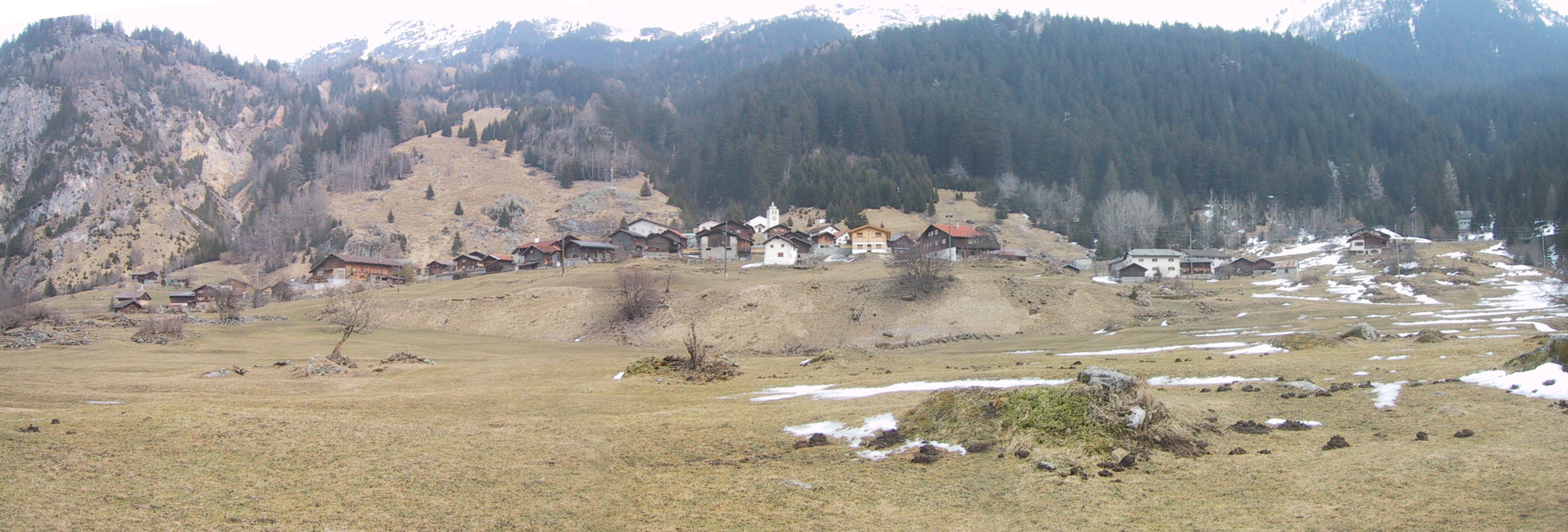
Panorama of Ausserferrera village

Ausserferrera has an area, as of 2006, of 31.5 km^{2} (12.2 sq mi). Of this area, 29.3% is used for agricultural purposes, while 20.4% is forested. Of the rest of the land, 0.5% is settled (buildings or roads) and the remainder (49.7%) is non-productive (rivers, glaciers or mountains).

The municipality is located in the Schams sub-district, of the Hinterrhein district. It is located on the Averser branch of the Rhein. It consists of the haufendorf (an irregular, unplanned and quite closely packed village, built around a central square) of Ausserferrera. In 2008 Ausserferrera merged with Innerferrera to form Ferrera.

== Demographics ==
Ausserferrera has a population (as of 2007) of 46, all Swiss. Over the last 10 years the population has decreased at a rate of -24.6%.

As of 2000, the gender distribution of the population was 54.3% male and 45.7% female. The age distribution, as of 2000, in Ausserferrera is; 6 people or 12.8% of the population are between 0 and 9 years old. No one is 10 to 19. Of the adult population, 4 people or 8.5% of the population are between 20 and 29 years old. 5 people or 10.6% are 30 to 39, 2 people or 4.3% are 40 to 49, and 8 people or 17.0% are 50 to 59. The senior population distribution is 6 people or 12.8% of the population are between 60 and 69 years old, 10 people or 21.3% are 70 to 79, there are 3 people or 6.4% who are 80 to 89, and there are 3 people or 6.4% who are 90 to 99.

In the 2007 Swiss federal election the most popular party was the SVP which received 91.7% of the vote. The next three most popular parties were the FDP (8.3%), the CVP (0%) and the CVP (0%).

The entire Swiss population is generally well educated. In Ausserferrera about 80% of the population (between age 25–64) have completed either non-mandatory upper secondary education or additional higher education (either University or a Fachhochschule).

Ausserferrera has an unemployment rate of 0%. As of 2005, there were 2 people employed in the primary economic sector and about 1 business involved in this sector. people are employed in the secondary sector and there are businesses in this sector. 9 people are employed in the tertiary sector, with 3 businesses in this sector.

The historical population is given in the following table:

year	population
1808	110
1850	167
1900	107
1910	75
1950	78
1960	219

== Languages ==
Until 1950, the village was almost completely Romansh-speaking, but today it is almost completely German-speaking. Most of the population (as of 2000) speaks German (93.6%), with French being second most common ( 2.1%) and Italian being third ( 2.1%).

Languages in Ausserferrera
Languages	Census of 1980		Census of 1990		Census of 2000	
Languages	Number	Percentage	Number	Percentage	Number	Percentage
German	29	58.00%	28	58.33%	44	93.62%
Romansh	19	38.00%	17	35.42%	1	2.13%
Italian	0	0.00%	2	4.17%	1	2.13%
Population	50	100%	48	100%	47	100%
