= League of God's House =

Associate of the Old Swiss Confederacy

League of God's House Gotteshausbund (German) Lia da la Chadé (Romansh) Lega Caddea (Italian)
- 1367–1799
- Flag of the League of God's House Coat of arms of the League of God's House

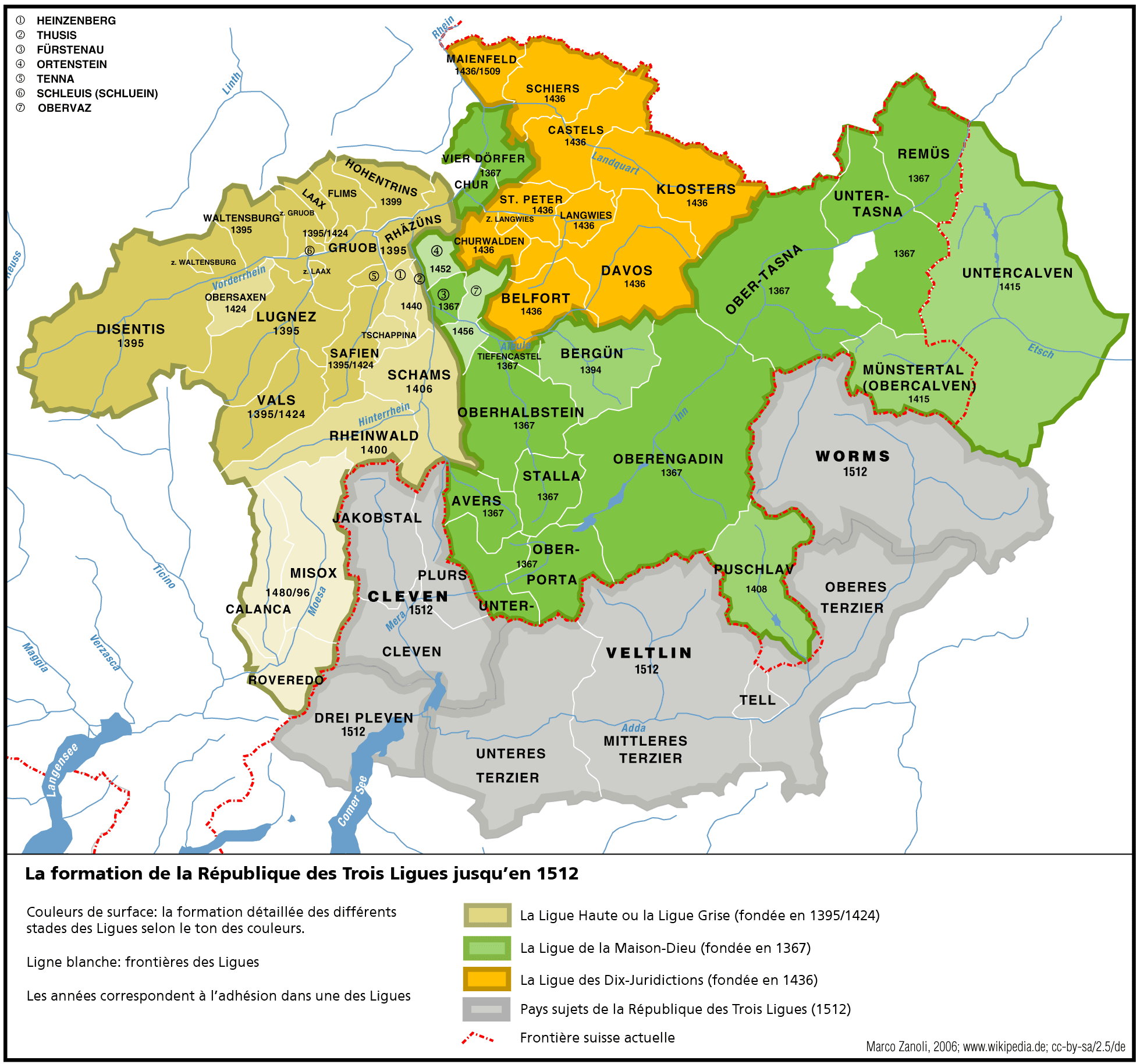
- The League of God's House in green within the Three Leagues. The Grey League is shown in shades of brown, the League of the Ten Jurisdictions is shown in orange and subject territories, subsequently lost, in grey.
- Status: Associate of the Old Swiss Confederacy
- Capital: Chur
- Government: Republic
- Historical era: Middle Ages
  - League of God's House founded: 1367
  - Standing council formed: 1409
  - Closer ties to Three Leagues and de facto independence (HRE): late 15th century
  - Ilanzer Article removes Bishops political power: 1524 to 1526
  - Bundesbrief constitution for the Three Leagues: 23 September 1524
  - Annexed to the Helvetic Republic: 21 April 1799
Preceded by
Chur	Chur
Domleschg	Domleschg
Schams	Schams
Oberhalbstein	Oberhalbstein
Oberengadin	Oberengadin
Underengadin	Unterengadin
Bergell	Bergell
Poschiavo	Poschiavo
Fünf Dörfer	Fünf Dörfer
Succeeded by
Canton of Raetia

The League of God's House (German: Gotteshausbund, Italian: Lega Caddea, Romansh: Lia da la Chadé) was formed in what is now Switzerland on 29 January 1367, to resist the rising power of the Bishopric of Chur and the House of Habsburg. The League allied with the Grey League and the League of the Ten Jurisdictions in 1471 to form the Three Leagues. The League of God's House, together with the two other Leagues, was an associate of the Old Swiss Confederacy throughout the 15th and 16th centuries. After the Napoleonic Wars the League of God's House became a part of the Swiss canton of Graubünden.

== Before the League ==
The region that would become the League of God's House has always been heavily influenced by the Diocese of Chur. The Bishop of Chur is first mentioned in 451 when its Bishop St. Asimo attended the Synod of Milan, but probably existed a century earlier. During the 5th and 6th centuries there is evidence of an extensive Romanisation and conversion to Christianity in the region around Chur. In 536 the region was conquered by the Merovingian Kingdom, but due to distance and isolation it quickly fell back into de facto independence. During this time the region was known as Churrätien or Churwalchen and occupied politically virtually the same territory that the Bishopric of Chur spiritually led. In 773 the political and spiritual power in the region was consolidated into a single family. However this situation only lasted until 806 when Charlemagne split the political and spiritual power into two. This split and the resulting conflicts let to the collapse of Churrätien and the creation of numerous small independent communities, with the power center of Chur in the middle. For centuries after the split, the Bishops of Chur wished to expand their power both politically and spiritually.

== Foundation of the League ==
In the 14th century the core communities of the Bishopric of Chur lay along the north–south road on the Septimer-Julier route. The bishop ruled the region around Chur and had the right of high judgement in the Fünf Dörfer, Chur, Oberhalbstein, Oberengadin, Bergell, Schams, Rheinwald, Unterengadin and Vinschgau.

After 1363 relationships between the bishop of Chur and his subjects worsened. Austrian dukes from the House of Habsburg had acquired the County of Tyrol which included Münstertal and Unterengadin and were trying to expand into the Bishopric of Chur. The foreign and frequently absent bishop Peter Gelyto von Böhmen, who had driven the bishopric deep into debt, was willing to sell the political leadership of the area in exchange for a yearly salary. As a first step, in 1366 he rented out the Fürstenburg fortress at Burgeis in the Vinschgau. In response to this development representatives from the cathedral church of St. Luzius, the valley communities and the city of Chur met in 1365 in Wildenberg Castle in Zernez. On 29 January 1367 they met again in Chur, with revolution in mind.

The meeting represented the three sources of power in the area: first, the spiritual community, represented by personnel from the bishop's cathedral; second, representatives of the large valley communities (six representatives each from Domleschg, Schams, and Bergell; four from Oberhalbstein; three from Oberengadin; and two from Unterengadin); and third, representatives of the citizens of Chur. The group met without the bishop and voted to limit his power sharply and to demand authority over financial matters.

The decision of 1367 was not a formal federation or alliance, but represented a desire to stick together in a crisis. However the decision included a desire to hold future assemblies and to closely monitor the power of the bishop. These future meetings set the stage for closer alliances between the individual communities. In 1409 they established a standing council and appointed a Vogt or bailiff over the bishop. In the spring of 1468 Bishop Ortlieb von Brandis angered the League. They assembled an army, attacked several of the Bishop's estates, including Riom and Greifenstein, and occupied them. The Bishop was forced to ask the city of Zürich to intervene. Zürich negotiated with the League and convinced them to return the castles to the Bishop. Between 1524 and 1526 the Ilanzer Article removed the last vestiges of the bishop's political power.

== Expansion of the League ==
Throughout the 15th century the League continued to expand. The vier Dörfer (the four villages, the rest of the five or fünf Dörfer) joined the League, along with Avers and the uppermost part of the Albula valley. The Münster valley (Münstertal) and Puschlavs valley joined about 1498. During the mid-15th century the League of God's House began to pursue a common foreign policy with the other two Leagues (Grey League and League of the Ten Jurisdictions). In 1499 during the Swabian War the League together with the other two Leagues defeated a Habsburg army at the Battle of Calven and took the Vinschgau from the Bishopric of Chur. Over time the power of the Bishop of Chur weakened, but Chur became the center of the League of God's House. After about 1700, the mayor of Chur automatically became the leader of the League of God's House.

== Three Leagues ==
After about 1471 the three separate Leagues were allied together as the Three Leagues. The Bundesbrief of 23 September 1524 created a constitution for the Three Leagues that would remain until the Napoleonic dissolution of the League. However the League was not a unified state in the modern sense. The Three Leagues worked together as a federation of three states and virtually all affairs of the League were settled by referendum. The Three Leagues were also unique in early modern Europe for practicing a form of communalism, in which each League was founded, governed and defended through collective decisions.

The Three Leagues were normally allied with the Old Swiss Confederacy. Initially this was a response to the expansion of the Habsburgs. The Musso war against the Duchy of Milan in 1520 pushed the League closer to the Swiss Confederacy. The League remained in association with the Swiss until the Napoleonic Wars, when it was absorbed into the Swiss Helvetic Republic founded in 1798. After the Napoleonic Act of Mediation in 1803, the Three Leagues became the canton of Graubünden. The League of God's House remained a distinct part of the political organization of the canton from 1803 until 1854.

== See also ==
- Battle of Calven
- Three Leagues
