= Three Leagues =

Alliance of associates of the Old Swiss Confederacy

Free State of the Three Leagues Freistaat der Drei Bünde (German) Stato libero delle Tre Leghe (Italian) Stadi liber da las Trais Lias (Romansh) Stat liber di Trii Ligh (Lombard)
- 1471–1799
- Coat of arms

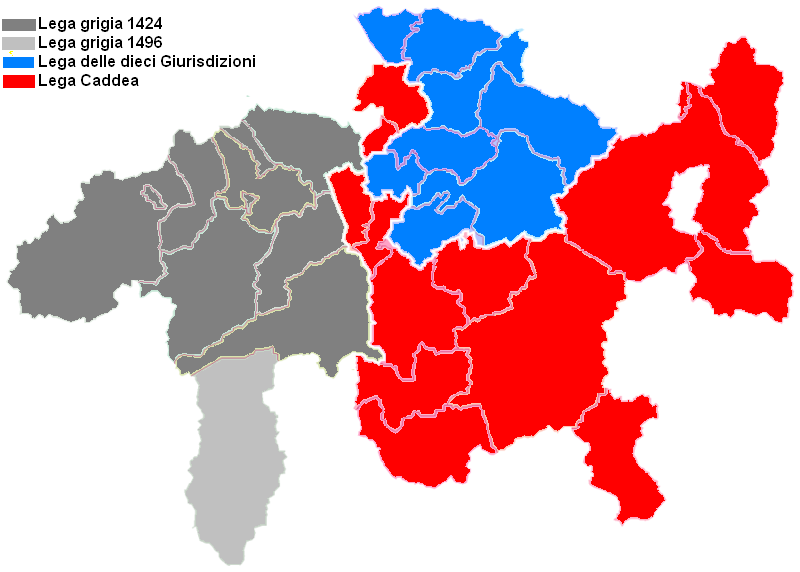
- The foundation of the Three Leagues: Grey League, as at 1424 Moesa, joined the Grey League in 1496 League of the Ten Jurisdictions League of God's House
- Status: Associate of the Old Swiss Confederacy
- Capital: Chur
- Government: Republic
- Historical era: Renaissance, Baroque
  - League of God's House founded: 29 January 1367
  - Grey League founded: 1395
  - Grey League government: 16 March 1424
  - League of the Ten Jurisdictions formed: 8 June 1436
  - Schamserfehde: 1450
  - Closer ties and de facto independence from the Holy Roman Empire: late 15th century
  - Bundesbrief constitution: 23 September 1524
  - French invasion: 1798
  - Annexed to the Helvetic Republic: 21 April 1799
Preceded by
League of God's House	League of God's House
League of the Ten Jurisdictions	League of the Ten Jurisdictions
Grey League	Grey League
	Duchy of Milan
Succeeded by
Canton of Raetia
Cisalpine Republic

The Three Leagues, sometimes referred to as Raetia, was the 1471 alliance between the League of God's House, the League of the Ten Jurisdictions, and the Grey League. Its members were all associates of the Old Swiss Confederacy, and as such enjoyed positive relations with the Confederation, which eventually led to the formation of the Swiss canton of Grisons.

The territory corresponds to the core territory of Raetia Curiensis (ruled by the bishops of Chur as Prince-Bishopric of Chur), the early medieval remnant of the Roman province of Raetia prima.

== League of God's House ==
Coat of arms of the League of God's House

On 29 January 1367, the League of God's House (German: Gotteshausbund, Italian: Lega Caddea, Romansh: Lia da la Chadé), was founded to resist the rising power of the Bishopric of Chur and the House of Habsburg. Bishop Peter Gelyto reacted by transferring the bishopric to the Habsburgs in exchange for a pension from the ducal house.

The instrument of union was signed by envoys of the cathedral chapter, the episcopal Ministerialis, the city of Chur and the districts of Domleschg, Schams, Oberhalbstein, Oberengadin, Unterengadin and Bergell. Other districts joined the league subsequently, including the Poschiavo in 1408 and the Vier Dörfer in 1450.

For some time, Unterengadin, Münstertal and the upper Vinschgau were disputed between the Bishopric of Chur and the County of Tyrol. While the first two could shake off the rule of the Habsburgs as count of Tyrol, in 1618, Untercalven was separated from the League as the last part of the Vinschgau.

With its capital in Chur, the League was composed of the following districts:

- Chur
- Bergell: districts of Ober- and Unterporta
- Calven: districts of Obercalven (Münstertal) and Untercalven (Upper Vinschgau)
- Domleschg: districts of Ortenstein (since 1788 divided into: Ortenstein im Boden and Ortenstein im Berg) and Fürstenau
- Greifenstein: districts of Bergün and Obervaz
- Oberengadin: (divided since 1438) districts of Sur and Suot Funtauna Merla
- Oberhalbstein: districts of Oberhalbstein and Tiefencastel
- Poschiavo
- Ramosch-Stalla-Avers: districts of Ramosch and Stalla (Bivio)–Avers
- Unterengadin: districts of Ober- and Untertasna
- Vier Dörfer

== Grey League ==
Coat of arms of the Grey League (form 1)

Coat of arms of the Grey League (form 2)

The Grey League (Romansh: Lia Grischa) was founded in 1395 in the Upper Rhine valley, as a reaction to various feuds between the Barony of Belmont, the Lordship of Sax, the Barony of Rhäzüns, the Barony of Vaz, County of Werdenberg, Disentis Abbey and the Bishopric of Chur. The capital of the League was Ilanz. The name Grey League is derived from the homespun grey clothes worn by the people; the name of this league later gave its name to the canton of Graubünden.

In Trun, on 16 March 1424, a governing federation was established, comprising:

- The abbot and court of Disentis Abbey;
- The Baron of Rhäzüns — for himself, his lordship and his subject communities of Safien, Tenna and Obersaxen;
- The Baron of Sax-Misox — for himself and his subjects Ilanz, Gruob, Lugnez, Vals, Castrisch and Flims;
- The Count of Werdenberg-Heiligenberg with all his subjects, including Trin and Tamins;
- Communities above the Flimserwald, including Rheinwald and Schams.

Even before 1440, the lordships of Löwenberg, Thusis, Tschappina and Heinzenberg joined the League, despite the count of Werdenberg-Sargans having forbidden them from doing so. In 1441 Cazis Abbey joined; in 1480, the neighborhoods of Mesocco and Soazza in Misox and, in 1496, Gian Giacomo Trivulzio assisted with the union of the remainder of the county of Misox, with the districts of Misox and Calanca.

The Grey League was administered in eight districts:

- Disentis
- Lugnez: districts of Lugnez and Vals
- Gruob: districts of Gruob, Schleuis and Tenna
- Waltensburg: districts of Waltensburg, Laax and Obersaxen
- Rhäzüns: districts of Rhäzüns, Hohentrins and Flims
- Schams-Rheinwald: districts of Rheinwald and Schams
- Thusis: districts of Thusis, Heinzenberg, Tschappina and Safien
- Misox: districts of Misox, Roveredo and Calanca

== League of the Ten Jurisdictions ==
Coat of arms of the League of the Ten Jurisdictions (form 1)

Coat of arms of the League of the Ten Jurisdictions (form 2)

A third league was established on 8 June 1436, by the people of ten bailiwicks in the former county of Toggenburg, as the dynasty of Toggenburg had become extinct. The league was called League of the Ten Jurisdictions (German: Zehngerichtebund; Romansh: Ligia da las diesch dretgiras), with its capital in Davos, and was composed of:

- Belfort
- Davos
- Klosters
- Castels (now part of St. Antönien)
- Schiers
- Schanfigg (St. Peter)
- Langwies
- Strassberg (Churwalden)
- Maienfeld (the town and the castle)
- Neu-Aspermont (which had jurisdiction over Jenins and Malans)

The alliance was mainly designed to resist Habsburg expansion into the region and was administered in seven districts:

- Davos
- Klosters: districts of Klosters-Innerschnitz and Klosters-Ausserschnitz
- Castels: (partitioned from 1622) districts of Luzein and Jenaz
- Schiers-Seewis: (partitioned from 1679) districts of Schiers and Seewis
- Maienfeld: districts of Maienfeld and Malans
- Belfort: districts of Churwalden and (partitioned from 1613) Inner- and Ausserbelfort
- Schanfigg: districts of St. Peter (Ausserschanfigg) and Langwies

== Union of the leagues ==
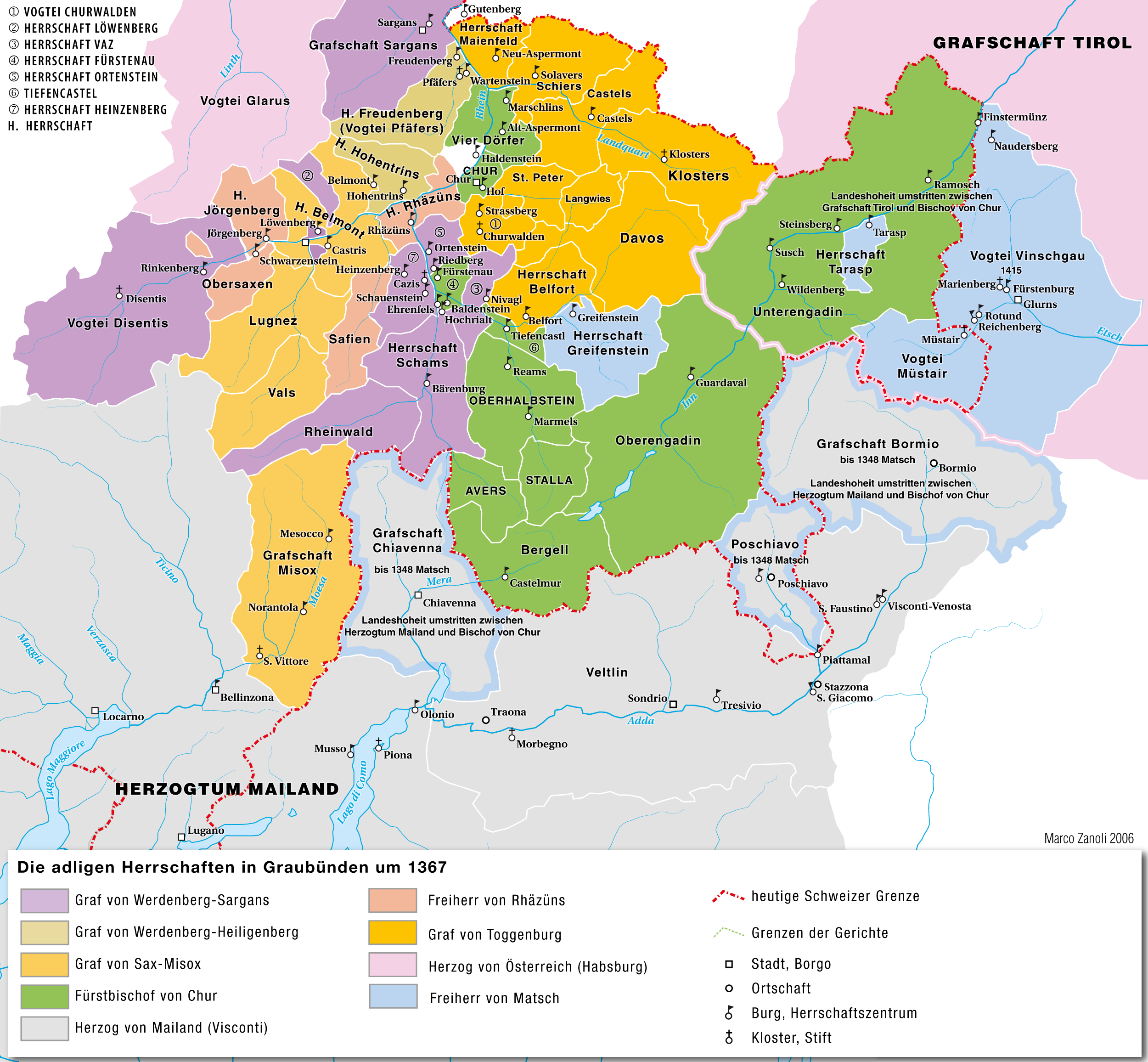
Graubünden in 1367, showing the pre-existing lordships in the region

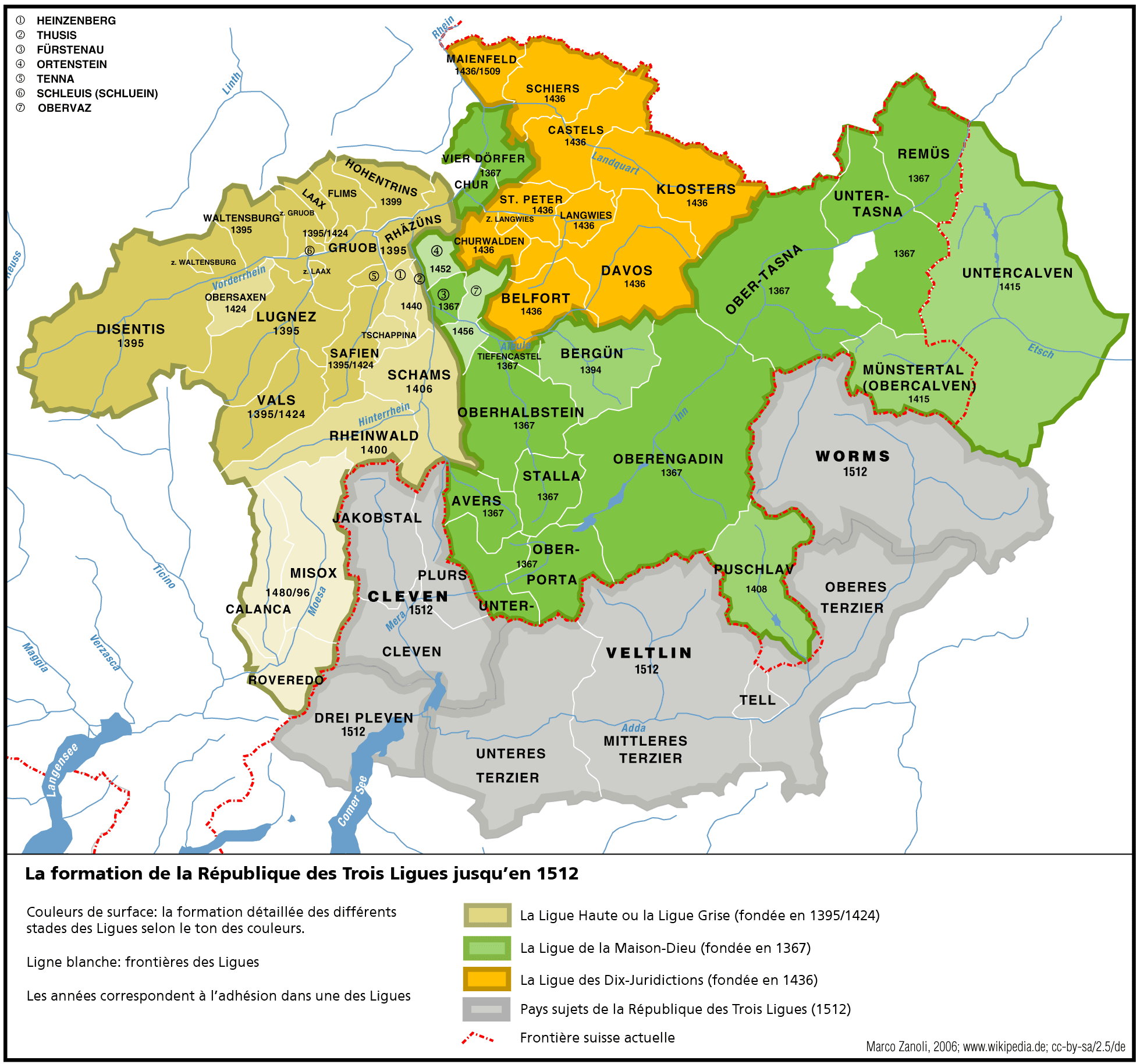
The formation of the Three Leagues up to 1512

The three separate Leagues initially worked together informally, such as in 1450, in the Schamserfehde, a conflict with the house of Werdenberg-Sargans, during which the League of the Ten Jurisdictions allied with the League of God's House. Joint meetings of the three Leagues are evidenced from 1461; closer links date to 1471, when the two leagues allied with the Grey League, but there is no documentary proof of this date. In 1497 and 1498 the Leagues allied with the Old Swiss Confederacy after the Habsburgs acquired the possessions of the extinct Toggenburg dynasty in 1496, siding with the Confederacy in the Swabian War three years later. The Habsburgs were defeated at Calven Gorge and Dornach, helping the Swiss Confederacy and the allied Leagues to be recognised.

After 1499, the Free State de facto separated from the Holy Roman Empire and developed, during the 16th century into a political entity that was unique in early modern Europe. In the early 17th century, it was the only territory in Europe where all decisions were made by communalism, with the Leagues founded, governed and defended by cooperative decisions.

The Musso war of 1520 drove the Three Leagues closer to the Swiss Confederacy.

With the Bundesbrief of 23 September 1524 was created a constitution that endured until the Napoleonic dissolution of the Free State. The supreme power in the Free State was a Bundestag, composed of 63 deputies with responsible to constituencies; this Bundestag alternated between Ilanz, Chur and Davos. By today's standards, the Three Leagues would be considered a federation of three states, rather than a single, unified state; the union had few competencies and virtually all affairs of the Free State were settled by referendum.

The Ilanz Articles of 1524 and 1526 reduced the power of the Bishop of Chur and strengthened the alliance between the Three Leagues. The first articles, adopted 4 April 1524, required priests to live in the communities they served, to earnestly care for the spiritual needs of their congregation and to live a righteous life. The communities had the right to approve their priests and restricted the bishop from judging secular matters. The second articles were adopted on 25 June 1526. They completely removed the bishop's secular power. The parishes could now choose their own priests and appointments to bishop required approval of the entire Bundestag. Additionally church leaders could no longer appoint secular officers, the monasteries were placed under government oversight and various tithes were abolished or reduced. The articles remained the law of League until the 1798 French invasion. With the articles, the secular League authorities became the highest power in the region.

With the invasion of Switzerland by the French Revolutionary Armies, the Three Leagues were absorbed into the Helvetic Republic, as the canton of Raetia. With the Napoleonic Act of Mediation, the Leagues were incorporated into a restored Swiss Confederacy — as the canton of Graubünden — in 1803; the current constitution of the canton dates from 1892.

The districts of Chiavenna, Valtellina and Bormio, previously dependencies of the Leagues, were never a part of the canton of Raetia. However, having permanently been detached from the Leagues after Revolutionary France fomented revolt there, the districts were annexed to the Cisalpine Republic on 10 October 1797. The districts subsequently joined the Austrian client kingdom of Lombardy–Venetia after the Congress of Vienna and eventually become the Italian province of Sondrio. The town of Campione was similarly detached from the Landvogtei of Lugano at the same time, leading to its current position as an Italian enclave within Ticino.
