= Belfort Castle =

Belfort Castle may refer to:

- Belfort Castle (Graubünden) in Switzerland
- Beaufort Castle, Lebanon
