= Grey League =

Associate of the Old Swiss Confederacy

Grey League Grauer Bund (German) Lega Grigia (Italian) Ligia Grischa (Romansh) Liga Grisa (Lombard)
- 1395–1799
- Coat of arms of the Grey League Alternate coat of arms of the Grey League

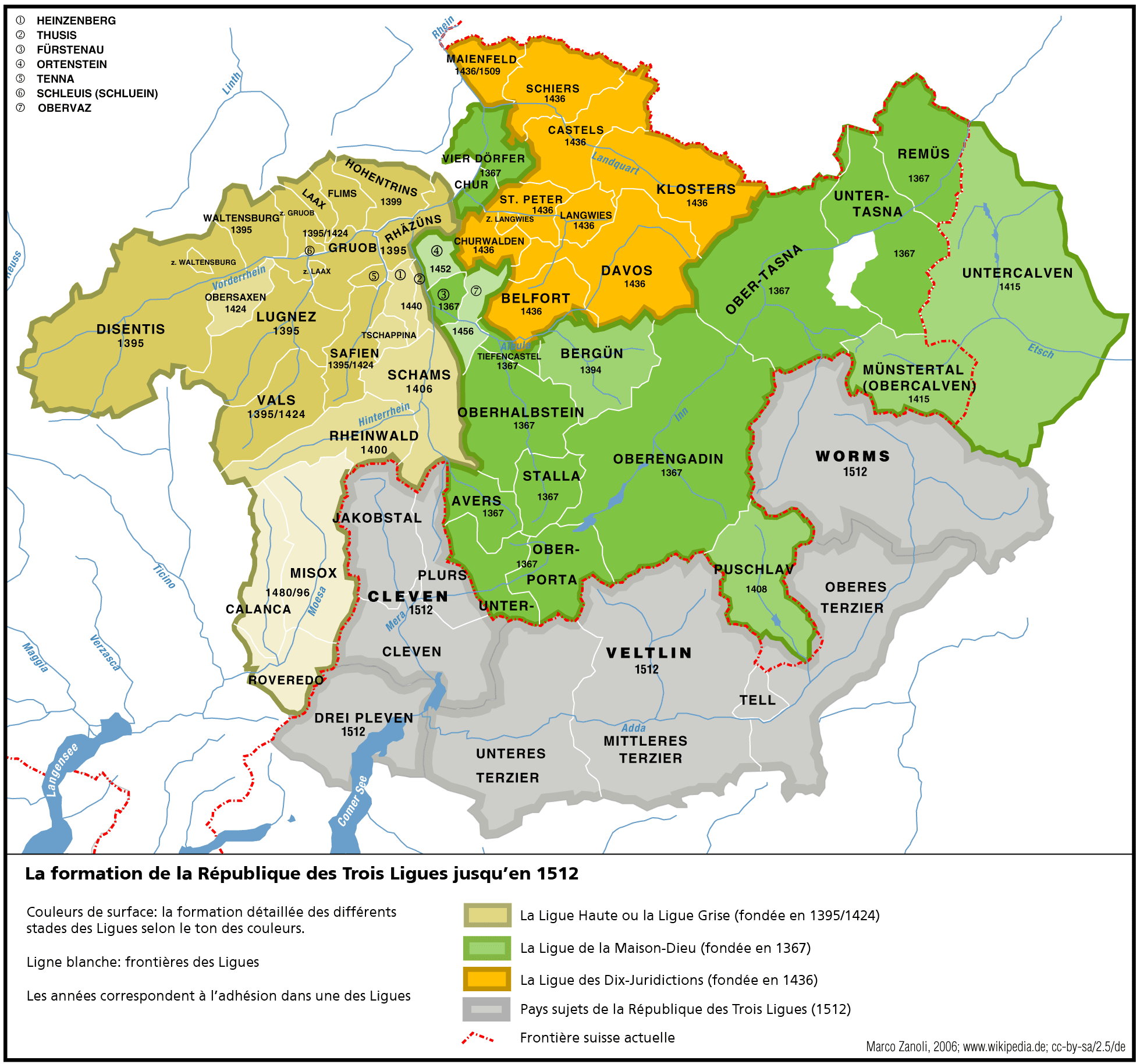
- The Grey League, shown in shades of brown within the Three Leagues. The League of the Ten Jurisdictions is shown in orange, the League of God's House in green and subject territories, subsequently lost, in grey.
- Status: Associate of the Old Swiss Confederacy
- Capital: Ilanz
- Government: Republic
- Historical era: Middle Ages
  - Grey League founded: 1395
  - Government formed: March 16, 1424
  - Schamserfehde: 1450
  - Closer ties to Three Leagues and de facto independence (HRE): late 15th century
  - Bundesbrief constitution for the Three Leagues: September 23, 1524
  - Annexed to the Helvetic Republic: April 21, 1799
Preceded by
| Disentis Abbey | Disentis Abbey |
| Flims | Flimserwald |
| Rhäzüns | Lordship of Rhäzüns |
| Sax-Misox | Barony of Sax-Misox |
| Werdenberg-Heiligenberg | County of Werdenberg-Heiligenberg |
| Werdenberg-Sargans | County of Werdenberg-Sargans |
Succeeded by
| Canton of Raetia |

The Grey League, (Note: (German: Grauer Bund, Italian: Lega Grigia, Romansh: Ligia Grischa or Lia Grischa [ˈliːɐ ˈɡʁiːʒɐ])) sometimes called Oberbund, formed in 1395 in the Vorderrhein and Hinterrhein valleys, Raetia. The name Grey League is derived from the homespun grey clothes worn by the people. The league became part of the canton of Graubünden. The Grey League allied itself to the two other powers of Raetia in 1471, forming the Three Leagues. It was also an associate and ally of the Swiss Confederation and played a role in the buildup to the Thirty Years' War.

== Foundation ==
In the late twelfth century, the communities in the valleys in Raetia were generally small and independent. There were very few large landholders and no central authority. For years blood feuds and battles had raged between the Lords of Belmont, Werdenberg, Rhäzüns and the Bishop of Chur as well as minor nobles. The constant warfare had seriously damaged trade and transportation in the region. To reduce the violence and encourage trade, the leaders and nobles of the valleys proposed forming a league or alliance. This alliance was known as the Grey League.

The Grey League was founded through the alliance of 21 communities from the Vorderrhein and Hinterrhein valleys in the Alps. On February 14, 1395, the three main nobles (the abbot of Disentis, Johannes von Ilanz, Baron Ulrich II von Rhäzüns and Baron Albert von Sax-Misox) of the Vorderrhein together with delegates from the Court Municipalities in Ilanz created an "eternal alliance". Since the alliance was predominantly located in the high country, it was also known as Part Sura (German: Ober Bund or High Alliance). Five days later, Count Johann von Werdenberg-Sargans joined the League at Flimserwald.

The League was more than just a military alliance. It included increasing security on the roads, and required free trade within the League. Laws were standardized and even commoners were granted protection and the right to a court trial. Severe punishments were put in place for murder, manslaughter, robbery and theft. A catalog of crimes, punishments and rights, known as the Landfrieden or Peaceful Land, was established. The Landfrieden standardized laws and punishments, which increased the rule of law. Under the Landfrieden conflicts had to be resolved through the courts and not through open conflict. Landfrieden was the first step from arbitrary punishments handed out by the injured party to a modern penal system.

== Expansion ==
On April 4, 1399, the ruler of Hohentrins (who was sworn to the Count of Werdenberg-Heiligenburg) and the people of Trin, Tamins and the toll bridge to Reichenau joined the League. The entire Vorderrhein valley was now part of the League. On May 25, 1400, the League formed another alliance with Glarus which opened up the southern passes to Glarus' cattle dealers and other traders.

On March 16, 1424, the League met under a legendary maple tree in Trun to reaffirm and expand the League. From this time on, the name Grey League was exclusively used. Grey refers to the grey homespun woolen clothing that was abundant in the region. Trun was set aside as the seat of the impartial League Court, which would be the highest civilian appeals court. Initially twelve judges were appointed, which was later expanded to fifteen.

In 1424 the communities of the Hinterrhein valley, Heinzenberg-Thusis, Schams and Rheinwald, fully joined the League. With this expansion the League now controlled the strategic Spluegen and San Bernardino passes in addition to the Lukmanier Pass in the Vorderrhein valley. On April 23, 1480, the upper Mesolcina (German: Misox) valley joined the League. Then, in 1496 the rest of the valley joined the League. In both 1406 and 1525 a portion of the League of God's House joined the League, and in 1440 Chur (the leader of the League of God's House) joined. In 1471 the League of the Ten Jurisdictions joined the League. The combination of the Grey League, the League of God's House and the League of the Ten Jurisdictions became known as the Three Leagues.

== Three Leagues ==
After about 1471 the three separate Leagues were allied together as the Three Leagues. The Bundesbrief of September 23, 1524, created a constitution for the Three Leagues that would remain until the Napoleonic dissolution of the League. However the League was not a unified state in the modern sense. The Three Leagues worked together as a federation of three states and virtually all affairs of the League were settled by referendum. The Three Leagues were also unique in early modern Europe in that it was the only territory in which all decisions were made cooperatively.

The Three Leagues were normally allied with the Old Swiss Confederacy. Initially this was a response to the expansion of the Habsburgs. The Musso war against the Duchy of Milan in 1520 pushed the League closer to the Swiss Confederacy. The League would remain an associate to the Swiss until the Napoleonic Wars, when it was absorbed into the Helvetic Republic. After the Napoleonic Act of Mediation, the Three Leagues became the canton of Graubünden.

== See also ==
- Three Leagues
- Graubünden
- Swabian War
- Growth of the Old Swiss Confederacy
