= League of the Ten Jurisdictions =

Associate of the Old Swiss Confederacy

League of the Ten Jurisdictions Zehngerichtenbund (German) Lia da las Diesch Dretgiras (Romansh) Lega delle Dieci Giurisdizioni (Italian)
- 1436–1799
- Coat of arms of the League of the Ten Jurisdictions Alternative Coat of Arms of the League of the Ten Jurisdictions

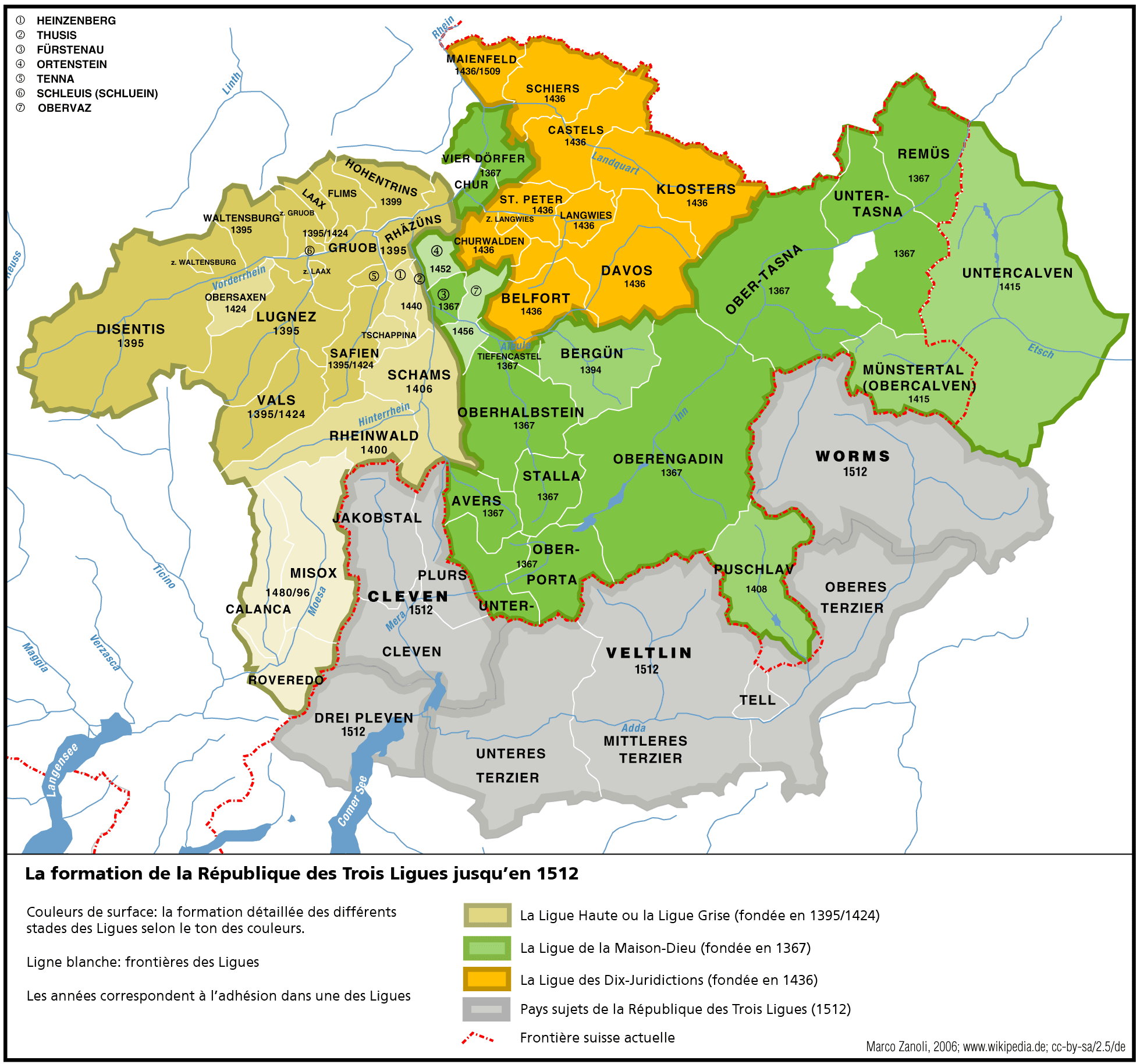
- The League of the Ten Jurisdictions is shown in orange within the Three Leagues. The Grey League is shown in shades of brown, the League of God's House in green and subject territories, subsequently lost, in grey.
- Status: Associate of the Old Swiss Confederacy
- Capital: Davos
- Government: Republic
- Historical era: Middle Ages
  - League of the Ten Jurisdictions founded: 1436
  - Eight Jurisdictions ally with the League of God's House: 1450
  - Alliance with the Grey League: 1471
  - Bundesbrief constitution for the Three Leagues: September 23, 1524
  - All Ten Jurisdictions free from Austria: 1649–1652
  - Annexed to the Helvetic Republic: April 21, 1799
Preceded by	Succeeded by
Counts of Toggenburg	Canton of Raetia

The League of the Ten Jurisdictions was the last of the Three Leagues founded during the Middle Ages in what is now Canton Graubünden of Switzerland. The League was created in the County of Toggenburg after the counts of Toggenburg died out. The League initially existed to resist the power of the House of Habsburg, and quickly allied with the Grey League and the League of God's House. In 1524 the three leagues joined to become the Free State of the Three Leagues, which existed until the Napoleonic dissolution of the Free State. The league was an associate and ally of the Old Swiss Confederacy.

== History ==
The League of the Ten Jurisdictions was the last of the three leagues to be founded. On April 30, 1436, the last Count of Toggenburg, Friedrich VII, died without any male heirs and without a will. The Toggenburg lands included the valley of Prättigau, the upper Albula valley (Belfort), Churwalden, Schanfigg and Maienfeld. For the Toggenburg properties, the future was very uncertain. The communities would either be split among other nobles, or the entire County of Toggenburg would be inherited by the House of Habsburg. The leaders of the communities chose a third path: they reached an agreement with Friedrich's widow, Elisabeth von Matsch. In Davos on June 8, 1436, the former Toggenburg lands formed a pact with the support of Elisabeth. Leaders of the communities of Klosters, Davos, Castels, Schiers, St. Peter (part of Schanfigg), Langwies, Churwalden, Belfort, Maienfeld, and Malans (which was under the jurisdiction of Neu-Aspermont) met and agreed to protect their rights, to only collectively enter other pacts and treaties, to appoint judges from each community and to re-swear the pact every twelve years. It is significant that there were no nobles involved in creating the pact; instead it was the common people from the communities that swore the pact.

The first leader of the League was Ulrich Beeli, the Landammann from Davos, and all future Bundstage (council meetings) occurred in Davos. The League quickly tied itself to the other surrounding leagues. Within one year (1437) eight of the members of the League had already allied with the League of God's House. The entire League allied with the League of God's House by 1450. In 1471 the League allied with the Grey League, forming the Three Leagues.

Soon after the death of the Toggenburgs, the League was not able to prevent the court and judgement rights from being split up and given to local nobles. Although the members of the League had control over the local administration and local politics, they did not have control over high justice and taxes or levies.

Most of the League was given to Wilhelm, Count of Montfort, the lower Prättigau went to the Count of Matsch and Maienfeld and Malans went to the Baron of Brandis. Both the Count of Montfort and Count of Matsch sold their rights to the Duke of Austria, Montfort in 1470 and Matsch in 1477. The duke combined the two territories (the eight jurisdictions) into a single Vogtei which was administered by an appointed Landvogt ('land advocate'), who was generally a member of the League of the Ten Jurisdictions. The Landvogt lived at Castels Castle near Luzein.

The League of the Ten Jurisdictions was very active in the Three Leagues after 1471. After 1486 troops from the League participated in military action with the rest of the Three Leagues. In 1524, the League of the Ten Jurisdiction signed the Bundesbrief ('Confederation Letter'), which created the Three Leagues. However some of the rights within the Ten Jurisdictions were still held by other noble families. For example, the Baron of Brandis held Maienfeld, which was a member of the League. In 1509 the Baron of Brandis separated the community of Maienfeld from his holdings, and transferred it to the emergent Three Leagues. Maienfeld became a Vogtei of the Leagues. This meant that Maienfeld was both a voting member of the League of the Ten Jurisdictions and under the control of the Three Leagues at the same time. Maienfeld indirectly administered itself as a controlled territory of the Three Leagues.

The rights to High Justice were held by the Dukes of Austria, until the League bought these rights from the duke in 1649–1652. It is only after this date that the League could fully participate in the Three Leagues.

== Three Leagues ==
After about 1471 the three separate Leagues were allied together as the Three Leagues. The Bundesbrief of September 23, 1524, created a constitution for the Three Leagues that would remain until the Napoleonic dissolution of the League. However the League was not a unified state in the modern sense. The Three Leagues worked together as a federation of three states and virtually all affairs of the League were settled by referendum. The Three Leagues were also unique in early modern Europe in that it was the only territory were all decisions were made by communalism, with the Leagues founded, governed and defended by cooperative decisions.

The Three Leagues were normally allied with the Old Swiss Confederacy. Initially this was a response to the expansion of the Habsburgs. The Musso War against the Duchy of Milan in 1520 pushed the League closer to the Swiss Confederacy. The League would remain an associate to the Swiss until the Napoleonic Wars, when it was absorbed into the Helvetic Republic. After the Napoleonic Act of Mediation, the Three Leagues became the canton of Graubünden.

== See also ==
- Three Leagues
- Graubünden
