= Oberhalbstein =

Oberhalbstein may refer to:

- Oberhalbstein Alps, mountain range in the Alps of eastern Switzerland and northern Italy
- The German name of the Surses municipality, Switzerland
- The German name of the Surses Valley
