= Grisons =

Largest and easternmost canton of Switzerland

Grisons Graubünden
- Canton
- Kanton Graubünden (German); Chantun Grischun (Romansh); Cantone dei Grigioni (Italian)
- Flag Coat of arms
- Interactive map of Grisons
- Coordinates: 46°45′N 9°30′E
- Capital: Chur
- Subdivisions: 100 municipalities, 11 districts

Government
  - President: Jon Domenic Parolini
  - Executive: Executive Council: Regierungsrat (German); Regenza (Romansh); Governo (Italian); (5)
  - Legislative: Grand Council: Grosser Rat (German); Cussegl Grond (Romansh); Gran Consiglio (Italian); (120)

Area
  - Total: 7,105.39 km^{2} (2,743.41 sq mi)

Population (December 2020)
  - Total: 200,096
  - Density: 28.1612/km^{2} (72.9371/sq mi)

GDP
  - Total: CHF 14.519 billion (2020)
  - Per capita: CHF 72,754 (2020)
- ISO 3166 code: CH-GR
- Highest point: 4,049 m (13,284 ft): Piz Bernina
- Lowest point: 260 m (853 ft): border to Ticino at San Vittore
- Joined: 1803
- Languages: German, Romansh, Italian
- Other languages: Lombard, Walser German
- Website: gr.ch

The Grisons (/ɡriːˈzɒ̃/; French: [ɡʁizɔ̃]) or Graubünden (Swiss Standard German: [ɡraʊˈbʏndn̩]), (Note: Names include: German: (Kanton) Graubünden [ɡraʊˈbʏndn̩]; Romansh: Sursilvan: (Cantun) Grischun [ɡʁiˈʒun]; Vallader: (Chantun) Grischun [ɡriˈʒun]; Puter: (Chantun) Grischun [ɡriˈʒum]; Surmiran: (Cantun) Grischun [ɡriˈʒun]; Sutsilvan: (Cantùn) Grischùn [ɡriˈʒuŋ, ɡriˈʒeu̯ŋ, ɡriˈʒœŋ]; Rumantsch Grischun: (Chantun) Grischun; Italian: (Cantone dei) Grigioni [ɡriˈdʒoːni]; Lombard: (Cantón) Griṡón [ɡriˈzoŋ]; French: (Canton des) Grisons [ɡʁizɔ̃].; See also other names.) more formally the Canton Grisons, is one of the twenty-six cantons of Switzerland. It has eleven districts, and its capital is Chur. The German name of the canton, Graubünden, translates as the "Grey Leagues", referring to the canton's origin in three local alliances, the Three Leagues. The other native names also refer to the Grey League: Grischùn in Sutsilvan, Grischun in the other forms of Romansh, and Grigioni in Italian. Rhaetia is the Latin name for the area. The Alpine ibex is the canton's heraldic symbol.

The largest and easternmost canton of Switzerland, it is also one of the three large southern Alpine cantons, along with Valais and Ticino. It is the most diverse canton in terms of natural and cultural geography, as it encompasses both sides of the Alps and several natural and cultural regions. The diversity of the canton is often compared to that of Switzerland as a whole and warrants it the name of "Little Switzerland". The Grisons is bordered by four cantons as well as Austria, Italy and Liechtenstein.

The state is the only trilingual canton of Switzerland. It is also the only one where Romansh, Switzerland's fourth national language, has official status. Romansh language and culture is an important part of local identity. In 2020 the canton had a population of 200,096. It is the least densely populated canton of Switzerland. The only sizable city in the canton is Chur, as the majority of the population lives in mountainous areas, including some of the most remote valleys of the country. One of the birthplaces of winter sports, the canton is a major tourist destination year-round, including a large number of Alpine resort towns, notably Davos and St. Moritz. The canton is also renowned for its extensive narrow-gauge railway network, operated by the Rhaetian Railway, and linking the capital with most valleys of the Grisons.

Formerly occupied by the Rhaeti, most of the lands of the canton became part of the Roman province called Raetia, which was established in 15 BC, with Curia, a settlement dating back to the Pfyn culture, as capital city. The area later became part of the lands of the diocese of Chur. The late middle ages saw the foundation of the League of God's House, the Grey League and the League of the Ten Jurisdictions. In 1471 an alliance gave birth to the Three Leagues, and before the end of the 15th century, the latter became an ally of the Old Swiss Confederacy. In 1803 the Three Leagues finally became one of the cantons of the Confederation.

== Geography and climate ==
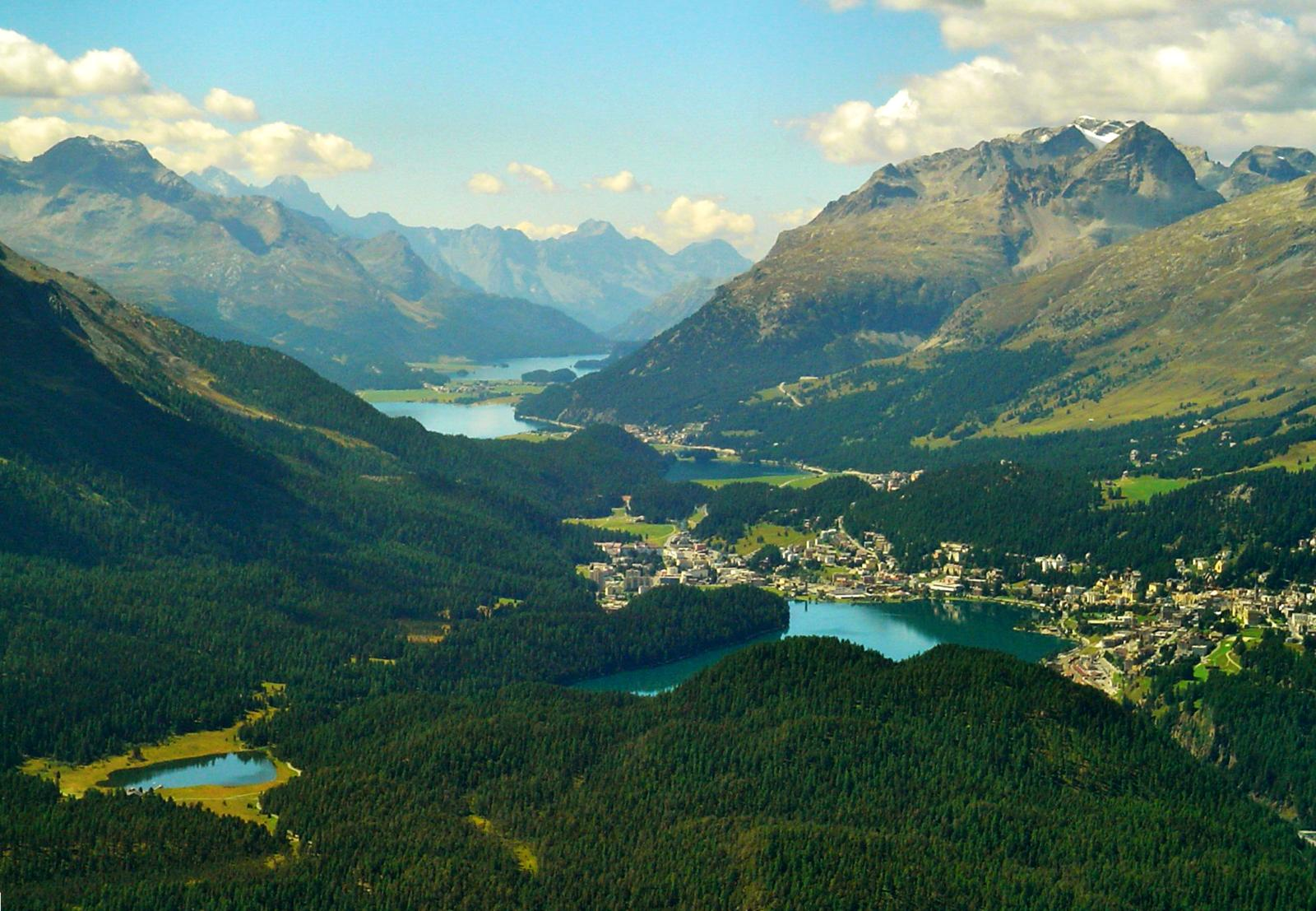
The Engadin (here near St. Moritz and the lakes) is one of the highest valleys of the Alps and the only Swiss region in the basin of the Black Sea.

The Grisons is Switzerland's largest and at the same time easternmost canton. Its geography, essentially marked by the Alps, is complex and encompasses a wide range of climates and ecosystems. It is one of the three large southern Alpine cantons, along with Ticino and Valais, which include regions on the south side of the Alps. But in contrast to those (and all other cantons), it fully extends on both sides of the great Alpine barrier, from the northern plains at Maienfeld to the southern plains at Roveredo. However, a large portion of the canton is neither clearly north nor south of the Alps, it is the Engadin (the "garden of the Inn"), a large inner Alpine valley oriented towards eastern Europe. Therefore there are parts of this canton in four of the five drainage basins of the country. The north of the canton is drained by the Rhine (ending in the North Sea), the south by the Po and Adige through several affluents (Mediterranean Sea), and the Engadin by the Danube through the Inn (Black Sea).

The Grisons lies fully within the Alps, with elevations above sea-level ranging from 260 to 4,049 metres (853 to 13,284 ft). It is both one of the highest and lowest cantons of Switzerland, and the second-highest when considering mean elevation. As a consequence, its topography is extremely rugged and many of the highest settlements in the country (and Europe) are found there, notably in the Upper Engadin. The mountains are numerous; well over 1,000 summits are in the canton. The highest is Piz Bernina, closely followed by numerous peaks in the homonymous range. Other prominent mountains are Piz Russein, Piz Kesch, Calanda, Aroser Rothorn and Rheinwaldhorn (see list of mountains of Graubünden for a more exhaustive list). The canton includes numerous subranges of the Alps other than the Bernina. These are the Albula, the Bregaglia, the Glarus, the Gotthard, the Lepontine, the Livigno, the Plessur, the Oberhalbstein, the Ortler, the Rätikon, the Samnaun, the Sesvenna and the Silvretta ranges.

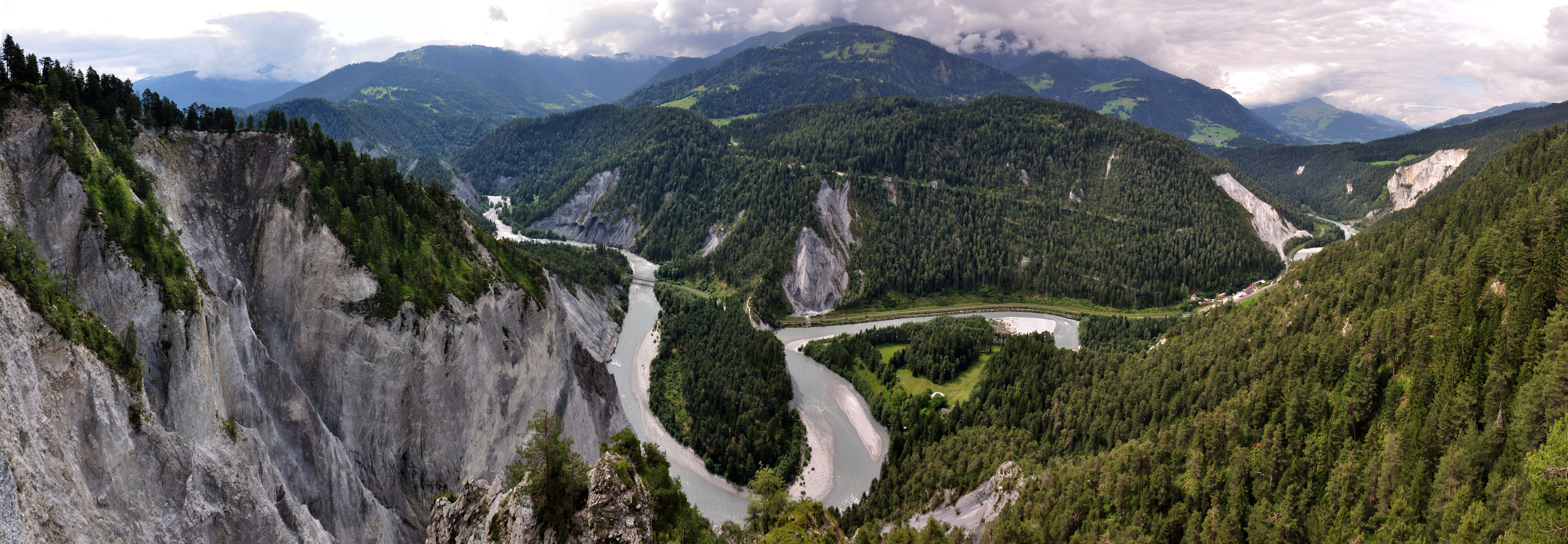
The Anterior Rhine (here at the Rhine Gorge) is one of the largest rivers in the canton.

The regions on the north side of the Alps are all drained by the Rhine and form an intricate network of valleys. The Rhine is both one of the longest rivers within the canton and the only one flowing directly into a sea. The sources of the Rhine are found in the west of the canton and form the Anterior Rhine and the Posterior Rhine. These two rivers converge at Reichenau to form the Rhine in the strict sense of the term. Just after the convergence, the valley opens and its floor constitutes the flattest plains of the canton, from Domat/Ems to Fläsch at the St. Gallen border. In the area around Chur, at the foot of the Calanda, the Rhine progressively changes its direction, from eastward to northward. The Anterior Rhine and Posterior Rhine include numerous tributaries as well before their own convergence. The former constitutes a long and straight valley, the Surselva, shut off from the lower plains by the Rhine Gorge. Its biggest tributaries are the rivers Glogn, Valser Rhine, Rabiusa, forming respectively the Val Lumnezia, the Vals Valley and the Safiental. The other one, the Posterior Rhine, notably collects the waters of the Avers Rhine and the Albula, which in turn collects the waters of the Gelgia and the Landwasser. Similarly to the Anterior Rhine, the upper portion of the Posterior Rhine is also shut off from the plains by the Viamala Gorge. After the convergence with the Albula, the Posterior Rhine forms a wide valley, the Domleschg, until it meets its anterior counterpart. After that, the Rhine collects the water of two important rivers: the Plessur at Chur, forming the valley of the Schanfigg, and the Landquart at the homonymous town, forming the Prätigau.

The Engadin is entirely drained by the Inn and is the only valley in Switzerland in the Danube basin. The Inn is one of the longest rivers in the canton and forms an almost straight valley, from the Maloja Pass to Martina, with a change of direction near Zernez. Despite its length and numerous tributaries, only a few long rivers converge with the Inn. These are the Flaz (forming the Val Bernina), the Spöl (forming the Val da Spöl) and the Clemgia (forming the Val S-charl). In the lower part of the Engadin is also the side valley of Samnaun. The main passes connecting the Engadin with the northern Grisons are (from west to east): the Julier Pass, the Albula Pass and the Flüela Pass.

The valleys on the south side of the Alps are not contiguous to each other and form four distinct regions. The Mesolcina, drained by the Moesa, the Val Bregaglia, drained by the Mera, the Val Poschiavo, drained by the Poschiavino, and the Val Müstair, drained by the Rom. The first three are in the Po basin and the last one is in the Adige basin. While the first two (Mesolcina and Bregaglia) are contiguous to the region north of the Alps, through the San Bernardino Pass, and the Septimer Pass respectively, the three last ones (Bregaglia, Poschiavo and Müstair) are contiguous to the Engadin, through the Maloja Pass, the Bernina Pass, and the Ofen Pass.

Although no large bodies of water are found in the canton, numerous mountain lakes (above 800 m elevation) dot the landscape, some of them being used as reservoirs for hydroelectricity production. The largest natural lakes are Lake Sils, Lake Silvaplana, Lago di Poschiavo and Lake St. Moritz (all in Upper Engadin except that of Poschiavo). Artificial lakes are more numerous, the largest (over 100 ha) being Lago di Livigno, Lago di Lei, Lai da Sontga Maria, Zervreilasee, Lago Bianco, Lai da Marmorera and Lägh da l'Albigna. The total number of lakes has been estimated to 600. (Note: See list of mountain lakes of Switzerland for a more exhaustive list.)

Unlike other large cantons, the Grisons includes very few cities. The largest (and capital city) is Chur. It is followed by Davos, Landquart, Domat/Ems and St. Moritz, which are, however, far less populated. The canton is particularly renowned for its numerous Alpine resort towns, notably two of the aforementioned ones (Davos and St. Moritz), but also Klosters, Arosa, Lenzerheide, Disentis, Flims, Pontresina and Scuol.

The diversity of the climate of the Grisons is high and comparable to that of Switzerland. In the southernmost and lowest regions, vineyards and olives are grown, while on the highest summits, snow is found year-round. The inner valleys, particularly the Engadin, are significantly drier than the north and south side of the Alps, being sheltered by the high mountains of the range. On the south side of the Alps, Grono is one of the top warmest places in the country with an average of 12.4 °C (54.3 °F). The nationwide record temperature of 41.5 °C (106.7 °F) was registered there. The southern valleys are also significantly wetter than the rest of the canton (1,476 mm of rain in Grono, 849 mm in Chur, and 705 mm in Scuol). The coldest places are naturally at high elevations, such as on Piz Corvatsch. The localities of the Upper Engadin are amongst the coldest inhabited regions in the country, notably Samedan with an average temperature of 2.0 °C (35.6 °F). The cantonwide record-low temperature of −37.9 °C (−36.2 °F) was registered there. The low-elevation region of Chur, including the Bündner Herrschaft, experiences naturally less harsh temperatures with an average of 10.0 °C (50.0 °F).

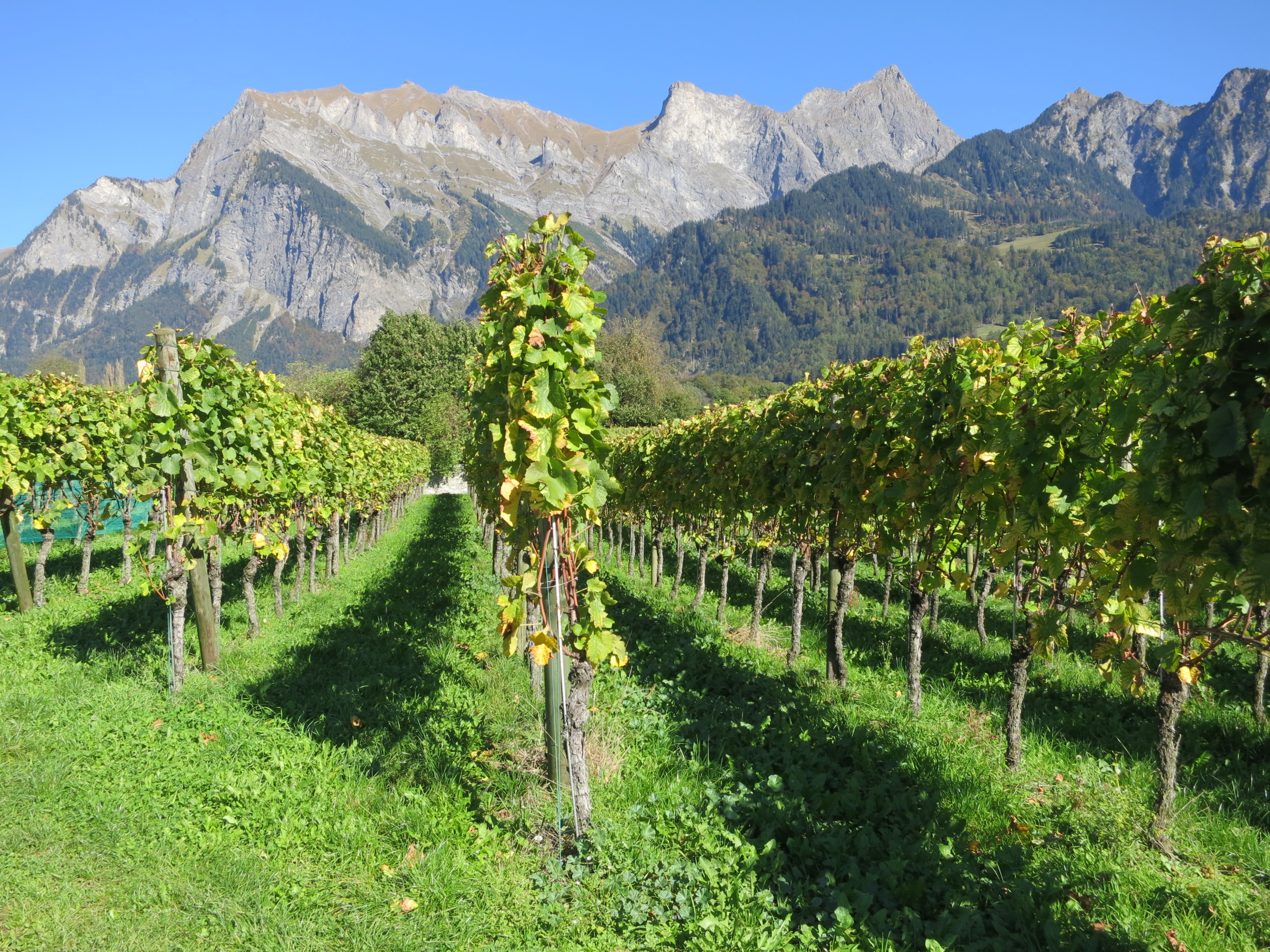
Lowlands: Vineyards of the Bündner Herrschaft, at the foot of the Falknis

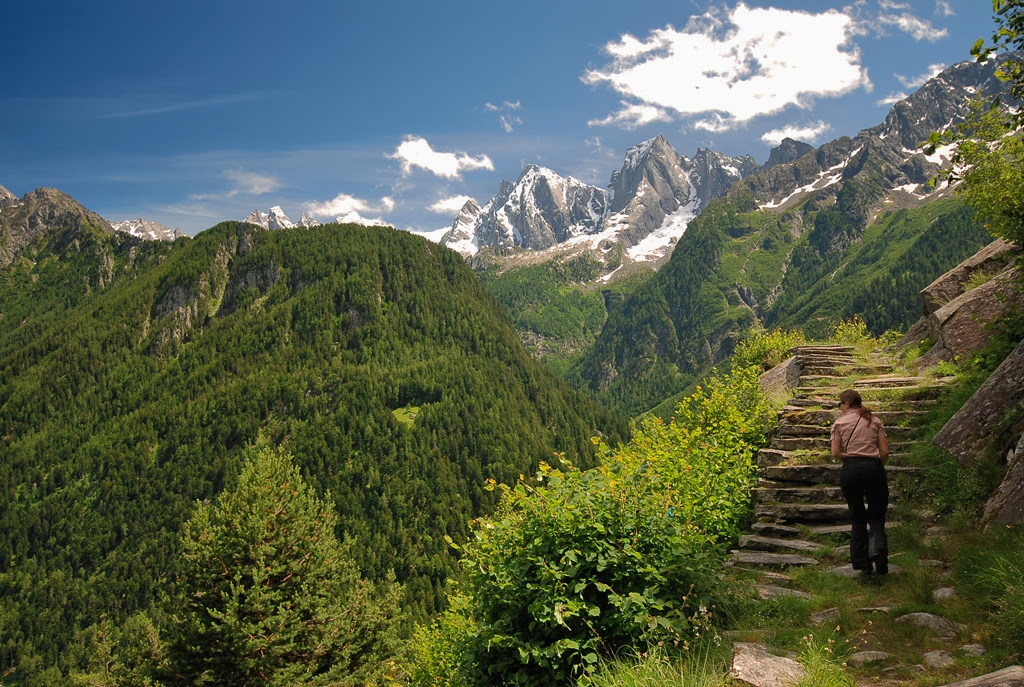
Montane zone: Val Bregaglia, at the foot of Piz Badile

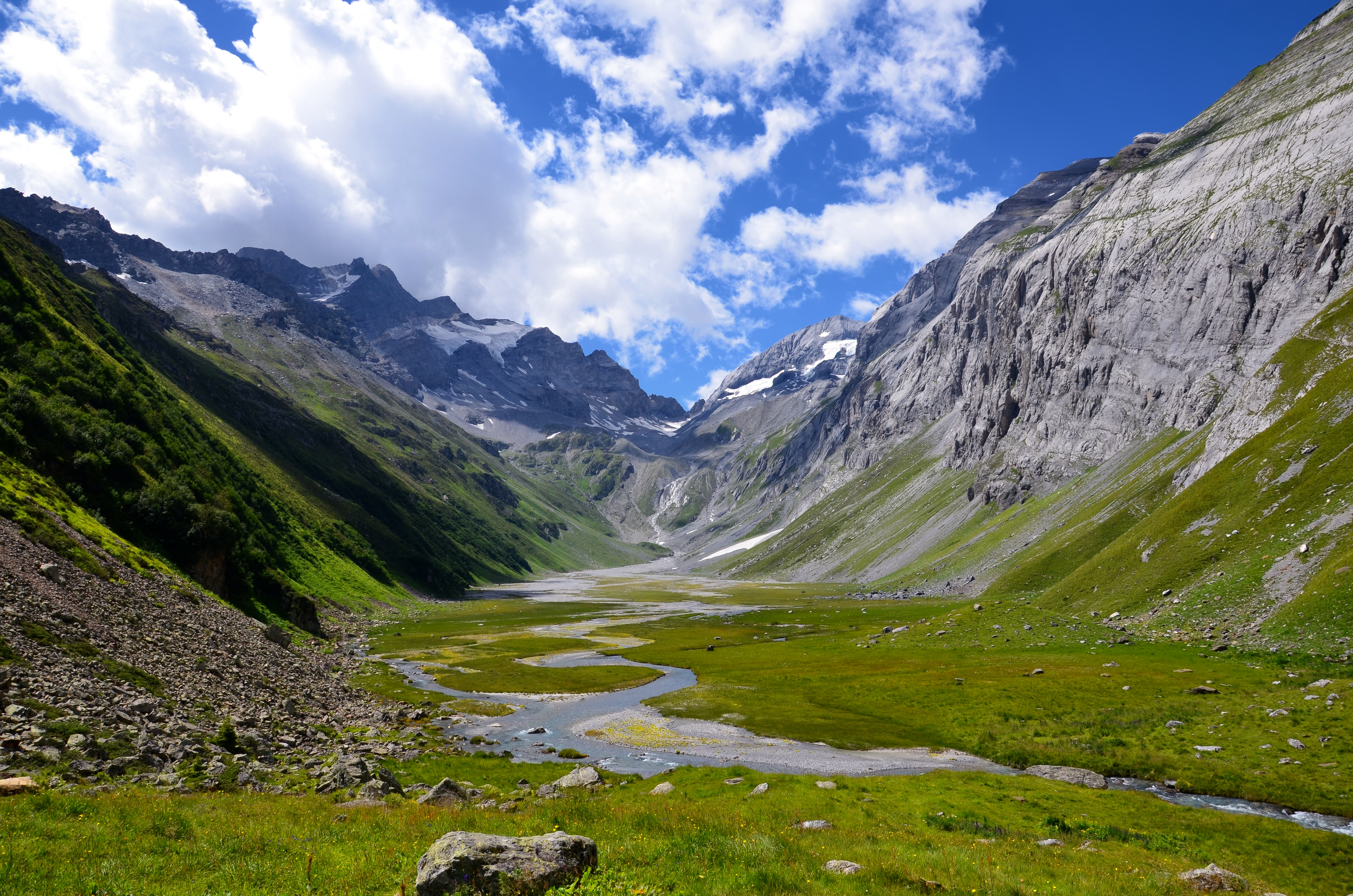
Alpine zone: Val Frisal, at the foot of Piz Durschin

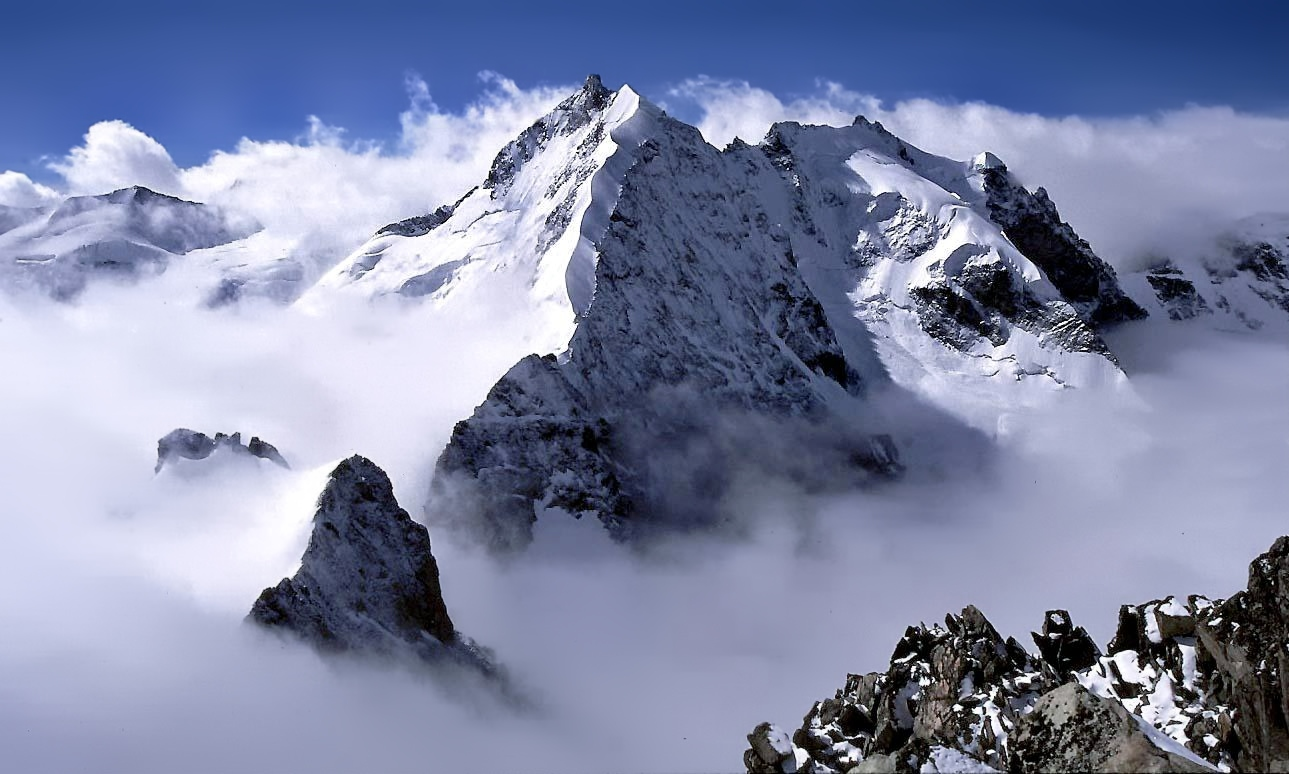
Nival zone: Piz Bernina from Piz Morteratsch

The area of the Grisons is 7,105.2 square kilometres (2,743.3 sq mi), 19.2% larger than the canton of Bern, the second largest canton. Only about a third of this is commonly regarded as productive land of which forests cover about a fifth of the total area. The canton is almost entirely mountainous and it is the most sparsely populated region of the country. In its southeastern part lies the only official Swiss National Park. In its northern part, the mountains were formed as part of the thrust fault that was in 2008 declared a geologic UNESCO World Heritage Site, under the name Swiss Tectonic Arena Sardona. Another Biosphere Reserve is the Biosfera Val Müstair adjacent to the Swiss National Park, while Ela Nature Park is one of the regionally supported parks.

The Grisons is sometimes included in the larger region of Eastern Switzerland, together with six other cantons. The Grisons shares border with numerous regions of Europe, reflecting its cultural diversity, and is the only canton adjacent to three different countries. On the national level it shares borders with four other cantons: Uri, Glarus, St. Gallen to the northwest (essentially across the Glarus Alps) and Ticino to the west (essentially across the Gotthard Massif and the Lepontine Alps but also at the level of the plain at Roveredo). On the international level, the canton shares borders with three countries: Liechtenstein to the north, the Austrian regions of Vorarlberg and Tyrol to the northeast and the Italian regions of Trentino-South Tyrol and Lombardy to the east and south.

== History ==
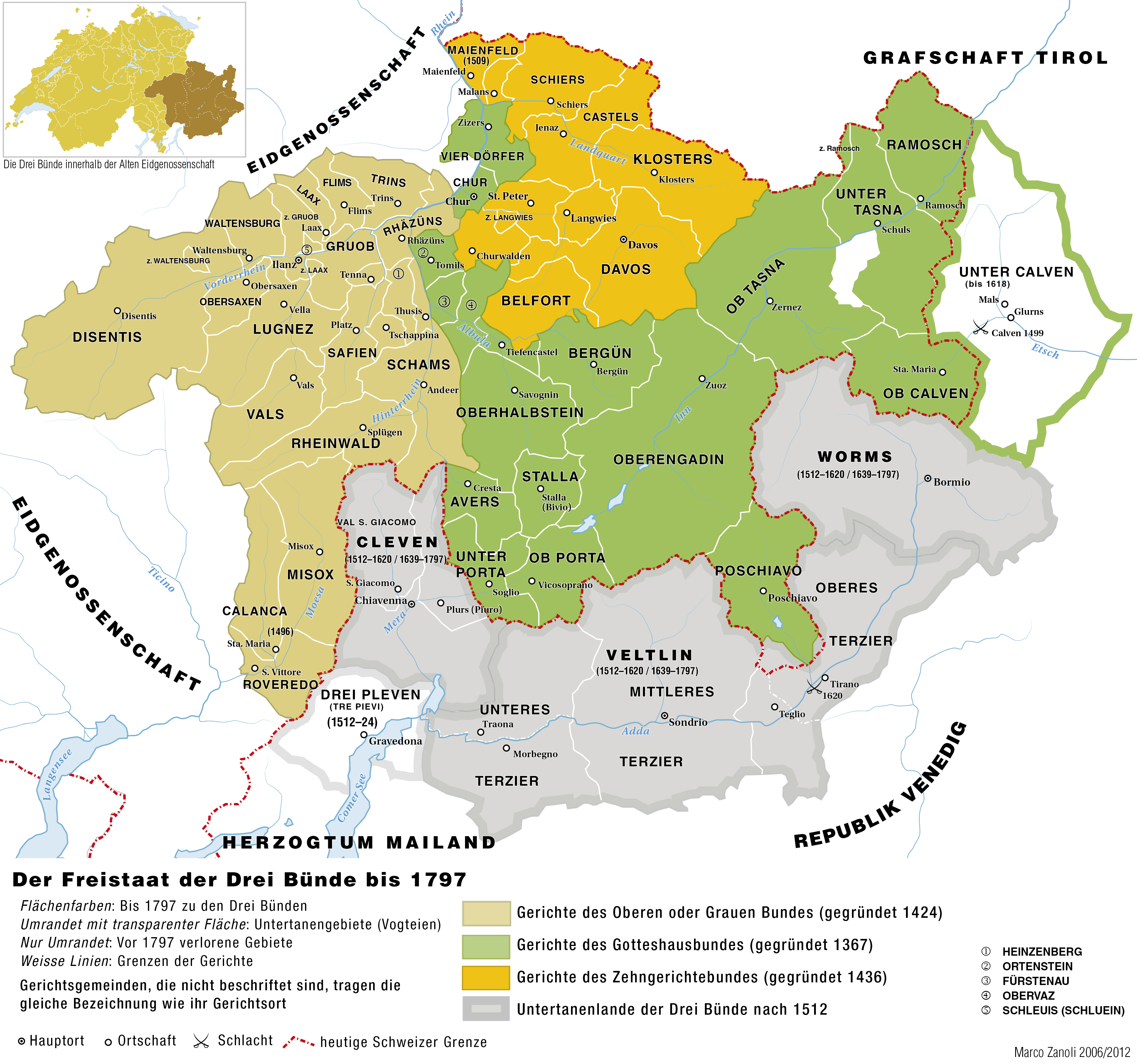
Map of the Three Leagues and surrounding lands

The deep Alpine valleys of the present-day Grisons were originally settled by the Raetians (Rhaeti). In Chur, archaeological evidence of settlement goes back as far as the Pfyn culture (3900–3500 BC), making the capital city of the Grisons one of the oldest settlements in Switzerland.

Most of the lands of the canton were once part of a Roman province called Raetia, which was established in 15 BC. The current capital of the Grisons, Chur, was known as Curia in Roman times. The area later was part of the lands of the diocese of Chur.

In 1367 the League of God's House (Cadi, Gottes Haus, Ca' di Dio) was founded to resist the rising power of the Bishop of Chur. This was followed by the establishment of the Grey League (Grauer Bund), sometimes called Oberbund, in 1395 in the Upper Rhine valley. The name Grey League is derived from the homespun grey clothes worn by the people and was used exclusively after 16 March 1424. The name of this league later gave its name to the canton of the Grisons. A third league was established in 1436 by the people of ten bailiwicks in the former Toggenburg countship, as the dynasty of Toggenburg had become extinct. The league was called League of the Ten Jurisdictions (Zehngerichtebund).

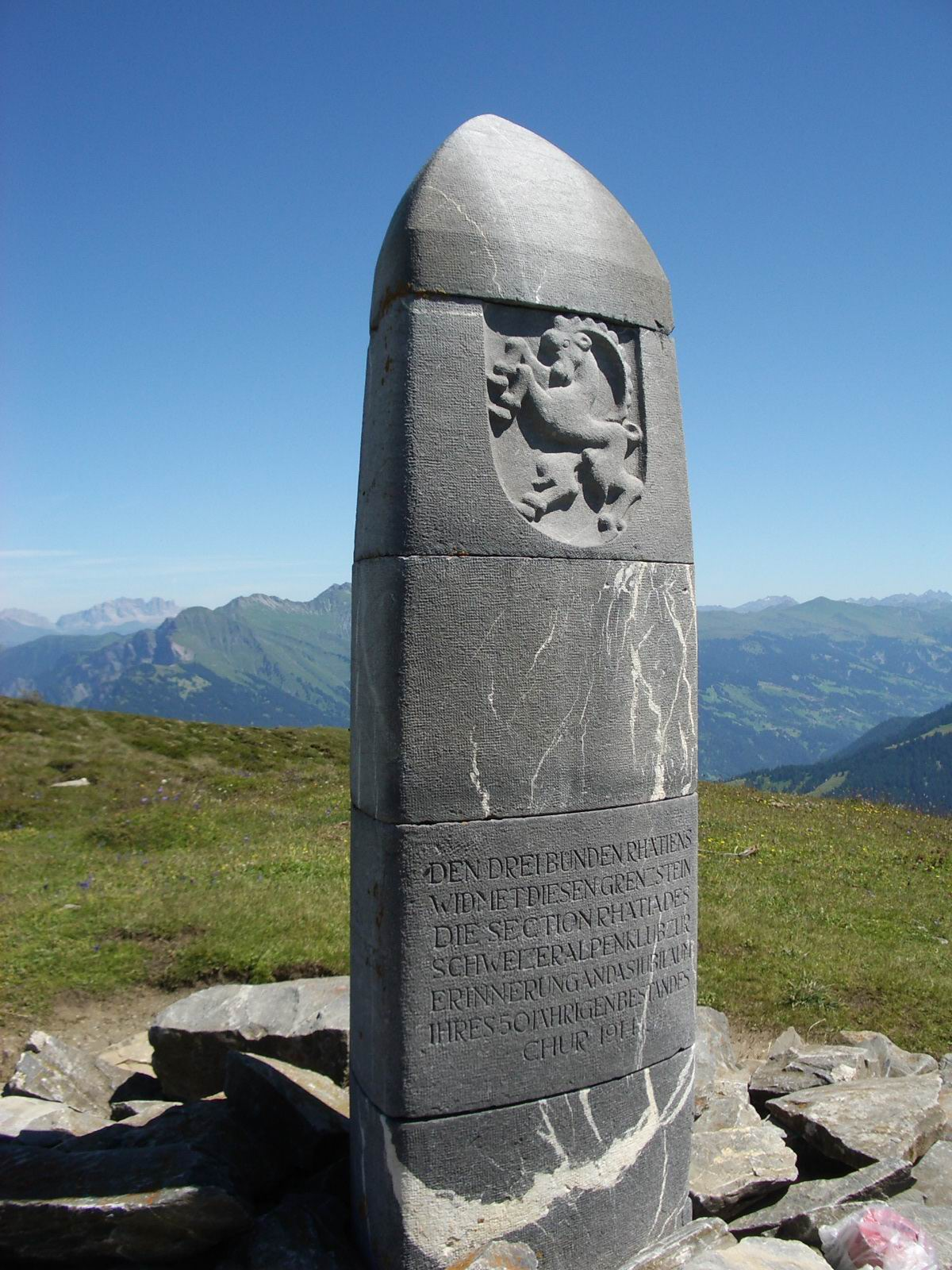
The Dreibündenstein monument, marking the former tripoint of the Three Leagues

The first step towards the canton of the Grisons was when the league of the Ten Jurisdictions allied with the League of God's House in 1450. In 1471 the two leagues allied with the Grey League. In 1497 and 1498 the Leagues allied with the Old Swiss Confederacy after the Habsburgs acquired the possessions of the extinct Toggenburg dynasty in 1496, siding with the Confederacy in the Swabian War three years later. The Habsburgs were defeated at Calven Gorge and Dornach, helping the Swiss Confederation and the allied leagues of the canton of the Grisons to be recognised. However the Three Leagues remained a loose association until the Bundesbrief of 23 September 1524.

The last traces of the Bishop of Chur's jurisdiction were abolished in 1526. The Musso war of 1520 drove the Three Leagues closer to the Swiss Confederacy.

Between 1618 and 1639 it became a battleground between competing factions during the Bündner Wirren. The Protestant party was supported by France and Venice, while the Catholic party was supported by the Habsburgs in Spain and Austria. Each side sought to gain control of the Grisons to gain control over the important alpine passes. In 1618, the young radical Jörg Jenatsch became a member of the court of 'clerical overseers' and a leader of the anti-Habsburg faction. He supervised the torture to death of the arch-priest Nicolò Rusca of Sondrio. In response, Giacomo Robustelli of the pro-Catholic Planta family, raised an army of rebels in the Valtellina. On the evening of 18/19 July 1620, a force of Valtellina rebels supported by Austrian and Italian troops marched into Tirano and began killing Protestants. When they finished in Tirano, they marched to Teglio, Sondrio and further down the valley killing every Protestant that they found. Between 500 and 600 people were killed on that night and in the following four days. The attack drove nearly all the Protestants out of the valley, prevented further Protestant incursions and took the Valtellina out of the Three Leagues.

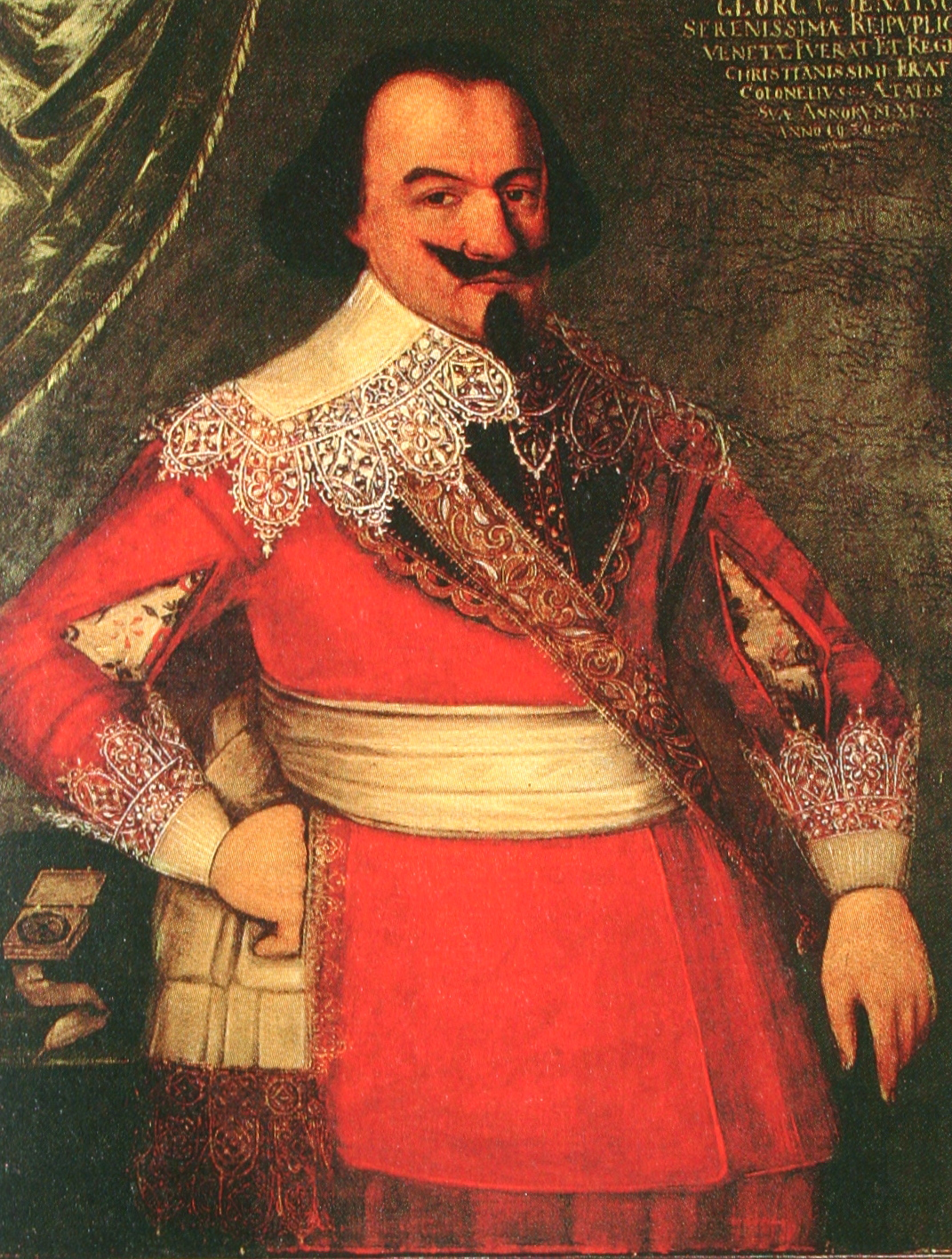
Jörg Jenatsch was a major and divisive figure during the Bündner Wirren (1618–1639).

In response, in February 1621, Jenatsch led a force of anti-Habsburg troops to attack Rietberg Castle, the home of a leader of the pro-Catholic faction, Pompeius Planta. They surprised Planta and according to legend he was killed by Jörg Jenatsch with an axe. The murder of Planta encouraged the Protestant faction and they assembled a poorly led and disorganized army to retake the Valtellina and other subject lands. However, the army fell apart before they could attack a single Catholic town. This Protestant invasion provided the Spanish and Austrians with an excuse to invade the Leagues. By the end of October, Spain and Austria had occupied all of the Grisons. The resulting peace treaty of January 1622, forced Grisons to cede the Müstair, the Lower Engadine and Prättigau valleys. The treaty also forbade the Protestant religion in these valleys. In response, in 1622, the Prättigau valley rebelled against the Austrians and drove them out of the valley. The Austrians invaded the valley twice more, attempting to reimpose the Catholic faith, in 1623–1624 and 1629–1631.

In 1623 the Leagues entered into an alliance with France, Savoy and Venice. Jürg Jenatsch and Ulysses von Salis used French money to hire an 8,000-man mercenary army and drive out the Austrians. The peace treaty of Monzon (5 March 1626) between France and Spain, confirmed the political and religious independence of the Valtellina. In 1627 the French withdrew from the Valtellina valley, which was then occupied by Papal troops. Starting in 1631 the League, under the French Duke Henri de Rohan, started to expel the Spaniards. However, Richelieu still did not want to hand the valley over to its residents. When it became clear that the French intended to remain permanently in the Leagues, but would not force the Valtellina to convert to Protestantism, Jürg Jenatsch (now a mercenary leader) converted in 1635 to the Catholic faith. In 1637, he rebelled and allied with Austria and Spain. His rebellion along with the rebellion of 31 other League officers forced the French to withdraw without a fight. On 24 January 1639, Jürg Jenatsch was killed during Carnival by an unknown attacker who was dressed as a bear. The attacker may have been a son of Pompeius Planta or an assassin hired by the local aristocracy. According to legend he was killed by the same axe that he used on Pompeius Planta. On 3 September 1639 the Leagues agreed with Spain to bring the Valtellina back under League sovereignty, but with the promise to respect the free exercise of the Catholic faith. Treaties with Austria in 1649 and 1652, brought the Müstair and Lower Engadine valleys back under the authority of the Three Leagues.

In 1798, the lands of the canton of the Grisons became part of the Helvetic Republic as the canton of Raetia except Valtellina, which was separated in 1797 for joining the Cisalpine Republic. It was later part of the Empire of Austria in 1814 before joining the Kingdom of Italy in 1859. With the Act of Mediation in 1803, Grisons became a canton of its historic "perpetual ally," Switzerland. The constitution of the canton dates from 1892. In the following century, there have been about 30 changes made to the constitution.

The arms of the three original leagues were combined into the modern cantonal coat of arms in 1933.

== Government ==
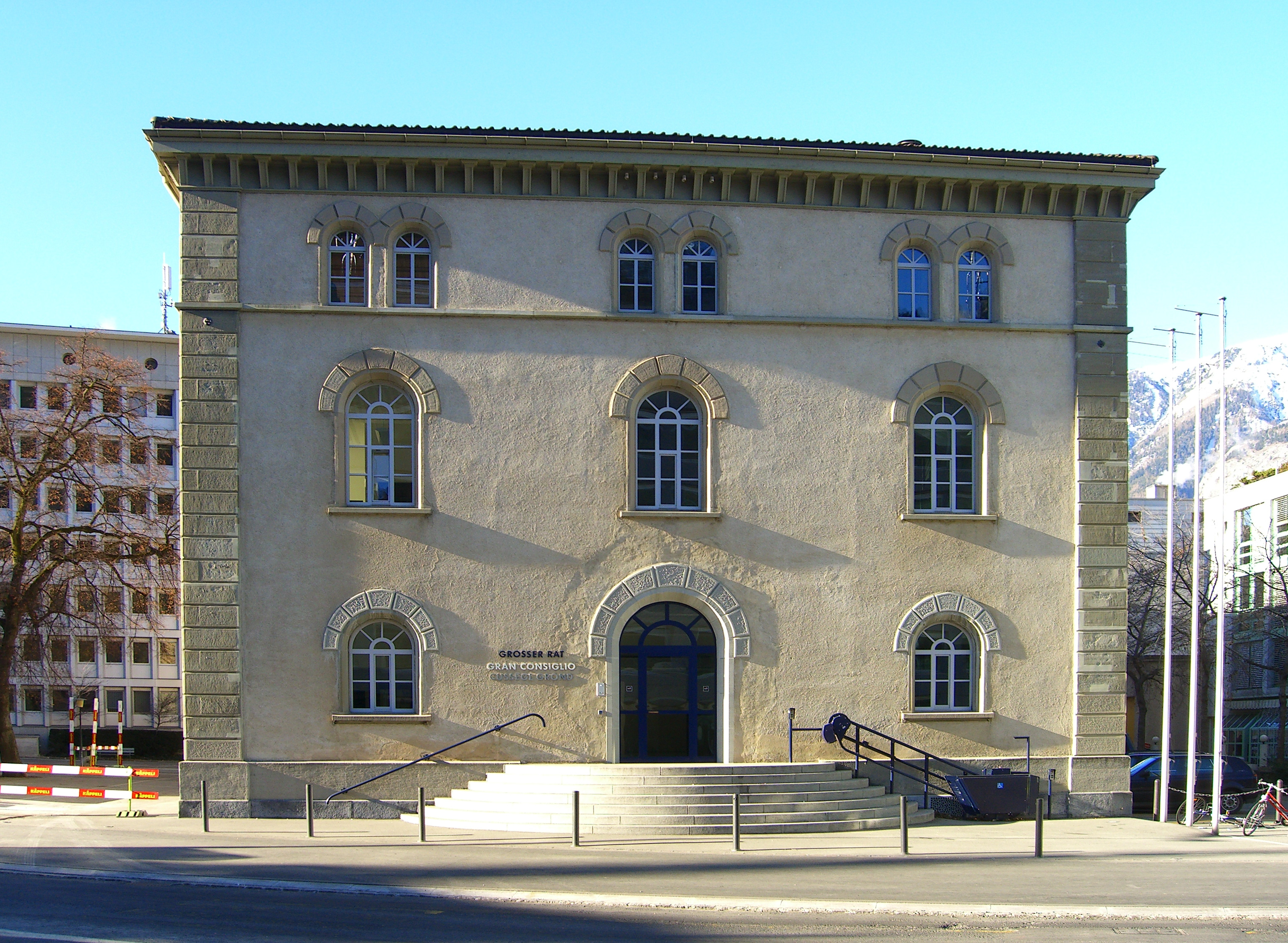
Grand Council building in Chur

The Grand Council (German: Grosser Rat; Italian: Gran Consiglio, Romansh: Cussegl Grond), the legislature of the canton, sits in Chur, the cantonal capital. Its 120 members, elected in 39 districts using a majority system, are in office for four years. The last district elections were in 2014. The cantonal government, exercising executive authority, is made up of five members, elected by the people for a term of four years and limited to three terms using a majority system.

The constitution of the Grisons, last revised on 14 September 2003, states in its preamble that the canton's purpose is to "safeguard freedom, peace, and human dignity, ensure democracy and the Rechtsstaat, promote prosperity and social justice and preserving a sane environment for the future generations, with the intention of promoting trilingualism and cultural variety and conserving them as part of our historical heritage".

The constitution allows for the enfranchisement of foreign residents at a municipal level, at discretion of the local governments. In 2009, the municipality of Bregaglia became the first in the canton to make use of this provision, granting voting rights to foreigners.

== Politics ==
=== Federal election results ===
Percentage of the total vote per party in the canton in the Federal Elections 1971–2015
Party	Ideology	1971	1975	1979	1983	1987	1991	1995	1999	2003	2007	2011	2015
FDP.The Liberals^{a}	Classical liberalism	14.8	18.1	22.9	20.1	18.3	18.1	16.5	15.1	15.8	19.1	11.9	13.3
CVP/PDC/PPD/PCD	Christian democracy	37.3	35.9	35.5	33.3	28.5	25.6	26.9	25.6	23.7	20.3	16.6	16.8
SP/PS	Social democracy	13.9	15.2	20.5	24.6	19.5	21.2	21.6	26.6	24.9	23.7	15.6	17.6
SVP/UDC	National conservatism	34.0	26.9	21.1	22.0	20.0	19.5	26.9	27.0	33.8	34.7	24.5	29.7
Ring of Independents	Social liberalism	* ^{b}	*	*	*	*	*	1.1	*	disbanded	disbanded	disbanded	disbanded
CSP/PCS	Christian left	*	*	*	*	*	6.9	*	*	*	*	*	*
GLP/PVL	Green liberalism	*	*	*	*	*	*	*	*	*	*	8.3	7.9
BDP/PBD	Conservatism	*	*	*	*	*	*	*	*	*	*	20.5	14.5
GPS/PES	Green politics	*	*	*	*	*	*	3.5	*	*	*	2.2	*
FGA	Feminist	*	*	*	*	6.0	4.3	1.9	*	*	*	*	*
SD/DS	Swiss nationalism	*	3.5	*	*	*	*	*	*	*	*	*	*
EDU/UDF	Christian right	*	*	*	*	*	*	*	*	1.9	1.6	0.5	*
Other		*	0.3	*	*	7.7	4.4	1.7	5.8	*	0.6	*	0.2
Voter participation %		56.7	49.6	45.9	39.9	39.5	37.9	36.7	40.6	39.1	41.9	45.1	46.0

^a FDP before 2009, FDP.The Liberals after 2009
^b "*" indicates that the party was not on the ballot in this canton.

== Political subdivisions ==
=== Regions ===
as of January 2017

- Albula with capital Tiefencastel
- Bernina with capital Poschiavo
- Engiadina Bassa/Val Müstair with capital Scuol
- Imboden with capital Domat/Ems
- Landquart with capital Igis
- Maloja with capital Samedan
- Moesa with capital Roveredo
- Plessur with capital Chur
- Prättigau/Davos with capital Davos
- Surselva with capital Ilanz
- Viamala Region with capital Thusis

=== Municipalities ===
There are 100 municipalities in the canton (as of January 2025).

== Demographics ==
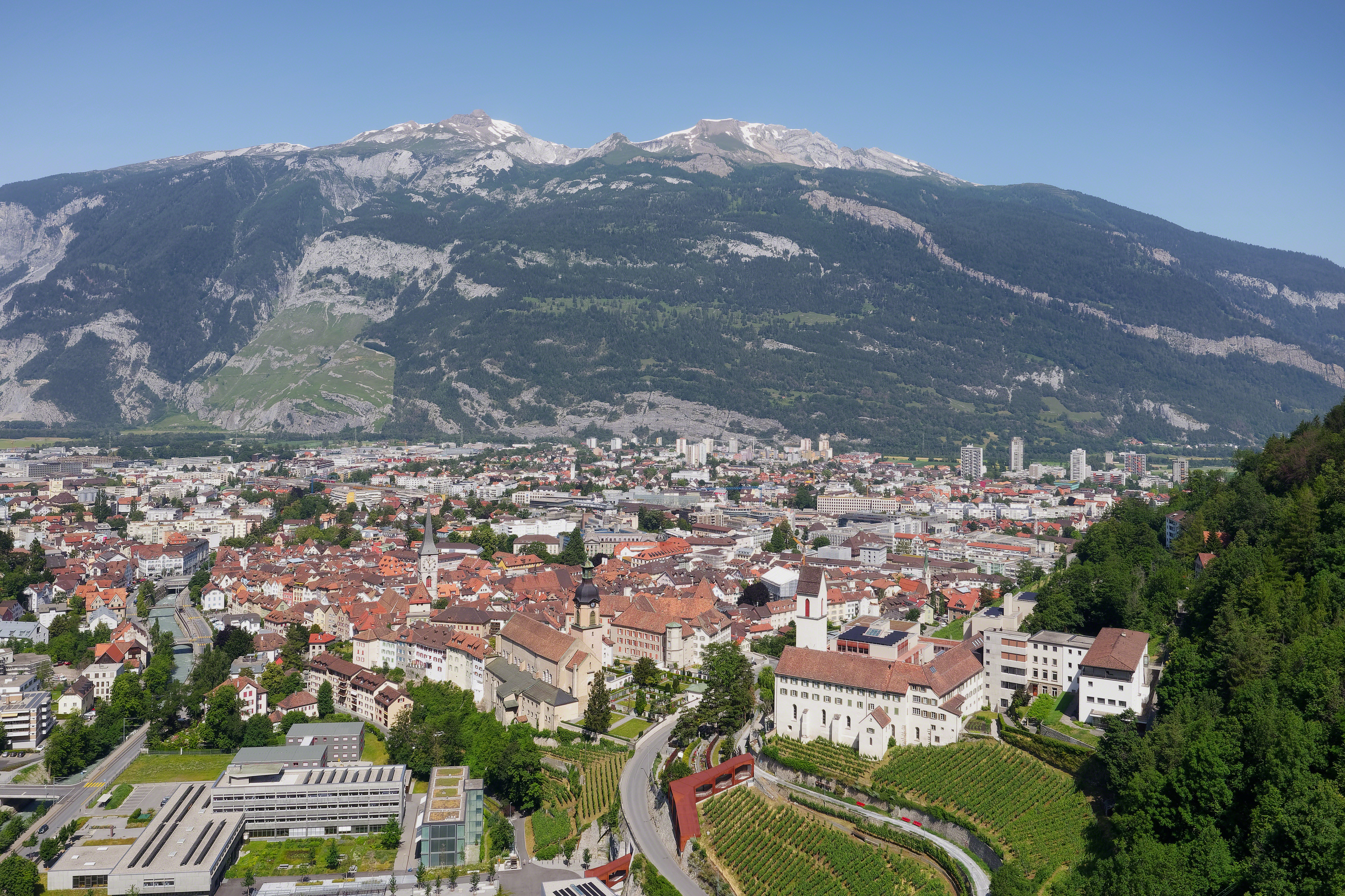
View of Chur, at the foot of the Calanda

The inhabitants of the Grisons are called Bündner or (rarely) Grisonians.

The population of the canton (as of 31 December 2020) is 200,096. As of 2007, the population included 28,008 foreigners, or about 14.84% of the total population. The main religions are Catholicism and Protestantism. Both are well represented in the canton, with Roman Catholics forming a slight plurality (47% Catholic to 41% Protestant).

=== Languages ===
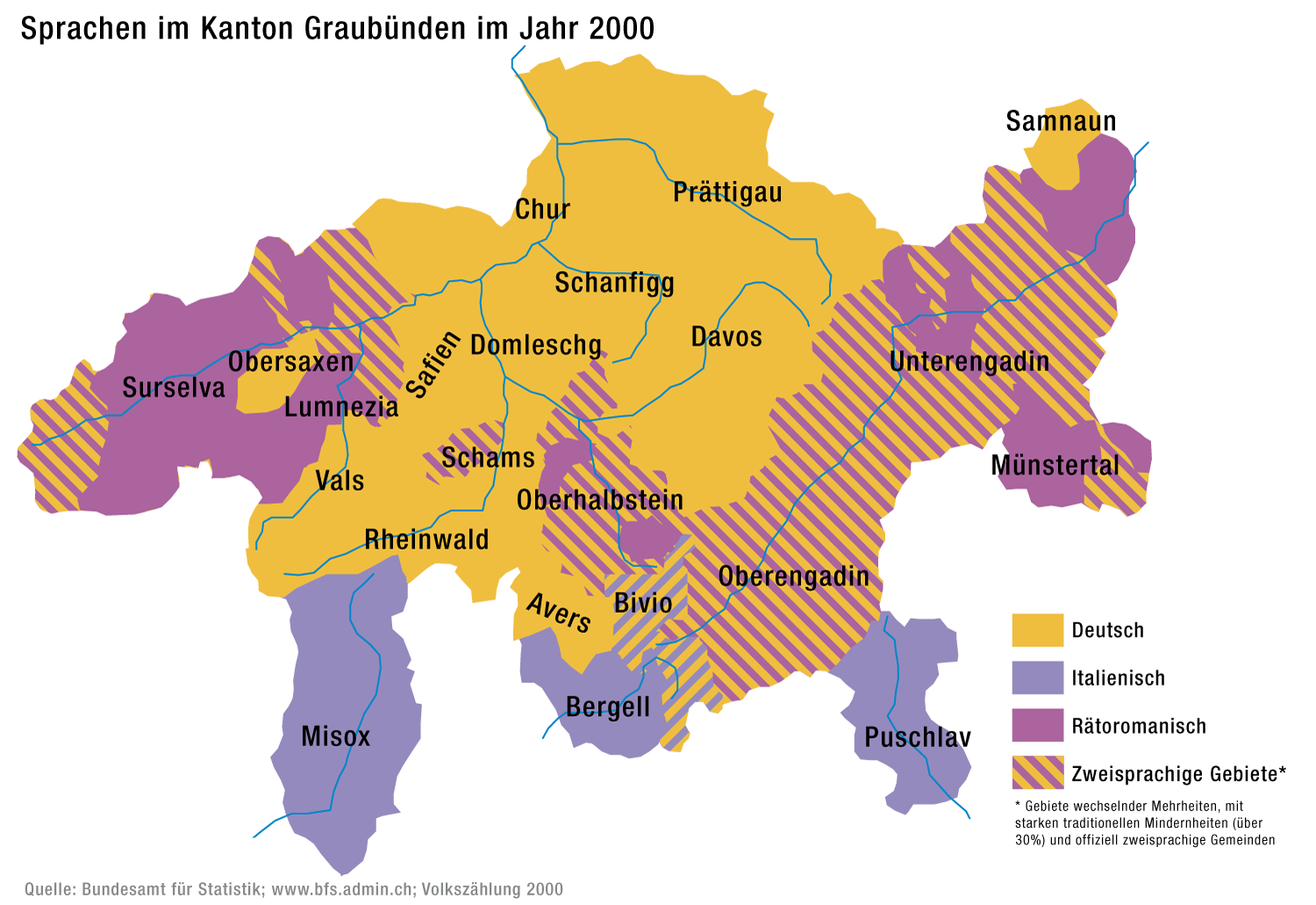
Geographical distribution of languages in the Grisons as of 2000

Original areas where the Romansh language was spoken from the Middle Ages to today

The Grisons is the only canton of Switzerland with three official languages: German (74.7%), Romansh (13.9%), and Italian (13.9%) with the remaining 13% speaking another language natively.

Languages in the Grisons 1803–2020
Year	Population	Romansh (%)	German (%)	Italian (%)
1803	73,200	36,700 (~50%)	26,500 (~36%)	10,000 (~14%)
1850	89,895	42,439 (47.2%)	35,509 (39.5%)	11,956 (13.3%)
1880	93,864	37,794 (39.8%)	43,664 (46.0%)	12,976 (13.7%)
1900	104,520	36,472 (34.9%)	48,762 (46.7%)	17,539 (16.8%)
1920	119,854	39,127 (32.7%)	61,379 (51.2%)	17,674 (14.8%)
1941	128,247	40,187 (31.3%)	70,421 (54.9%)	16,438 (12.8%)
1950	137,100	40,109 (29.3%)	77,096 (56.2%)	18,079 (13.2%)
1960	147,458	38,414 (26.1%)	83,544 (56.7%)	23,682 (16.1%)
1970	162,086	37,878 (23.4%)	93,359 (57.6%)	25,575 (15.8%)
1980	164,641	36,017 (21.9%)	98,645 (59.9%)	22,199 (13.5%)
2000	187,058	27,038 (14.5%)	127,755 (68.3%)	19,106 (10.2%)
2012	191,612	27,955 (15.2%)	143,015 (74.6%)	23,506 (12.0%)
2015	193,662	29,826 (15.4%)	142,378 (73.5%)	25,033 (12.9%)
2020	200,096	27,813 (13.9%)	149,471 (74.7%)	27,813 (13.9%)

More speakers of the Romansh language live in the Grisons than in any other canton, although it has become a minority language there. Since the late Middle Ages the Romansh language has greatly reduced (by more than half the original territory, that included Liechtenstein and sections of western Austria) the area where it is spoken by the majority of the population.

Romansh consists of five dialect groups, each with its own written language: Sursilvan, Vallader, Puter, Surmiran and Sutsilvan. There also exists a common written language called Rumantsch Grischun. Romansh has been recognized as one of four "national languages" by the Swiss Federal Constitution since 1938. It was declared an "official language" of the Confederation in 1996, meaning that Romansh speakers may use Romansh for correspondence with the federal government and expect to receive a response in Rumantsch Grischun. Romansh has official language status at the canton level. Municipalities in turn are free to specify their own official languages.

== Economy ==
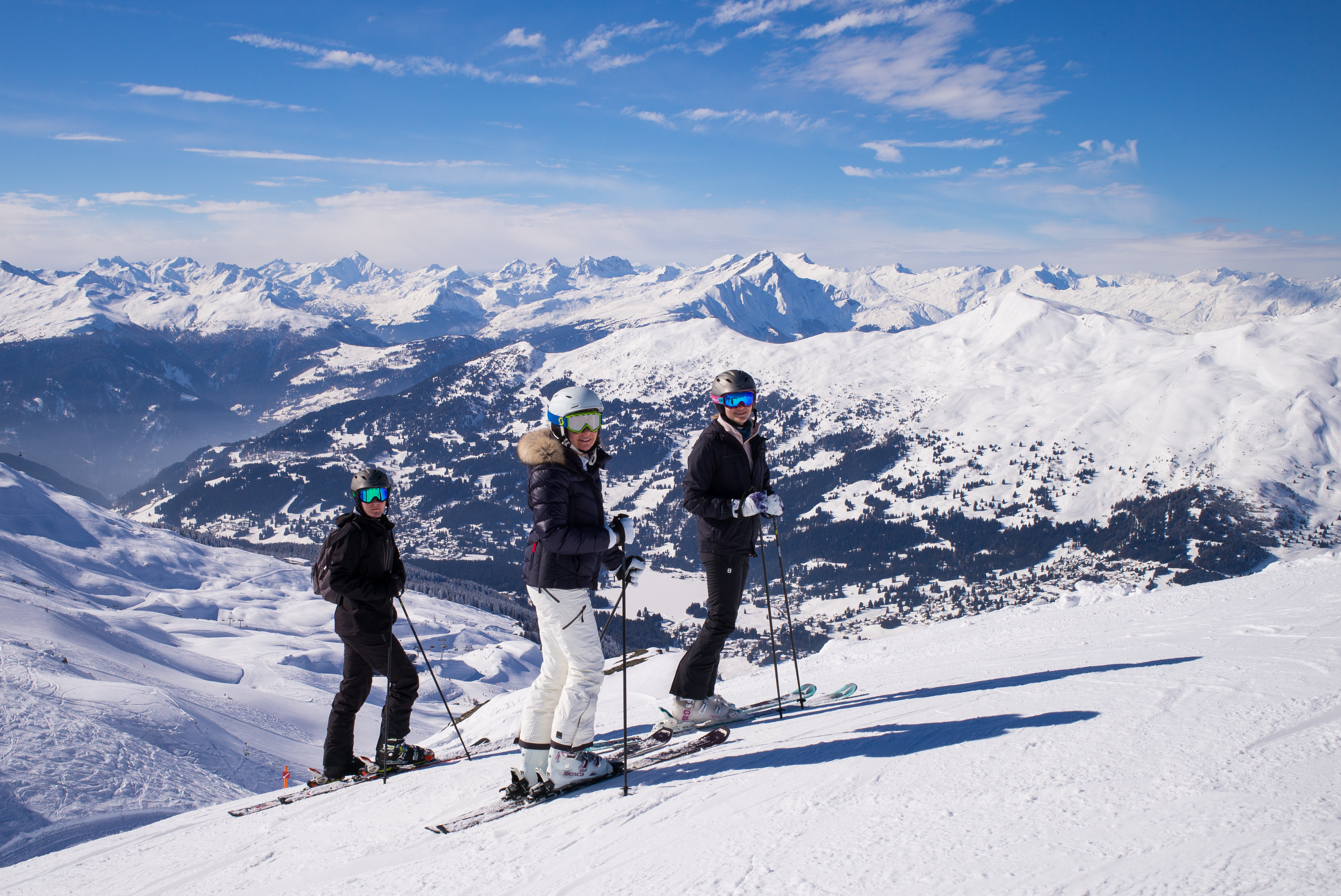
Skiers above Lenzerheide

Agriculture is still essential to keep remote valleys inhabited and cultivated, differing it from sheer wilderness. Agriculture is therefore supported by subsidies by the authorities both national and regional. Eight per cent of the population work in agriculture and forestry, where 50 per cent of the production is certified as organic. Agriculture includes forests and mountain pasturage in summer, particularly of cows, sheep and goats. Since wolf and bear have returned, the use of Maremma Sheepdogs is not unusual. Although mountain pastures are predominant, there is also wine production in the Rhine Valley, particularly in Fläsch, Maienfeld, Jenins and Malans. This area is referred to as the Bündner Herschaft. In the southern valleys of Mesolcina and Val Poschiavo there is corn (maize) and chestnut farming, allowed by the milder climate. In the Mesolcina, olive trees are also grown.

24 per cent of the workforce are employed in industry whereas 68 per cent work in the service industry. The most industrialized region is naturally that of Chur. Ems-Chemie is based in Domat/Ems and is a major employer in the area.

The tourism industry is a major player and reaches a remarkable 14 per cent of the GDP. Tourism is concentrated around the towns of Davos, Klosters, Lenzerheide, Arosa, Flims, St. Moritz and Pontresina, which have large ski areas. There are, however, a great number of other tourist resorts in the canton, divided by the official tourist board for winter sports for example into categories "Top - Large - Small and beautiful". St. Moritz is one of the oldest winter sport resorts, being popular in winter since 1864. The following year, Davos also saw its first tourists in winter. St. Moritz hosted the 1928 Winter Olympics and the 1948 Winter Olympics. Summer tourism is also an important source of revenue. Trekking, mountaineering, and mountain biking are some of the main activities. Business tourism is also a source of revenue, notably in Davos, where the World Economic Forum meetings are traditionally organised.

== Transport ==
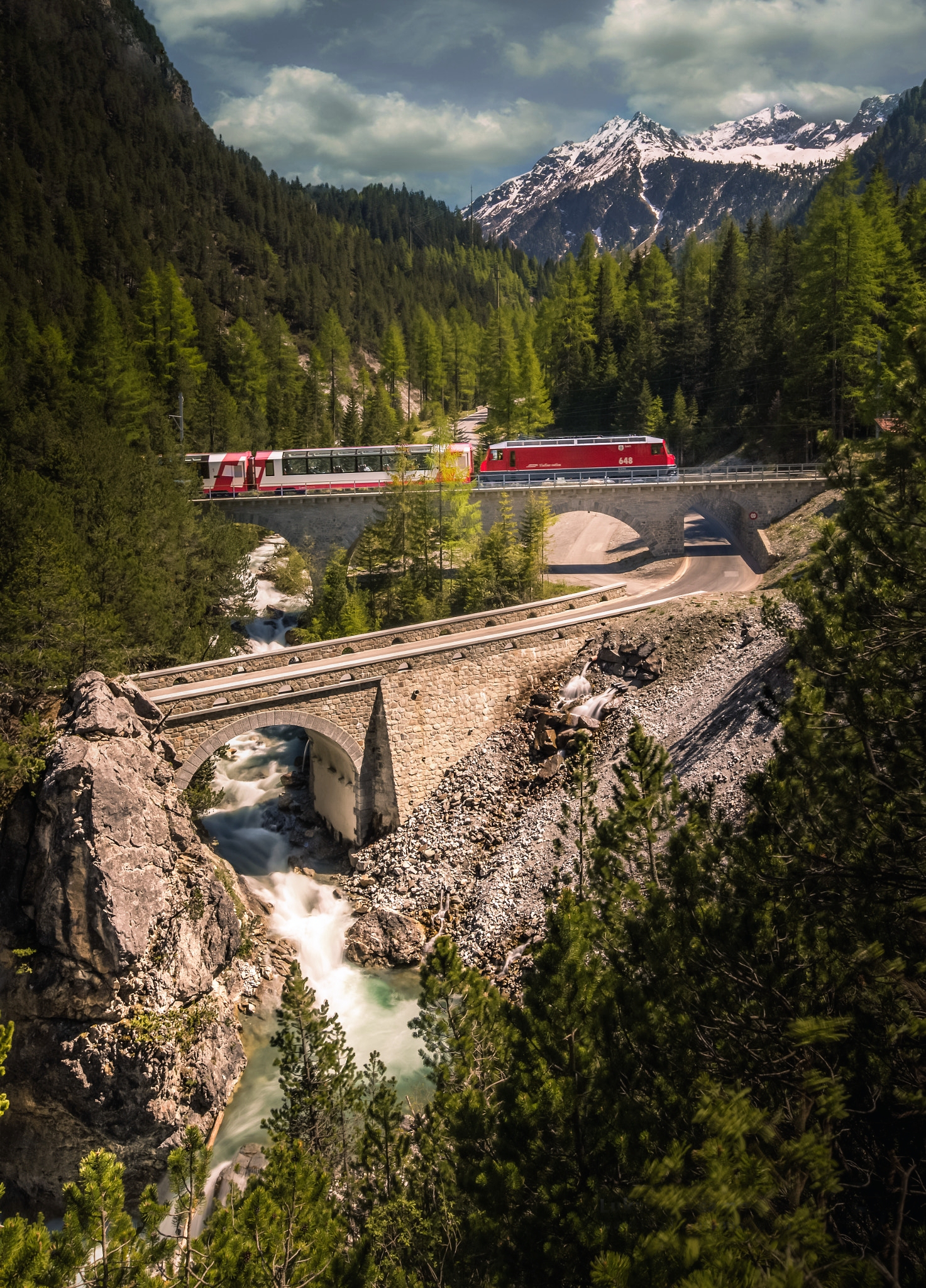
Glacier Express climbing the Albula Railway. Winding mountain roads and railways have become an integral part of the landscape.

As the canton extends on both sides of the great Alpine barrier, many important mountain passes are found there, particularly on the north-south axis. Transport has always been an important issue in the area; cart tracks from the Roman era were found on Julier Pass and Septimer Pass was rebuilt for cart use in 1387 and, although it later became unimportant, it is still in its 1800 form (for hikers only). Corniche paths were necessary for long stretches, and gorges such as the Viamala gave construction problems for any kind of transport. The first real roads of 3.7 m (4 yd) width were built across the Alps from around 1816, one of which is still in a very good historical condition, as this connection across Splügen Pass lost its importance after the opening of rail tunnels crossing the alps. The last valley to be connected to the road system in the Grisons was Avers, whose remote hamlet of Juf was only reached in 1897.

Before the 20th century, the large road network of the Grisons were only used by pedestrians, horse-drawn carts and carriages. The advent of the automobile was met with suspicion and fear by the majority of the population. On August 17, 1900, the Small Council of Grisons issued the Grisons automobile ban, which banned all motorized vehicles from driving on cantonal roads and was in effect until 1925. After its enactment, it was attempted to soften or rescind the ban several times, but those attempts were stopped in referendums. A total of nine cantonal referendums concerning the ban were held, the last of which resulted in the ban being lifted on June 21, 1925. After the automobile ban was lifted, the number of motor vehicles in the Grisons grew sharply, although the development of the road network was slow. In the 1960s, just one third of the roads in the canton of Grisons were paved, compared to 76% in the rest of Switzerland. In 2025, the Grisons had a high level of motorization with 618 passenger cars per 1,000 inhabitants (Swiss average: 535 passenger cars).

In 1967, San Bernardino road tunnel opened. Built to host tourism traffic, it is also used by heavy trucks nowadays, although it is not really suitable for them because of its ascent gradients. Most other passes have lost their importance for goods transport nowadays.

Unlike Valais and Ticino, the Grisons does not benefit from major railway axes across the Alps such as the Lötschberg and Gotthard. As a consequence, the only standard-gauge railway in the canton is that of the Rhine Valley, ending at Chur station. Conversely, the latter has become a major railway station and a transport hub of the canton since the construction of the Rhaetian Railway, which links most regions of the canton from the Rhine Valley.

Huge efforts ensure public transport to (nearly) every settlement by an integrated timetable of different transport companies. Even Juf, inhabited by some 30 people only but holding a European record, is reached five times a day by public transport. The two main transport companies are PostBus, the national post bus company, and the Rhaetian Railway, essentially owned by the cantonal government. The latter uses the largest narrow-gauge railway network in Switzerland and serves most regions of the canton, with branches towards Central Switzerland and Italy. This network is notably travelled by two of the longest-distance trains of Switzerland: the Glacier Express and the Bernina Express. The Swiss Federal Railways extend only a few kilometres into the canton, from Maienfeld, and serve essentially Landquart and Chur, where passengers transfer to the Rhaetian Railway and a large number of PostBus routes. The Albula Line became a UNESCO world heritage site, as did the Bernina Railway, the highest and only railway to cross the Alps without the use of a tunnel at the pass. In winter some of the road passes are closed, whereas several high mountain passes such as the Julier, Bernina and Lukmanier are kept open all winter (subject to restrictions). Being the highest-elevated state in Switzerland, the Grisons hosts huge alpine areas that are not accessible by any means of transport but have to be walked to. A large number of cable transport facilities provide easy access to some of the mountains of the Grisons, the highest being on Piz Corvatsch.

The Engadin valley has its own airport, Samedan Airport. It is the highest airport in Switzerland. However, there are no scheduled flights to and from the airport. Generally, residents in the Grisons would also use Zurich Airport, and Milan's Malpensa Airport, Linate Airport and Bergamo Airport to fly other domestic and international destinations.

== Culture ==
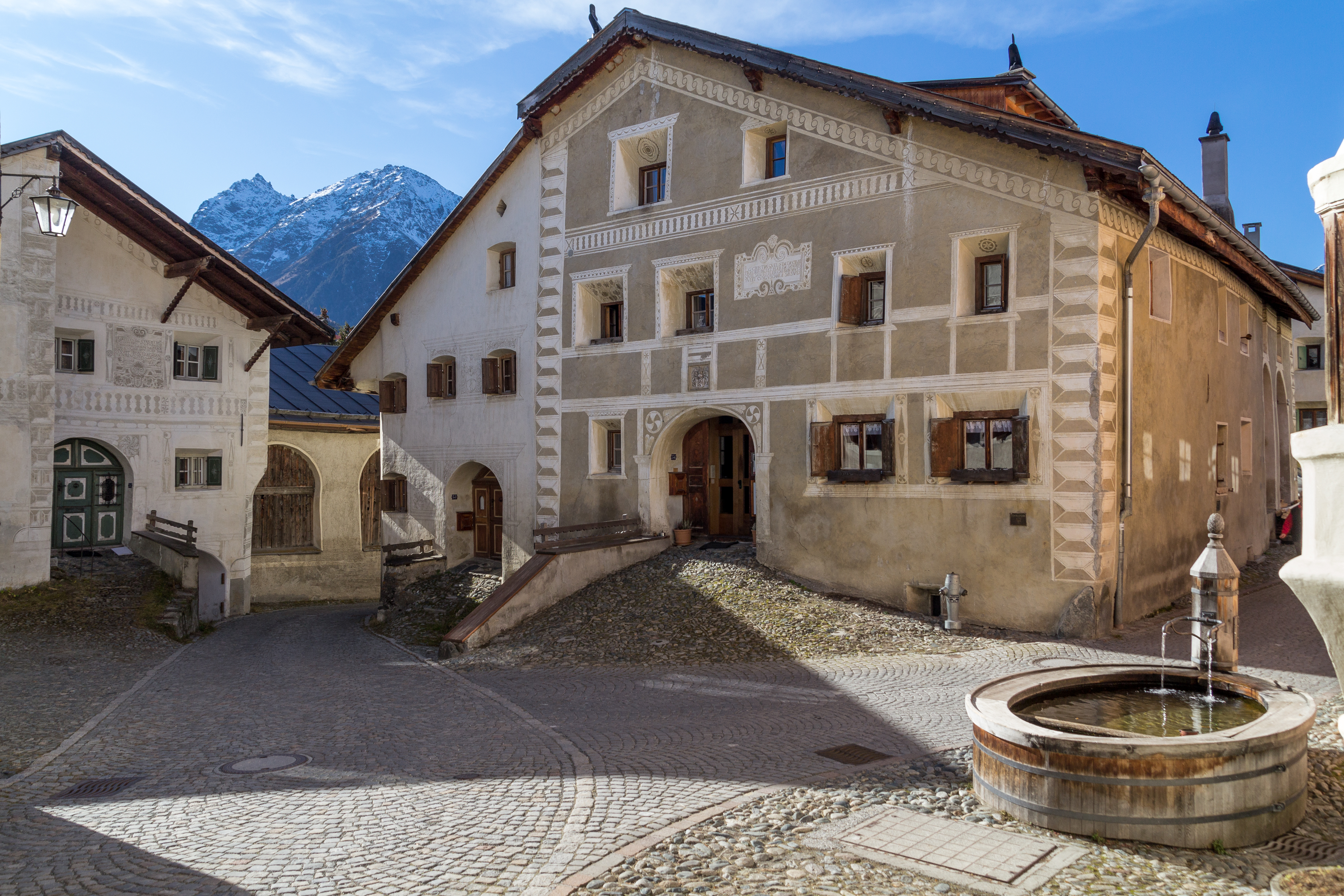
Painted houses in Guarda

The Grisons is culturally the most diverse region of Switzerland. Its common denominator, however, is a strong mountain culture marked by life in isolated rural communities, notably depicted in Johanna Spyri's Heidi. Traditional customs include Alpine transhumance in spring and autumn, and the Chalandamarz at the end of winter.

The canton has a large concentration of medieval castles (and ruins). The most notable, in the Engadin, is that of Tarasp, guarding the Inn valley. Many ruins and castles are found in the Domleschg area. Close by lies the church of Zillis, where 1130/40 a famous romanesque illustrated ceiling was added which is now treated as national heritage. Three World Heritage Sites are located in the canton: the Benedictine Convent of Saint John, the Swiss Tectonic Arena Sardona and the Rhaetian Railway in the Albula and Bernina Landscapes.

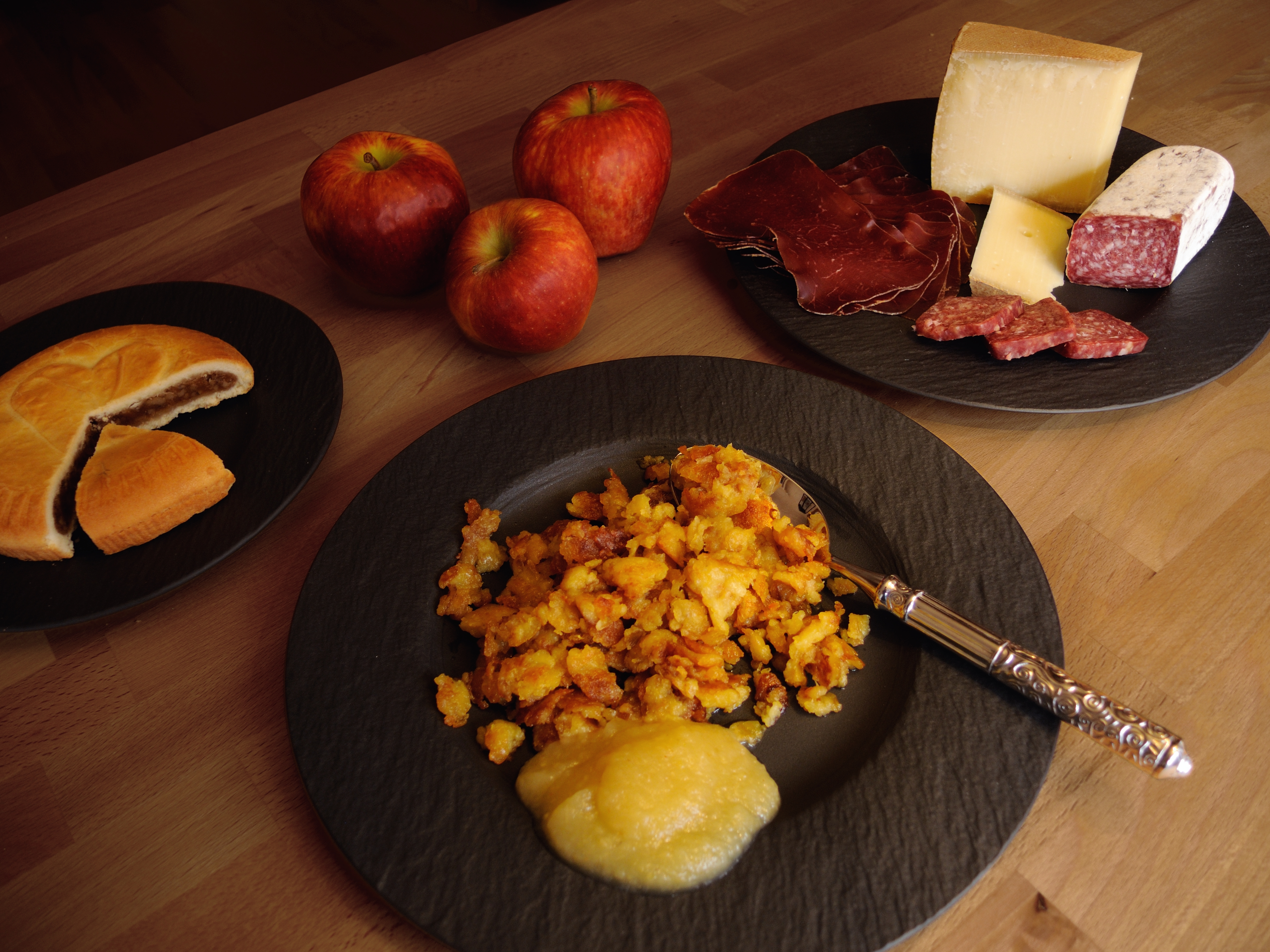
A dish of Maluns accompanied by various products of the Grisons

The gastronomy of the Grisons is mostly known for a dried-beef delicacy called Bündnerfleisch, often simply referred to as Grisons Meat. Other meat specialities include dried sausages (especially Salsiz, made of various meats), speck and ham. Cheeses produced in the Grisons are also numerous. Among notable dishes are the Capuns, predominantly made in the western part of the Grisons. Capuns consist of hearty dumplings with pieces of meat wrapped in chard leaves, then gratinated in oven with cheese and cream. The Maluns are another well-known dish of the Grisons. They are made of boiled potatoes mixed with flour, then fried in butter. Maluns are typically served with a compote of apples and various other local products such as cheeses and meat specialities. The Pizzoccheri are another dish, essentially eaten in the valley of Poschiavo. They consist of buckwheat noodles, cooked with potatoes, vegetables and cheese. The emblematic dessert of the Grisons is the Bündner Nusstorte. It is essentially a shortcrust pastry filled with a mix of caramelized walnuts and honey. Another similar pastry, but containing chestnuts instead, the Torta di Castagne, is made in the southern valleys, especially in the Val Bregaglia.

Wines are essentially produced in the Bündner Herrschaft. In the vineyards between Fläsch and Malans, 42 types of vines are found, Pinot Noir being the most popular. Wines are also naturally produced in the southern valleys but in smaller quantities. The valley of the Mesolcina is contiguous with the Ticino wine region and that of Poschiavo is contiguous with the Valtellina wine region. Numerous breweries can be found in the canton as well. The largest, located at Chur, is Calanda Bräu.

Radiotelevisiun Svizra Rumantscha is the Romansh-speaking division of the Swiss Broadcasting Corporation and focuses on the Grisons. Die Südostschweiz (in German) and La Quotidiana (Romansh) are some of the most important written media of the region.

== Nature ==
The Grisons successfully reintroduced ibex in the early 20th century after it had all but died out from the Alps, except for an area in the Aosta Valley in Italy, Parco Nazionale Gran Paradiso. Similarly, it reintroduced the bearded vulture and lynx in the 21st century, which had been extinguished, though the lynx remains rare.

== See also ==
- Swiss Alps
- Three Leagues
