= Belfort Castle (Graubünden) =

Ruined castle in Switzerland

- Burgruine Belfort
- Brienz/Brinzauls
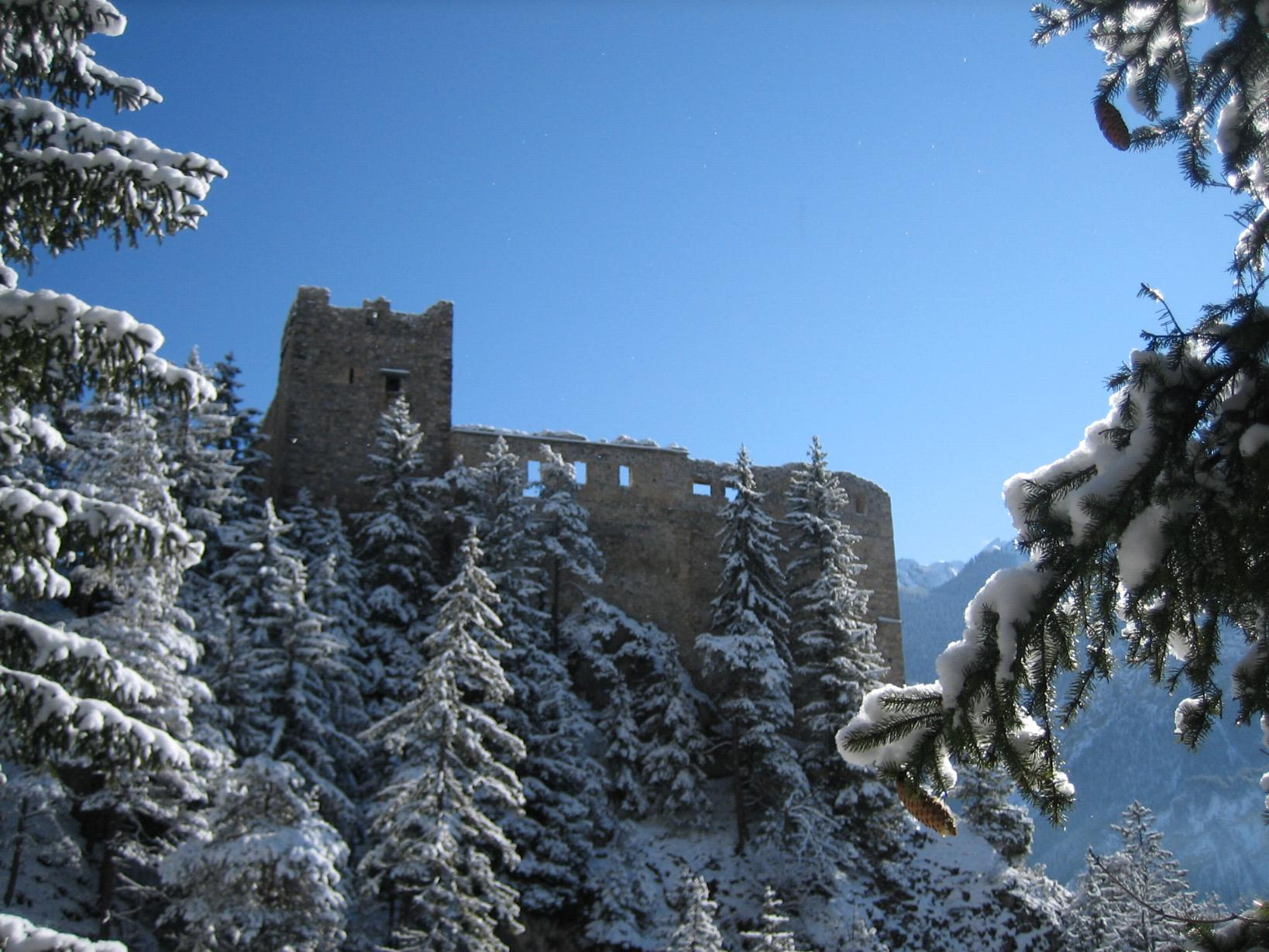
- Belfort Castle

Site information
- Owner: Canton of Graubünden
- Open to the public: yes
- Condition: ruined

Location
- Coordinates: 46.671151°N 9.610291°E

Site history
- Built: 1222-31
- Built by: Lords of Vaz (von Vatz)
- Materials: stone
- Demolished: 1499
- Battles/wars: Swabian War, 1499

Swiss Cultural Property of National Significance

Belfort Castle is a ruined castle in the municipality of Brienz/Brinzauls of the Canton of Graubünden in Switzerland. It is a Swiss heritage site of national significance.

== History ==
The castle was built in two parts, an upper and a lower castle, on a rocky ridge east of Brienz/Brinzauls. The first castle on the site probably dates to around 1200. In 1222 the castle was first mentioned as the home of the Lords of Vaz. Some parts of the castle have been dated by dendrochronology to 1228-31. The original upper castle consisted of a gatehouse and three story main tower on the north wall. In 1240 the castle was expanded. A small residence was added to the west wall, the main tower gained an additional story and the large south residence was added. The lower castle was added as well at this time, but was mostly used for protection not as a residence.

During the late 13th century Walter Vatz von Vaz allied himself with the Habsburgs against the Bishop of Chur and other local nobles. In 1287 a representative of the Bishop's, Walter Caramamma, was killed at Belfort. In 1332 another representative of the Bishop, Ulrich von Marmels, was executed at the castle, probably after being captured in a battle near Filisur. When the last of the male line, Donat von Vaz, died in 1337 Count Friedrich V von Toggenburg inherited the castle. Under the Toggenburgs the area was administered and the castle was probably occupied by a vogt.

When Frederick VII von Toggenburg died in 1436, the Belfort lands declared themselves free and joined the League of the Ten Jurisdictions. Several claimants fought legal battles to try to get their claims to Belfort recognized. In 1439, it was granted to Wilhelm von Montfort-Tettnang and Heinrich von Sax-Misox who together appointed a bailiff to occupy the castle and administer the lands. In 1466 the Montfort-Tettnang family sold their interest in the area to Sigmund of Austria. However, the residents of the area refused to acknowledge Austrian authority and in 1471 he was forced to sell his interest to the Matsch family. Six years later, in 1477, the Austrian Duke bought Belfort from the Matschs, triggering another round of protests and rebellion. In 1475 it is recorded that the castle was garrisoned with the bailiff and two mercenaries. In 1490, in an attempt to fortify the castle, the walls were raised.

In 1499, during the Swabian War the castle was stormed and burned.

== Castle site ==
Aerial recording of Belfort Castle

The upper castle is a rough pentagon built around a central courtyard with a round cistern. The old gate and gatehouse were built on the north side of the complex, with a large main tower grafted on the western side of the gatehouse. The main tower has walls that were up to 2.3 m (7.5 ft) thick. The northern gate was eventually closed and a new gate added on the eastern side. A large residence building formed the entire south end of the castle. The castle cistern went 5 m (16 ft) deep into the rock. Portions of the outer walls, a main tower, a five-story tall residential wing and a gate house are still standing. The lower castle stretched south along the ridge. It consisted of lower walls running along the east and west edges of the ridge and larger wall on the southern edge. A steep stairway carved into the rock connected the two fortifications. The northern, upper ruins were repaired and reinforced in 1935-36. The entire site was cleaned and repaired in 2002.

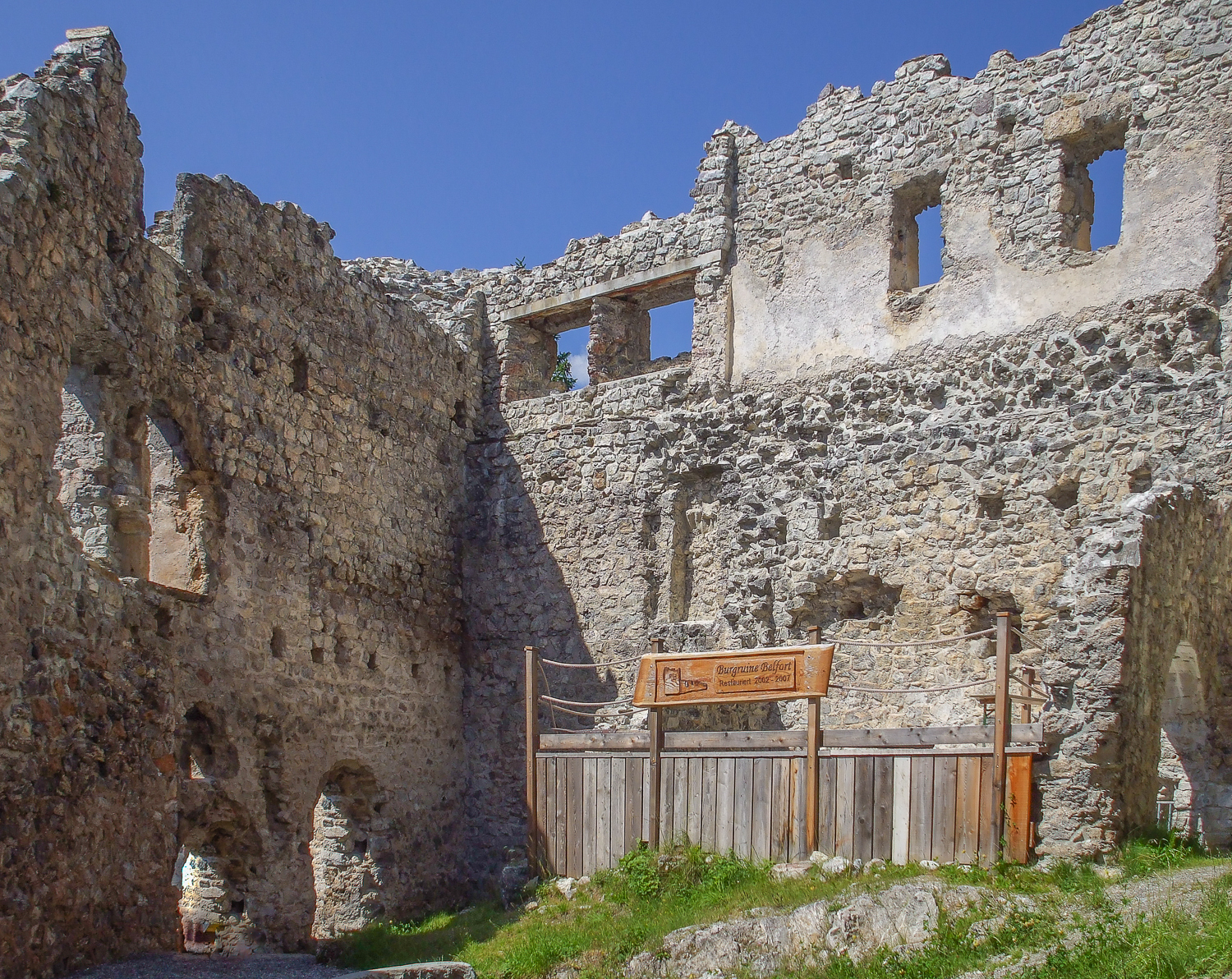
Inside Belfort castle

== See also ==
- List of castles in Switzerland
