= Canton of Raetia =

Coordinates: 46°45′N 9°30′E

Canton of Raetia Kanton Rätien (de) Canton Rezia (it)
- Canton of the Helvetic Republic
- 1798–1803
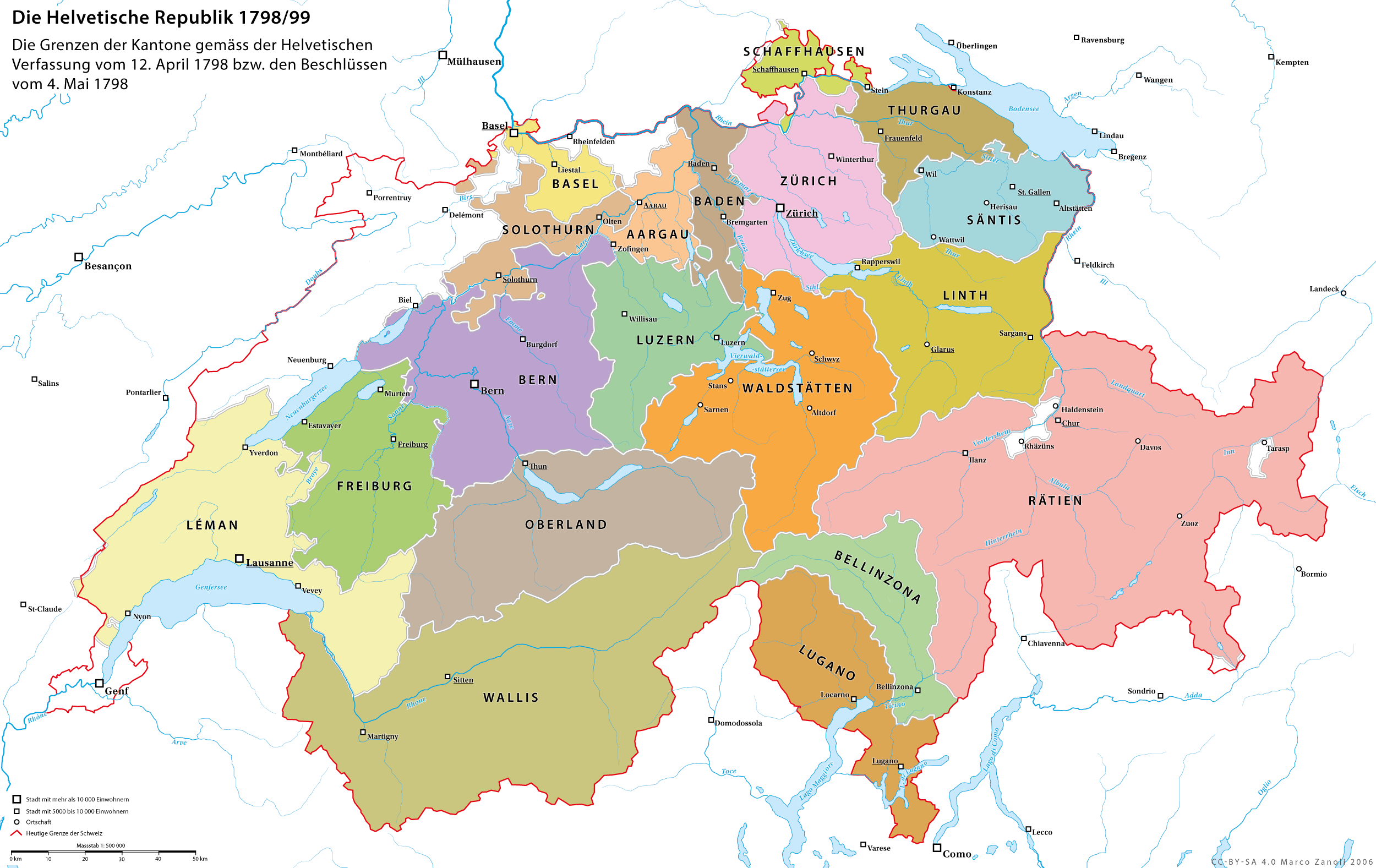
- The Helvetic Republic, as at the constitution of 12 April 1798, showing the canton of Raetia in dark pink at the eastern edge. The grey hatched area to Raetia's south is Chiavenna, Valtellina and Bormio, now the Italian province of Sondrio, annexed to the Cisalpine Republic in 1797.
- Capital: Chur
- History
  - Cisalpine Rep. established: June 29, 1797
  - Chiavenna, Valtellina and Bormio annexed to Cisalpine Republic: October 10 1798
  - Helv. Rep. proclaimed: April 12, 1798
  - Canton established: April 21, 1799
  - Helv. Rep. disestablished: 19 February 1803
Preceded by	Succeeded by
Three Leagues	Grisons / Graubünden

The Canton of Raetia was the name of a canton of the Helvetic Republic from 1798 to 1803, corresponding to modern Graubünden and composed of the Free State of the Three Leagues; it was named for ancient Raetia. Until 1799, the canton was administered by the central government of the Helvetic Republic.

The districts of Chiavenna, Valtellina and Bormio, previously dependencies of the Leagues, were never a part of the canton, having permanently been detached from the Leagues after Revolutionary France fomented revolt there, leading them to be annexed to the Cisalpine Republic on October 10, 1797. The districts subsequently joined the Austrian client kingdom of Lombardy–Venetia after the Congress of Vienna and eventually become the Italian province of Sondrio. The town of Campione, an imperial fief into the Landvogtei of Lugano at the same time, joined Lombardy leading to its current position as an Italian enclave within Ticino.

With the Napoleonic Act of Mediation in 1803, the canton was reestablished as Grisons, finally incorporating the Three Leagues into a decentralized and federal Switzerland.
