= Planta (surname) =

Planta is a surname of Swiss origin. Notable people with the surname include:

- Albert Planta (1868–1952), Canadian senator and financial agent
- Claudio von Planta (born 1962), Swiss cameraman
- Andrew Planta (1717–1773), Swiss pastor and librarian of the British Museum
- Elizabeth Planta (1740/41–1823), governess of Mary Bowes, Countess of Strathmore and Kinghorne and her children, daughter of Andrew Planta
- Joseph Planta (librarian) (1744–1827), Swiss Principal Librarian of the British Museum, son of Andrew
- Frederica Planta (1750–1778), governess and English teacher for the children of George III and Queen Charlotte of Great Britain, daughter of Andrew
- Anna Elizabeth "Eliza" Planta (1757–1815), governess of Mary Bowes' children and later of Catherine Shuvalova's daughter Alexandra, daughter of Andrew
- Sir Joseph Planta (1787–1847), British diplomat and politician, son of Joseph
- Thomas Planta (fl. 1356–1386), knight and Ammann of the Upper Engadine
- Conrad von Planta (fl. 1492–1517), Grisons politician, first governor of the Valtellina
- Johann von Planta (c. 1500–1572), Grisons jurist and politician
- Thomas Planta (1520–1565), bishop of Chur
- Konrad Planta (c. 1540 – after 1609), dean of Chur Cathedral
- Johann von Planta (died 1615), Grisons jurist, politician and envoy
- Pompeius Planta (1570–1621), Grisons political leader during the Bündner Wirren
- Ambrosius von Planta (1606–1668), Grisons politician and officer
- Peter von Planta (1734–1805), Grisons politician
- Gaudenz von Planta (1757–1834), Swiss politician
- Peter Conradin von Planta (1815–1902), Swiss jurist, politician and historian
- Andreas Rudolf von Planta (1819–1889), Swiss politician
- Louis von Planta (1917–2003), Swiss business executive

== See also ==
- Planta family
- Planta (disambiguation)
