= Johann von Planta =

Johann von Planta may refer to:

- Johann von Planta (died 1572) (c. 1500–1572), Grisons jurist and politician
- Johann von Planta (died 1615) (died 1615), Grisons jurist, politician and envoy, his son

== See also ==
- Planta family
