= Thomas Planta =

Thomas Planta may refer to:

- Thomas Planta (knight) (mentioned 1356–1386), knight and Ammann of the Upper Engadine
- Thomas Planta (bishop) (1520–1565), bishop of Chur

== See also ==
- Planta family
