= Planta Castle =

Tower house in Switzerland

Planta Tower
- Stradun 92, Zuoz
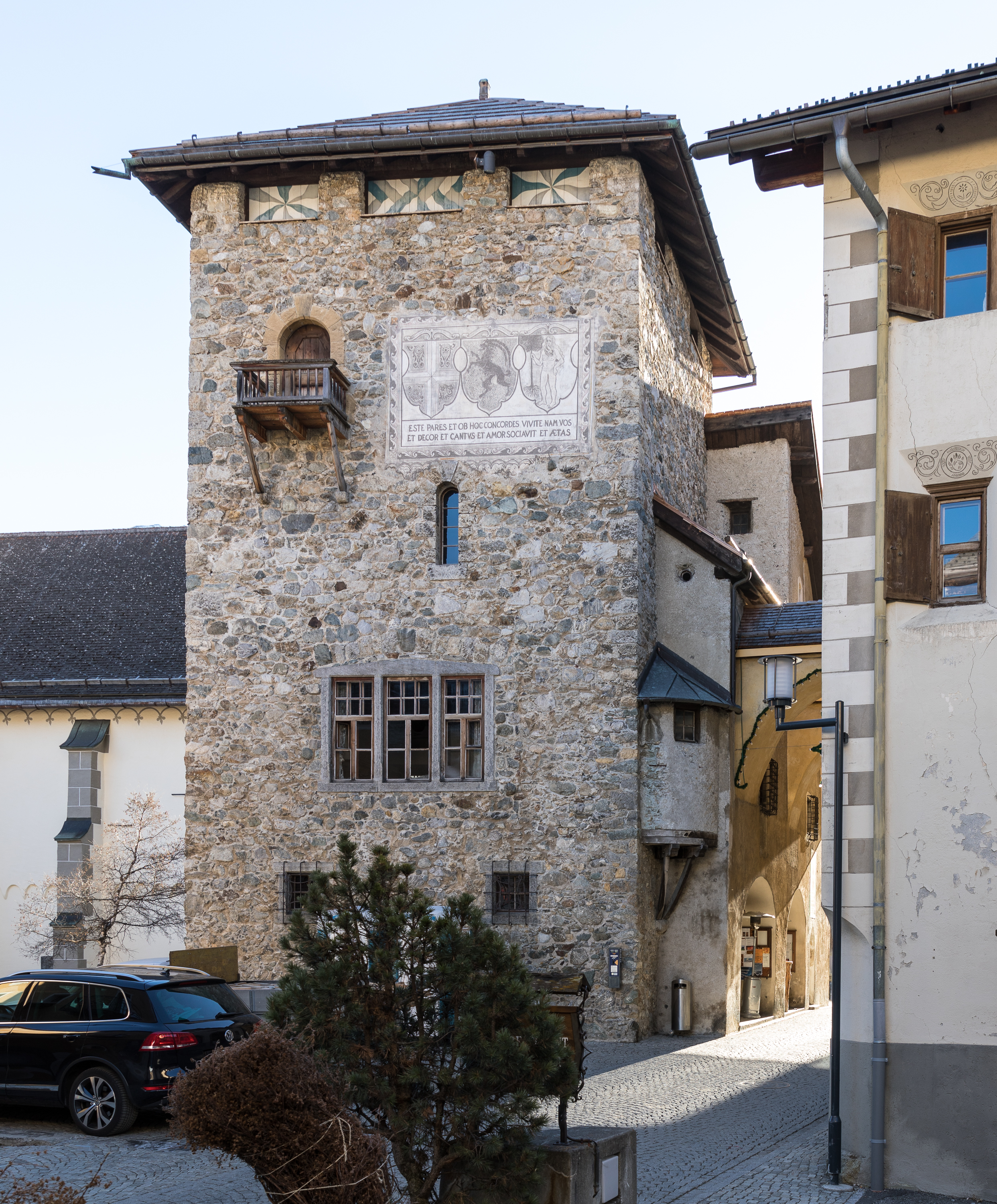
- Planta Tower in Zuoz

Site information
- Type: tower house
- Condition: Owned by the municipality

Location
- Location within Canton of Graubünden Location within Switzerland
- Coordinates: 46°36′07.93″N 9°57′35.33″E

Site history
- Built: 13th century

The Planta Tower is a tower house in the center of the municipality of Zuoz in the Canton of Graubünden in Switzerland.

== History ==
The Planta Tower was the home castle of the Planta family, a widely spread and locally important lower nobility family in Graubünden. In 1137 and 1139 the Bishop of Chur inherited several estates in the Upper Engadin, which he combined with the village of Zuoz to form the herrschaft of Zuoz. At some point in 12th or early 13th century he granted the herrschaft as a fief to the Planta family. In 1244 Andreas zu Zuoz was first mentioned, when he was granted the chancery title, which was stripped from the Pontresina family, by the bishop. The castle tower was also built in the 13th century, either for Andreas or by the bishop.

In 1294 the Planta family received the chancery title again and thereby became one of the most powerful families in the Upper Engadine. Zuoz became the center of their power and a number of other towers and mansions were built in the town over the following centuries. They built castles throughout the region and a number of cadet branches were founded, with major branches in Zuoz, Wildenberg, Chur, Susch and Samedan.

During the Swabian War of 1499, an imperial army under Count Hans von Sonnenberg invaded the Engadine valley. To escape the invaders, the citizens of Zuoz burned their town and the Planta Tower and fled into the mountains. Around this time, the Planta family either sold or abandoned the castle and by the mid 16th century it was owned by the community. In 1555 it was repaired and integrated into the newly built town hall. It was topped with a new gable roof and was at times used as a prison for the community.

From 1901 until 1903 the tower was completely rebuilt under the direction of the architect Karl Koller. He raised the tower with an additional two stories and enlarged the windows. It was topped with crenellations and a tented roof. The north facade was decorated with the coats of arms of the Three Leagues. Since the renovation, the tower has housed the archives of the Oberengadin Kreis and provided meeting space.

== Castle site ==
The walls of the tower still show some of the late-Gothic sgraffito decoration. The tower walls are about 8.1 meters (27 ft) long and up to 1 m (3.3 ft) thick. Until 1903 it was only three stories tall, the upper two stories were added at that time.

== See also ==
- List of castles in Switzerland
