= Konrad Planta =

Grisons cleric (c. 1540 – after 1609)

- Born: c. 1540
- Died: after 26 August 1609
- Occupation: Cleric

Konrad Planta (c. 1540 – after 26 August 1609) was a cleric from the Three Leagues. He is first recorded as dean of Chur Cathedral in 1552, at the age of 12, and was replaced as dean in 1584. In 1571 he received the provostry of St. Ursula in Teglio through his father, and in 1572, as a beneficiary of the affair of the papal bull, he was sentenced in his absence and banished from the Three Leagues.

== Biography ==
Konrad Planta was a member of the Planta family. He was the son of Johann and a brother of Johann. He studied in Orléans in 1552 and in Freiburg im Breisgau in 1559, and was a doctor of both laws.

In 1552 the 12-year-old Planta is first recorded as dean (Domdekan) of Chur Cathedral. After Pope Pius V had authorized his father to recover the church benefices, Planta received the provostry of St. Ursula in Teglio through his father in 1571. In 1572 he was sentenced in his absence as a beneficiary of the affair of the papal bull, and banished from the Three Leagues. In 1576 he accepted a second cathedral canonry, in Basel. In 1584 he was replaced as dean of Chur Cathedral. He did not resign his canonry in Chur until 1609.

== Bibliography ==
- Helvetia Sacra, I/1, 553
- G. Capaul, Das Domkapitel von Chur 1541–1581, 1973, 22, 50–51, 68–70
