= Peter Conradin von Planta =

Swiss jurist and politician (1815–1902)

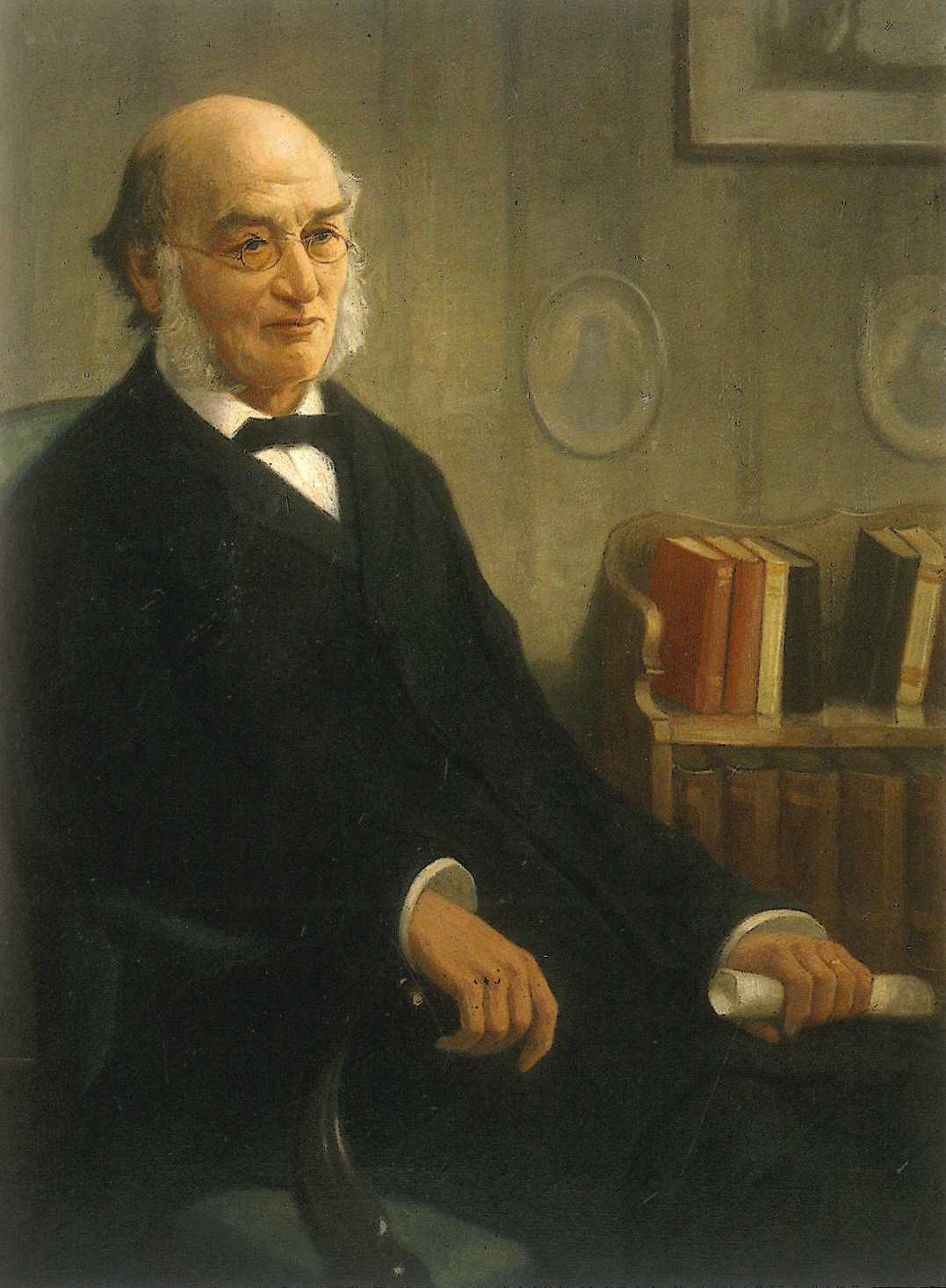
- Portrait by Ernst Schweizer, c. 1900
- Born: 24 September 1815; Zernez, Switzerland
- Died: 13 September 1902 (aged 86); Paspels, Switzerland
- Occupations: Jurist; journalist; politician; historian
- Spouse: Elise Charlotte Bauer

Peter Conradin von Planta (24 September 1815 – 13 September 1902) was a Swiss jurist, journalist, politician, and historian from the canton of Grisons. He represented the canton in the National Council and the Council of States, drafted its penal law, private law, and code of civil procedure, and wrote works on the history of the region, including Das alte Rätien (1872).

== Biography ==
Peter Conradin von Planta was a member of the Planta family. He was the son of Johann Baptista, a landowner and lord of the castle of Wildenberg near Zernez, and Alberica née Christ von Santz. He was a grandson of Nicolaus Christ von Santz and a great-grandson of Peter. He married Elise Charlotte Bauer, daughter of Ulrich, mayor (Bürgermeister) of Chur. From 1825 to 1828 he attended the Wetzel boys' institute in Silvaplana, from 1828 to 1834 the cantonal school in Chur, and in 1835 the St. Thomas School in Leipzig. In 1836–1837 he studied law in Leipzig and Heidelberg.

From 1838 to 1841 Planta was a lawyer in Zernez and at the same time an employee of the confiscation office in Sondrio, which prepared the lawsuits for the restitution of the Grisons property in the Valtellina confiscated in 1797. In 1841 he was president of the municipality of Zernez. He initiated the founding of a "Reform Association" (Reformverein) to create a new cantonal constitution. At first he turned to journalism: in 1841 he moved to Zurich, where he founded two short-lived radical monthlies one after the other, Der Pfeil des Tellen (1842–1843) and Neue Helvetia (1843–1844), in which he campaigned, among other things, for a new federal constitution. From 1843 he lived in Chur, where he founded and edited the liberal Der Freie Rätier, which appeared twice a week (it ceased publication in 1848). From 1851 to 1856 he was an editor of the Liberaler Alpenbote, and from 1860 to 1864 of the Bündnerische Wochenzeitung.

Planta worked in the administration and resumed his political activity. In 1844–1847 he was town clerk (Stadtschreiber) and in 1848–1849 town judge (Stadtrichter). Between 1852 and 1893 he was a member of the circle court (Kreisgericht; president in 1852 and 1854–1859), the district court (Bezirksgericht), and the cantonal court (president 1855–1870). He was a member of the Great Town Council (Grosser Stadtrat) of Chur in 1864–1867 and 1877–1880, of the standing committee (Standeskommission) in 1851–1852 and 1854–1856, of the Grand Council in 1841, 1849, 1854–1859 and 1861 (president in 1850 and 1855), and of the Small Council in 1850 and 1853. At the federal level he represented Graubünden in the National Council (1856–1857) and in the Council of States (1852, 1856, 1862 to June 1863, and from July 1864 to 1872). Planta was a committed advocate of liberal and democratic principles but defended the federalist structure of the state. Attacked from left and right, he was defeated in the elections for the presidency of the cantonal court (1870) and for the Council of States (1872).

Planta was more successful as an author of scholarly publications and as a drafter of legislation than in politics. In his Waldbüchlein (1848) he praised forests as a source of national wealth. Various writings dealt with the renewal of state and society. He rendered great service in drafting the Grisons penal law (1851), the new code of civil procedure (1871), and the Grisons private law (1862), whose complex material he reorganized in language accessible to ordinary people; for this he received an honorary doctorate from the University of Zurich. His historical dramas and popular plays, which had considerable flaws in form and structure, were not very successful. In his later years he wrote a series of excellent historical works, including his main work, Das alte Rätien [...] (1872), in which he was the first to present the Raetic, Roman, and early medieval history of the Churraetian region as a whole. At the age of 77 he published the Geschichte von Graubünden [...] (1892), a popular work that was well received in its time. Planta was also the founder and first president of the Historical-Antiquarian Society of Graubünden (Historisch-Antiquarische Gesellschaft Graubünden, 1870) and the initiator of the Rhaetian Museum (Rätisches Museum) in Chur (1872). His main achievements were his work as a drafter of legislation, through which he decisively shaped and led the development of cantonal law, and his historical research on and presentation of the history of Graubünden.

== Bibliography ==
- C. Jecklin, "Ständerat Peter Conradin von Planta", in Jahresbericht der Historisch-Antiquarischen Gesellschaft von Graubünden, 32, 1902, 1–23 (with a list of works)
- Schweizer Juristen der letzten hundert Jahre, edited by H. Schulthess, 1945, 196–224
- E. Gruner, Die schweizerische Bundesversammlung 1848–1920, 1, 1966, 623–624
- Bedeutende Bündner aus fünf Jahrhunderten, 2, 1970, 36–51
