= Ambrosius von Planta =

Grisons politician (1606–1668)

- Born: 1606
- Died: 6 April 1668 (aged 61–62)
- Occupations: Politician; officer
- Spouses: Anna von Hartmannis; Regina von Salis

Ambrosius von Planta (1606 – 6 April 1668) was a politician and officer from the Three Leagues. He was Landrichter (head) of the Grey League in 1632–1633, bailiff of the lordship of Maienfeld in 1639–1643, and Bundslandammann (head) of the League of the Ten Jurisdictions in 1648. He moved to Malans and was the progenitor of the family's branch there.

== Biography ==
Ambrosius von Planta was a member of the Planta family. He was the son of Johann and Elisabeth Gugelberg von Moos. His father was a son of Johann von Planta. He married first Anna von Hartmannis, daughter of Hartmann von Hartmannis and widow of Rudolf Salis of Grüsch, and second Regina von Salis, widow of Johann Luzi Gugelberg von Moos.

In 1632–1633 Planta was Landrichter of the Grey League. He moved to Malans and was the progenitor of the family's branch there. In 1639–1643 he was bailiff (Landvogt) of the lordship of Maienfeld. He was a lieutenant colonel in Spanish service. In 1648 he was Bundslandammann of the League of the Ten Jurisdictions, in 1649 a plenipotentiary at the buy-out of the eight jurisdictions (Gerichte) from all Austrian seigneurial rights, and in 1653 a delegate to the Federal Diet (Tagsatzung).

== Bibliography ==
- A. Maissen, Die Landrichter des Grauen Bundes, 1424–1799, 1990, 79–82
