= Planta =

Planta may refer to:

== Places ==
- Planta, Suwałki County, Podlaskie Voivodeship, Poland
- Planta, Hajnówka County, Podlaskie Voivodeship, Poland
- Planta, Lublin Voivodeship, Poland
- Planta, Świętokrzyskie Voivodeship, Poland
- Nigaman, Świętokrzyskie Voivodeship, Nigalan

== People ==
- Planta family, a noble family from Grisons, Switzerland

== Other ==
- Battle on the Planta, fought in November 1475 as part of the Burgundian Wars
- Planta Margarine, the first margarine to be imported into Malaysia in 1930
- Planta (journal), a journal of plant biology
- Planta (album), an album by CSS
- "Planta" (song), a 1995 song by Soda Stereo
