= Johann von Planta (died 1615) =

Grisons politician (died 1615)

- Died: 1615
- Occupations: Jurist; politician
- Spouses: Margrit von Stampa; Elisabeth Gugelberg von Moos

Johann von Planta (first mentioned 1577; died 1615) was a jurist and politician from the Three Leagues. He was twice governor of the Valtellina, held the lordship of Rhäzüns in pledge from Austria from 1580, and served several times as an envoy of the Three Leagues. In 1603 he was made a Knight of Saint Mark.

== Biography ==
Johann von Planta was a member of the Planta family. He was the son of Johann and a brother of Konrad. He married first Margrit von Stampa, daughter of Bartholomäus, governor of the Valtellina and a colonel, and second Elisabeth Gugelberg von Moos, daughter of Ambrosius, vicari (judge) of the Valtellina. He was a doctor of both laws.

In the Valtellina, Planta was vicari in 1577 and governor (Landeshauptmann) in 1580 and 1591. From 1580 he held the lordship of Rhäzüns in pledge from Austria. In 1585 he was a captain in the campaign of the Three Leagues into the Valtellina. He was several times an envoy of the Three Leagues, for example to the Swiss Confederates in 1590 and 1597, to the Valais in 1600, and to Milan in 1604. He had the walls of Rhäzüns Castle decorated with paintings. In 1603 he became a Knight of Saint Mark.

== Bibliography ==
- A. Collenberg, Die Bündner Amtsleute in der Herrschaft Maienfeld 1509–1799 und in den Untertanenlanden Veltlin, Bormio und Chiavenna 1512–1797, 1999, 38, 40
