= Spaniola Castle =

Ruined castle in Switzerland

- Tuor
- Pontresina
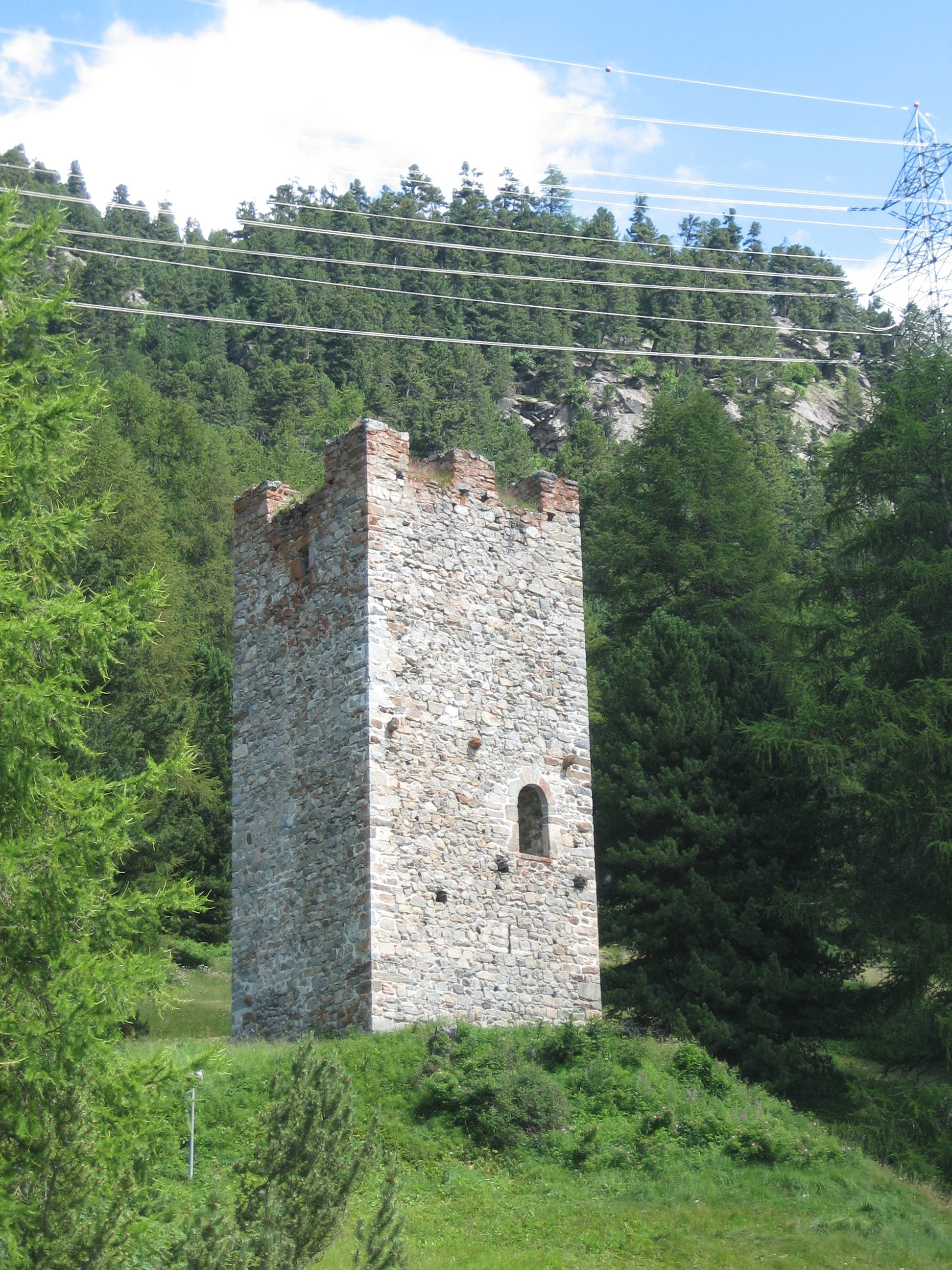
- Ruins of Spaniola

Site information
- Type: hill castle
- Code: CH-GR
- Condition: ruin

Location
- Location within Canton of Graubünden Location within Switzerland
- Coordinates: 46°29′21.46″N 9°54′35.50″E
- Height: 1,878 m above the sea

Site history
- Built: around 1200

Spaniola Castle is a ruined castle in the municipality of Pontresina of the Canton of Graubünden in Switzerland.

== History ==
The tower was built around 1200 for the local noble Pontresina family and originally was known by that name. The village first appeared in 1137 as ad Pontern Sarisinam. The Pontresina family was probably fairly wealthy and powerful in the early 13th century, but often quarreled with the Bishop of Chur. They are first mentioned in 1244 when they were stripped the office of chancery over the Upper Engadine by the bishop. They apparently later regained the office because in 1294 they pledged it to the Planta family. Their fortunes quickly declined and the last member of the family is mentioned in 1307, with the castle going to the Murell family.

Pontresina Castle was abandoned by the 15th century. In 1550 Ulrich Campell records that the castle is a ruin. In the 18th or 19th century it started to be referred to as Spaniola. The tower was repaired and strengthened in 1994.

== Castle site ==
Spaniola is located on a hill near the village of Pontresina. It is a five sided bergfried (a tower not designed for permanent habitation) that is still four stories tall. The unusual five sided shape may have been an attempt by the builder to protect the castle from rock slides or avalanches, the pointed side faces the mountain. The original high entrance was located on the second story of the south-west wall. The tower was crowned by with crenellations and probably had a pyramidal roof in the center. Wooden balconies or a platform surrounded the upper level. It was probably surrounded by a small ring wall which enclosed a 15 by 15 meters (49 ft × 49 ft) space.

== Gallery ==
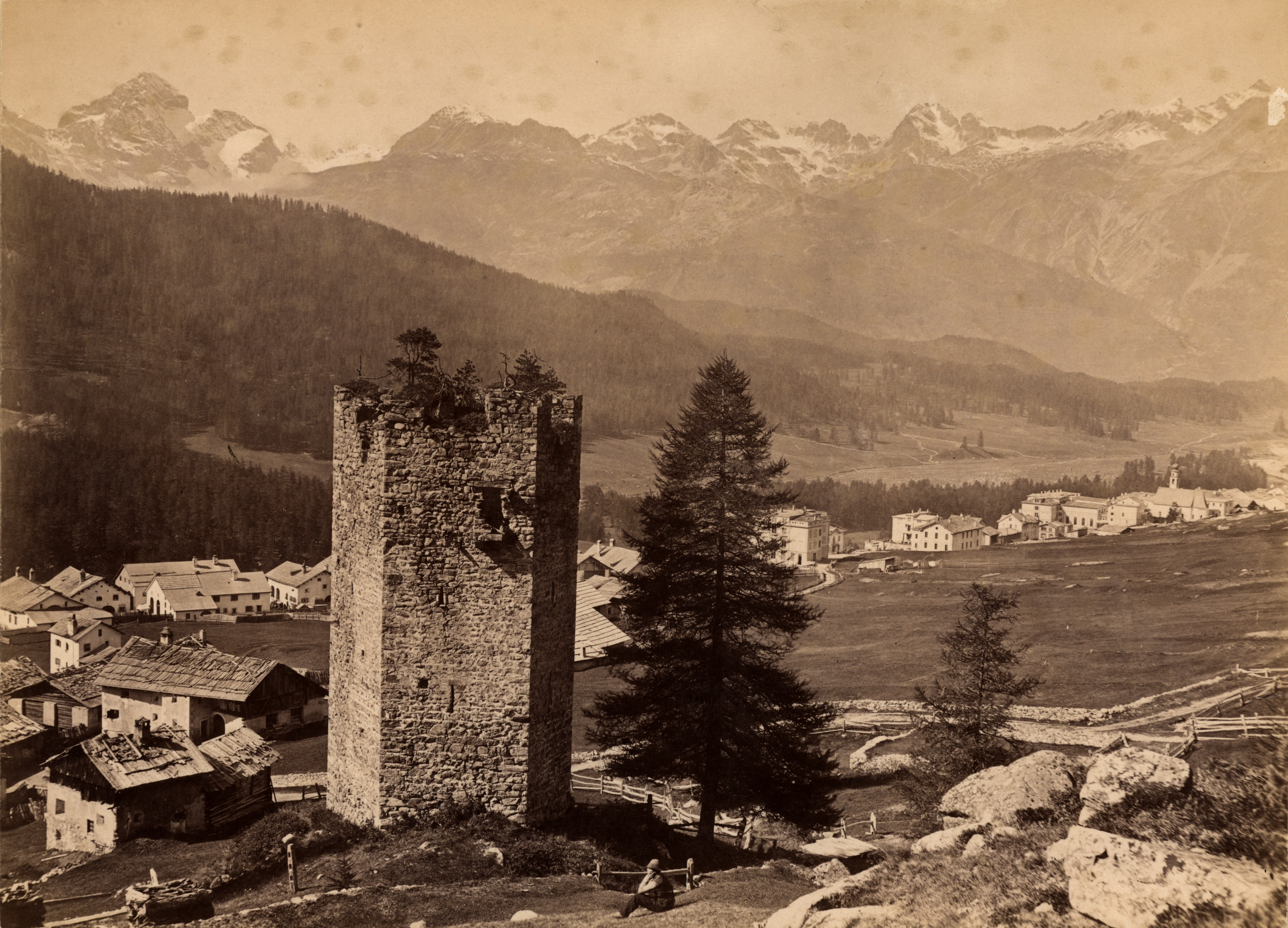
The tower in 1870

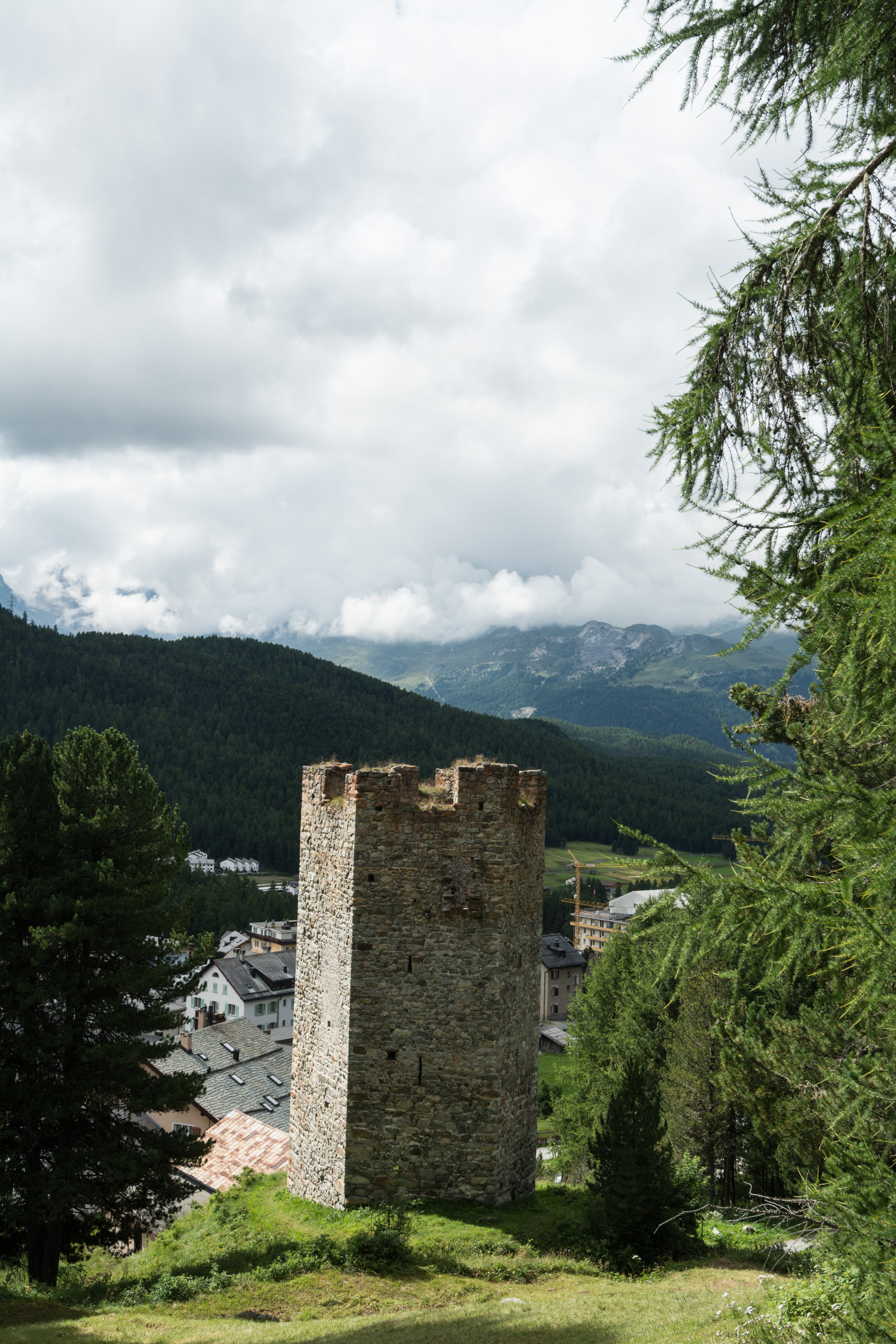
Pontresina village and the castle

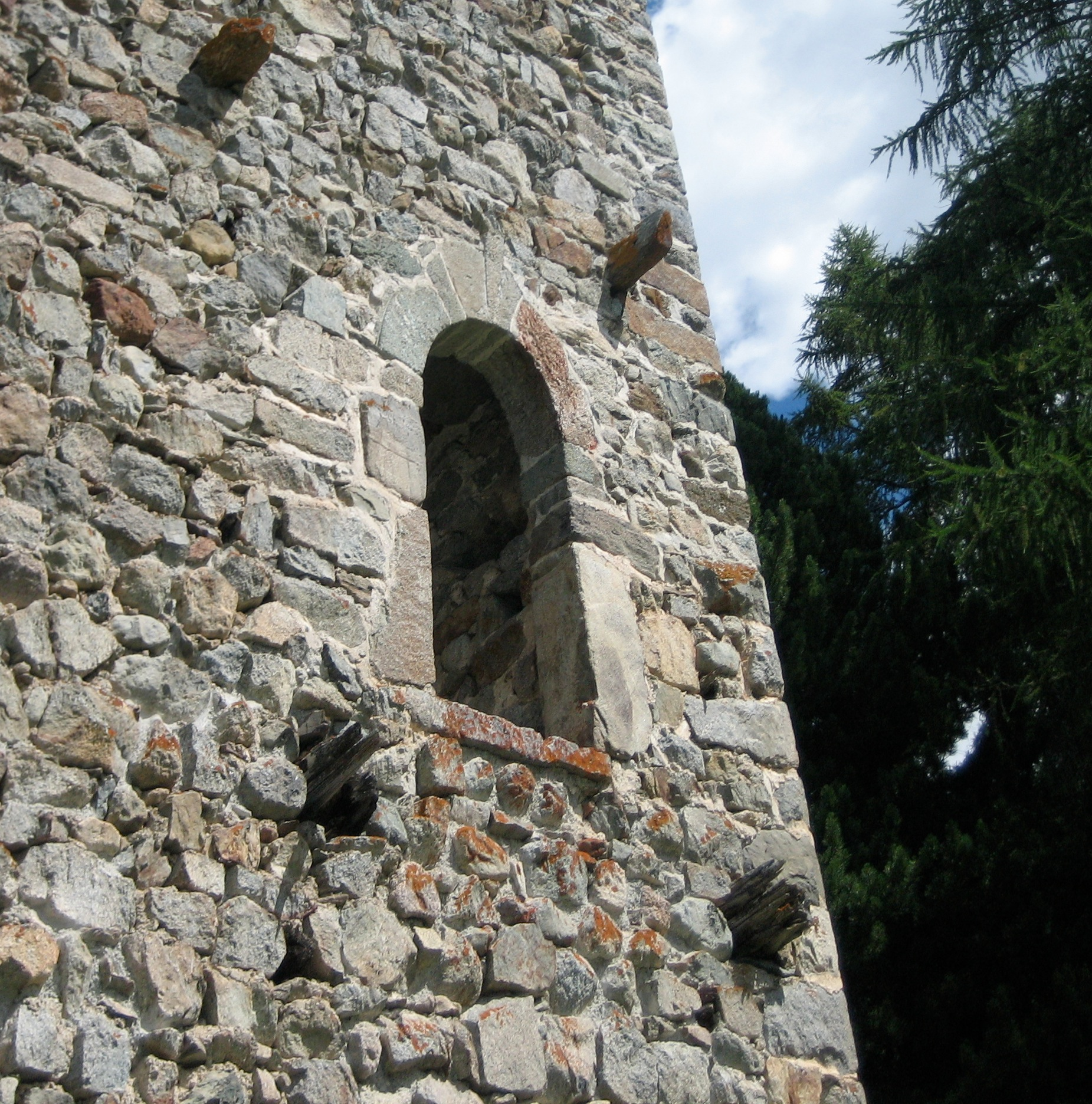
High entrance on the south-west side

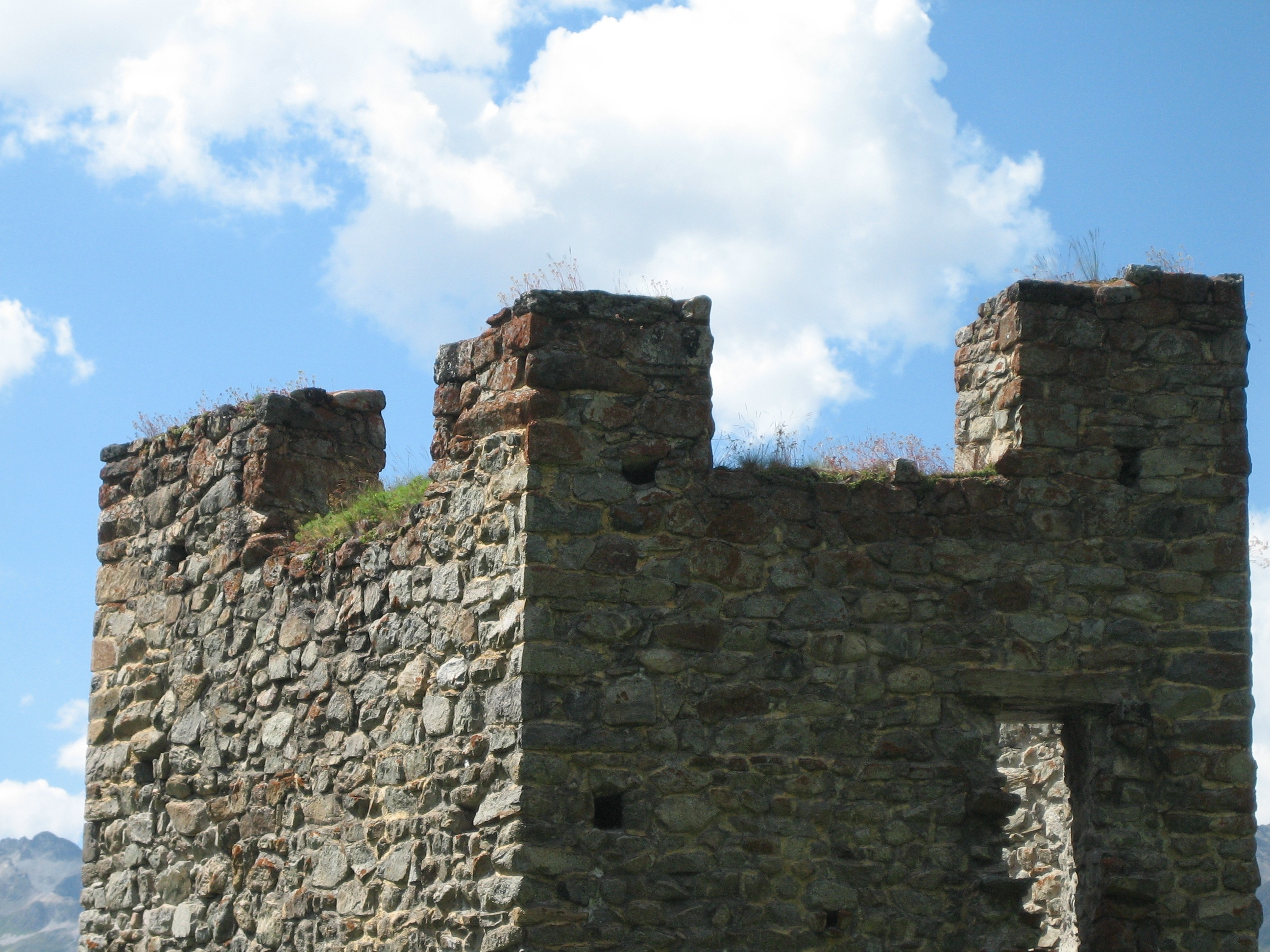
Crenellations on the top of the tower

== See also ==
- List of castles in Switzerland
