= Anton von Salis-Soglio =

Grisons politician (1702–1765)

- Born: 10 September 1702; Soglio, Three Leagues
- Died: 22 August 1765 (aged 62); Chur, Three Leagues
- Occupations: Politician; military officer
- Spouse: Margarethe von Salis-Soglio

Anton von Salis-Soglio (10 September 1702 – 22 August 1765) was a politician and officer from the Three Leagues. A colonel and the proprietor of a Grisons regiment in Spanish service, he was three times president of the League of God's House between 1751 and 1764. His work for the third capitulation with Milan made him one of the most influential Grisons politicians of the 18th century.

== Biography ==
Anton von Salis-Soglio was born on 10 September 1702 in Soglio, now part of the municipality of Bregaglia. He was the son of Baptista, commissari (commissioner). He married Margarethe von Salis-Soglio, daughter of Peter. His daughter Margreth married Peter von Planta.

In 1725 and 1726 Salis was podestà of the Bregaglia. He was a councillor and city judge (Stadtrichter) of Chur, and in 1751–1755, 1757–1761 and 1762–1764 president (Bundspräsident) of the League of God's House. He was first a colonel and the proprietor of a Grisons regiment in Spanish service, and later turned to France. In the dispute over the episcopal election of 1755 he made his name on the side of the League of God's House. His efforts to bring about a concordat with the pope were unsuccessful, but his work for the third capitulation with Milan made him one of the most influential Grisons politicians of the 18th century. He died in Chur on 22 August 1765.

== Bibliography ==
- Schweizerisches Geschlechterbuch, 3, 690
- N. von Salis-Soglio, Die Familie von Salis, 1891, 266–269
