= Rhäzüns Castle =

Castle near Rhäzüns, Graubünden, Switzerland

- Burg Rhäzüns
- Rhäzüns
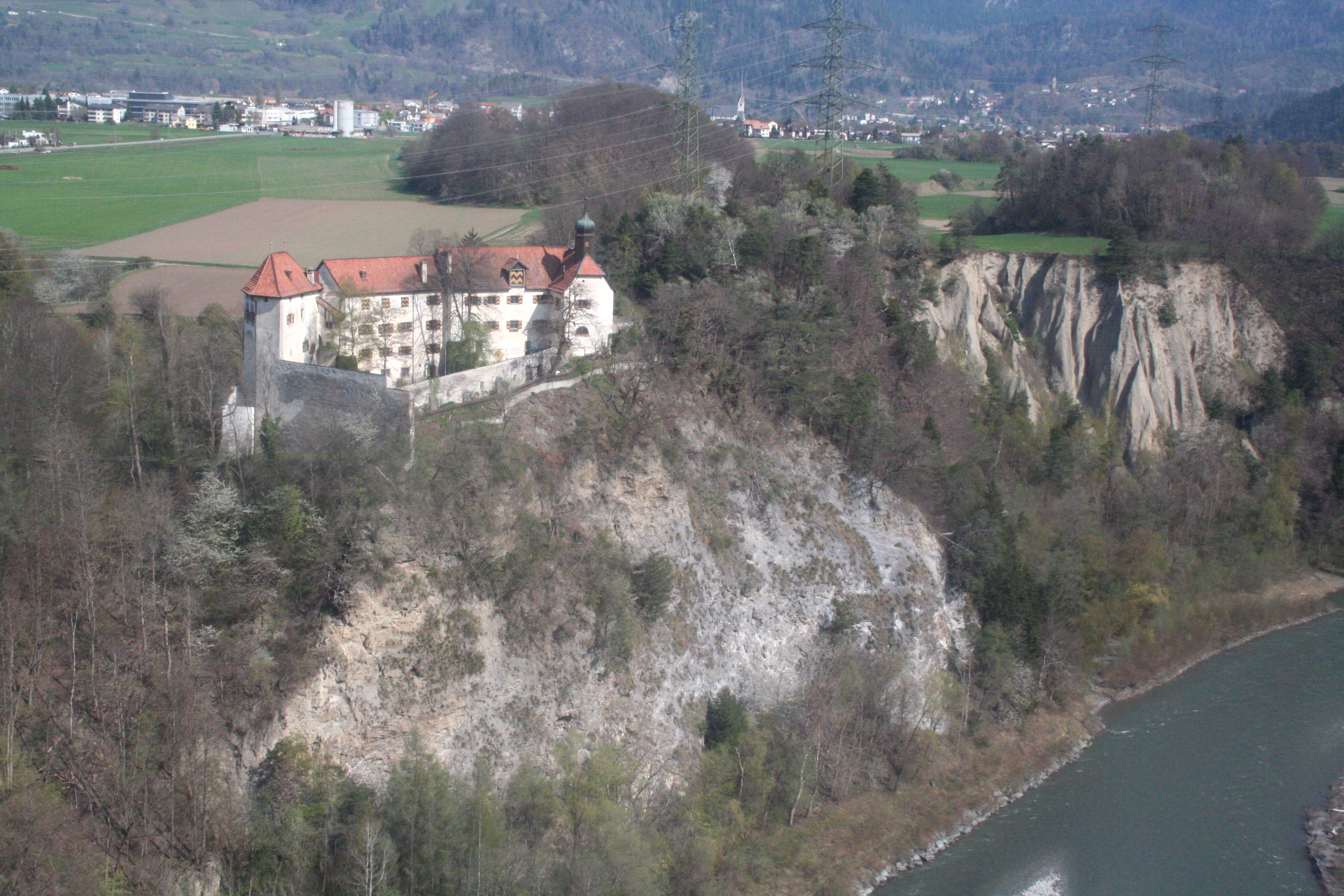
- Rhäzüns Castle on its hill

Site information
- Type: Hill castle
- Code: CH-GR
- Condition: Privately owned

Location
- Location within Canton of Graubünden Location within Switzerland
- Coordinates: 46°47′54.10″N 9°24′11.80″E
- Height: 660 m above the sea

Site history
- Built: before 960

Garrison information
- Occupants: Barons of Rhäzüns

Rhäzüns Castle (German: Schloss Rhäzüns) is a castle near Rhäzüns, Graubünden, Switzerland.

== History ==
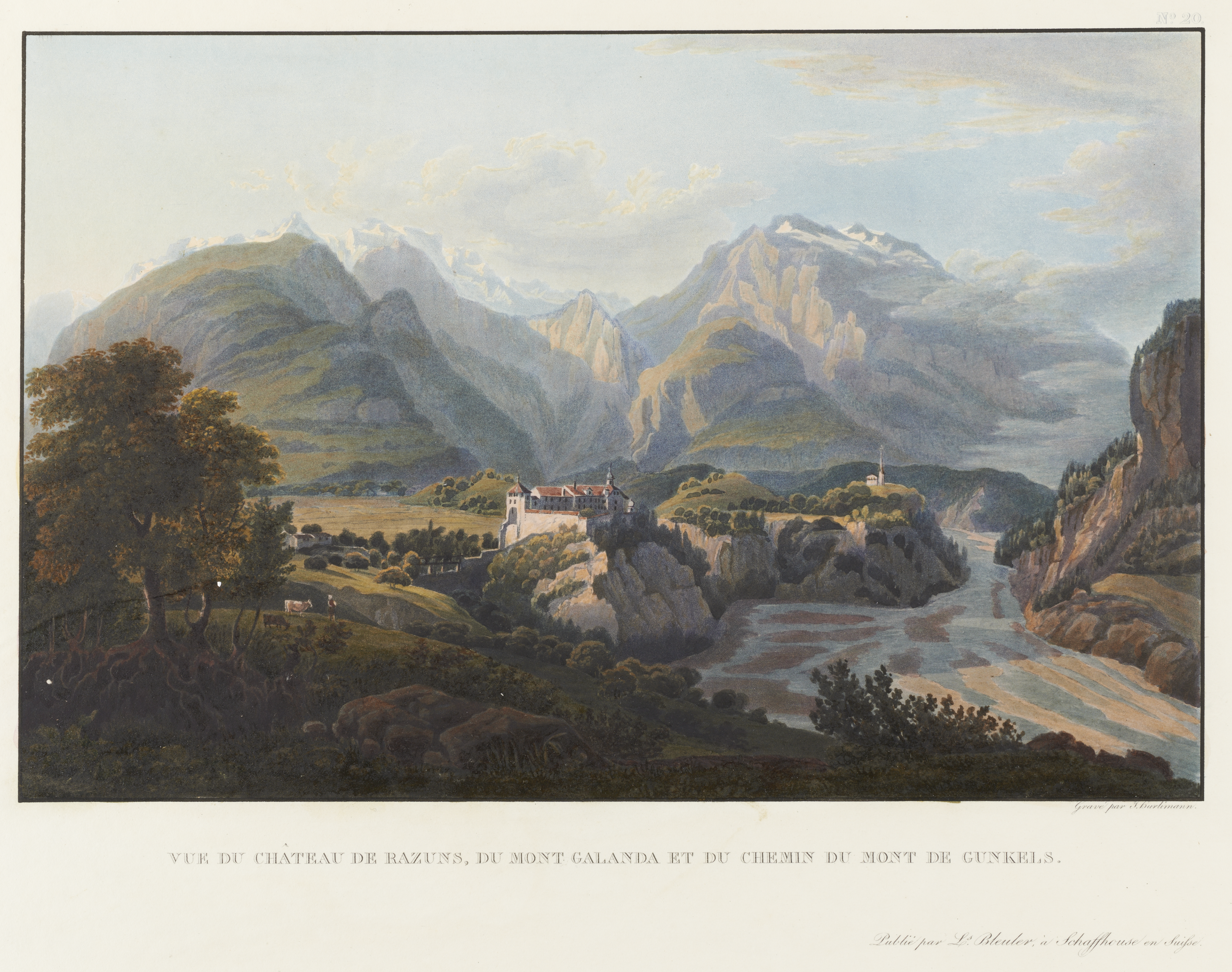
Rhäzüns Castle in 1829

Rhäzüns Castle may be one of the oldest castles in Switzerland. In 960 Emperor Otto I traded a church in castello Beneduces et Ruzunnes (in the castle of Bonaduz and Rhäzüns) to the Bishop of Chur and a 976 document by Otto II confirms the trade and the existence of the castle. Over the following centuries the fortified church became a feudal castle and in 1139 Arnoldus de Ruzunne appears in the records as a Romansh noble, though the castle is first mentioned in 1282. During the 12th and 13th centuries the Rhäzüns family grew to become one of the most powerful noble families in the region, with Rhäzüns Castle remaining the center of their power. In 1343 they were powerful enough that a peace treaty between Disentis Abbey and Glarus was signed in the courtyard of Rhäzüns.

By the 1380s they had acquired land in Domleschg and around Heinzenberg Castle, which brought the counts into conflict with the Bishop of Chur. To protect themselves from the growing power of the bishop, on 14 February 1395, the three main nobles of the region (the abbot of Disentis Abbey, Johannes von Ilanz, Baron Ulrich II von Rhäzüns and Baron Albert von Sax-Misox) of the Vorderrhein together with delegates from the Court Municipalities in Ilanz created an "eternal alliance" known as the Ober Bund or Upper Alliance. The decades long conflict between the Bund and the bishop weakened the power of the Rhäzüns family and forced them to join the expanded Grey League in 1424. In 1458 the last member of the family, Georges Brun von Rhäzüns, died childless, starting a conflict between the Counts of Werdenberg-Sargans and the von Zollern. Five years later, in 1473, the inheritance was finally settled and the castle as well as the extensive Rhäzüns lands passed to Niclas von Zollern.

Over the next centuries, the castle and its strategically important lands traded owners often. In 1473 Conradin von Marmels acquired the castle from the Zollerns, though they retained the right to repurchase it. In 1497 the pro-French Count Trivulzio tried to buy the castle, but was countered by the Habsburgs who acquired it along with membership in the Grey League. Two years later, during the Swabian War, Three Leagues troops occupied the castle to prevent it from becoming a Habsburg stronghold. However, by 1553 it was a Habsburg fief held by the Counts of Marmels, who added a mill, bath houses, a jail and housing. Also, in 1553 the round bergfried on the eastern side of the castle had to be demolished, probably because the Hinterrhein river had so undercut the eastern side of the castle and wall that it was threatened with collapse.

In 1553 it was acquired by Bartholomäus von Stampa, member of the Italian noble family, followed by Johann von Planta in 1558 and Rudolf von Schauenstein in 1573. It then went to the Planta-Wildenstein family for about a century. In 1674 the Habsburgs were able to take the castle away from Johann Heinrich von Planta and his Protestant wife and gave it to Johann Travers von Ortenstein. In 1595 the Habsburgs dissolved the hereditary fief and instead just appointed a vogt to oversee the Rhäzüns land. Under the Austrian vogt the castle was expanded with a new chapel on the north side and an outer gatehouse on the south-west. Over the next two centuries the castle was home to a number of Austrian vogts. In 1809, after the end of the War of the Fifth Coalition, Austria was forced to hand over the castle and territory to Napoleon. Austria was able to reclaim Rhäzüns after the War of the Sixth Coalition and the defeat of Napoleon in 1814. However, the Congress of Vienna gave the castle to the Canton of Graubünden in the following year, and it finally was fully handed over on 19 January 1819.

A few years later, in 1823, the canton sold the castle to private owners and until 1860 it was the home of the Vieli family. Later it was home to a school for girls before being abandoned and allowed to fall into disrepair. In the early 20th century it was repaired and in 1929 became a vacation resort. During World War II tourism dried up and the resort had to be abandoned. In 1960 it was acquired by Ems-Chemie and after the company was acquired by SVP leader Christoph Blocher the castle was rented by Blocher from Ems-Chemie for the rest of his life. The castle is closed to tourists, except for fourth graders from the school in Rhäzüns who have been invited to tour the castle every year for over 30 years.

== Castle site ==
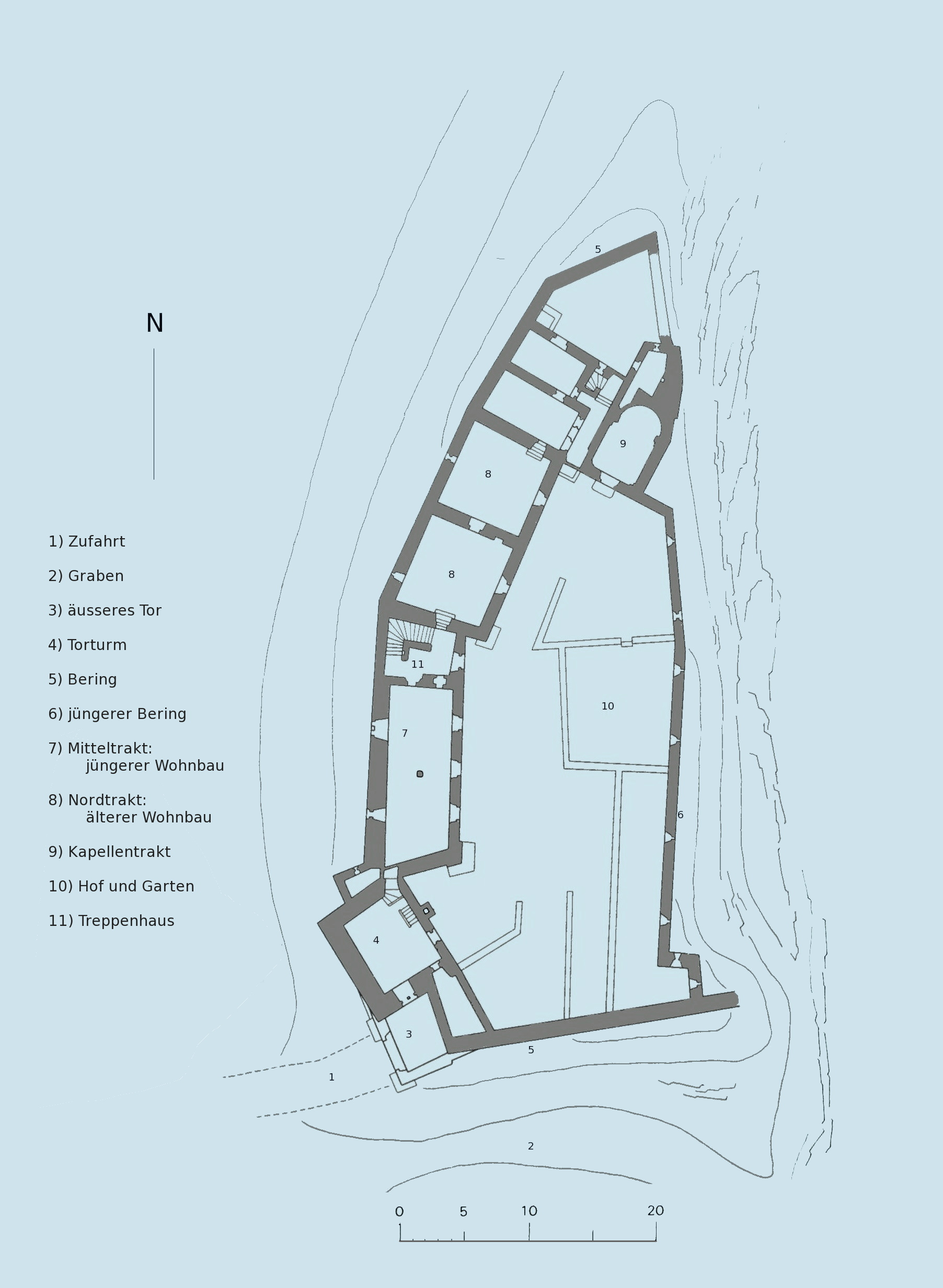
Plan of Rhäzüns Castle

The castle is located on a cliff above the Hinterrhein river near the village of the same name. The original castle site was probably surrounded by a round ring wall. However, around the 16th century the river had undercut the eastern side of the castle which either collapsed or was demolished. Today the north and south walls end at the cliff while a newer wall runs along the cliff and forms the eastern wall. The 17th century gatehouse is located in the south-west corner of the wall. The inner gate tower and the northern residential wing were built in the 14th century and still show frescoes of the coat of arms of the Barons as well as a hunting scene. During the 16th century the east wall was added after the destruction of the eastern tower and the rest of the castle was repaired and renovated. Around 1700 the outer gate house was added as was the chapel on the north side. The newer residential tract was also added in the 16th or 17th century.

== Gallery ==
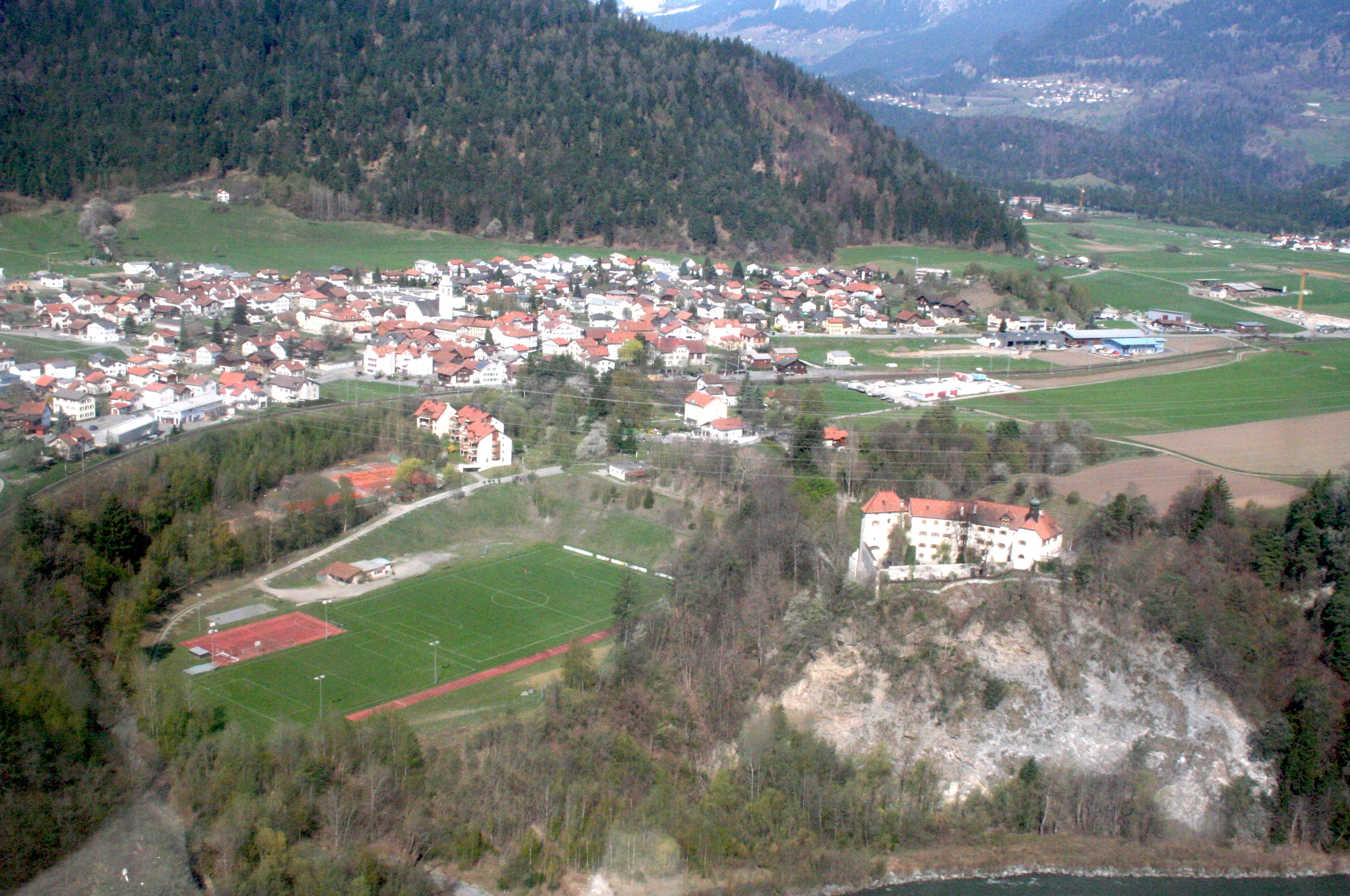
Rhäzüns Castle and Rhäzüns village

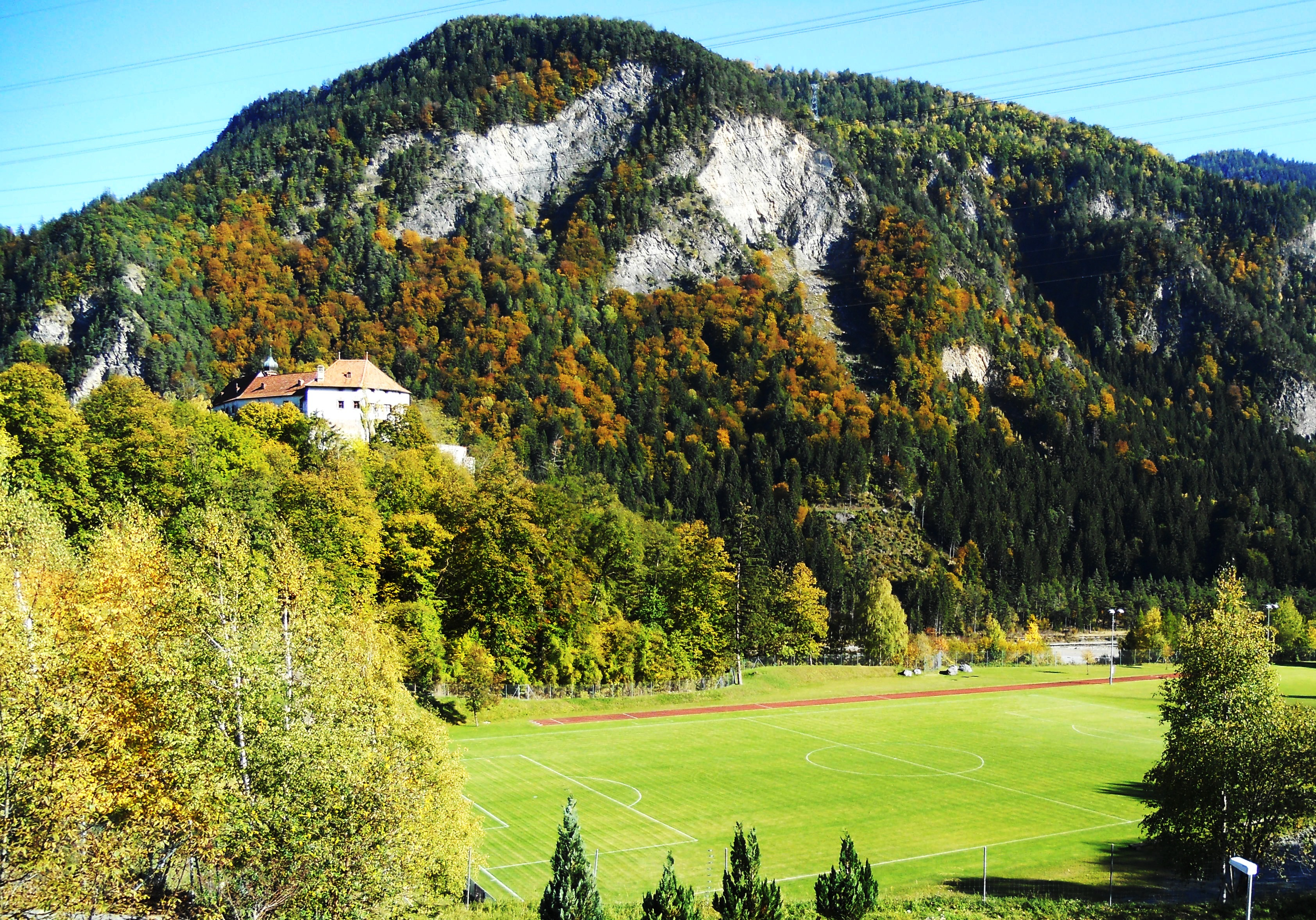
View of the castle from the village

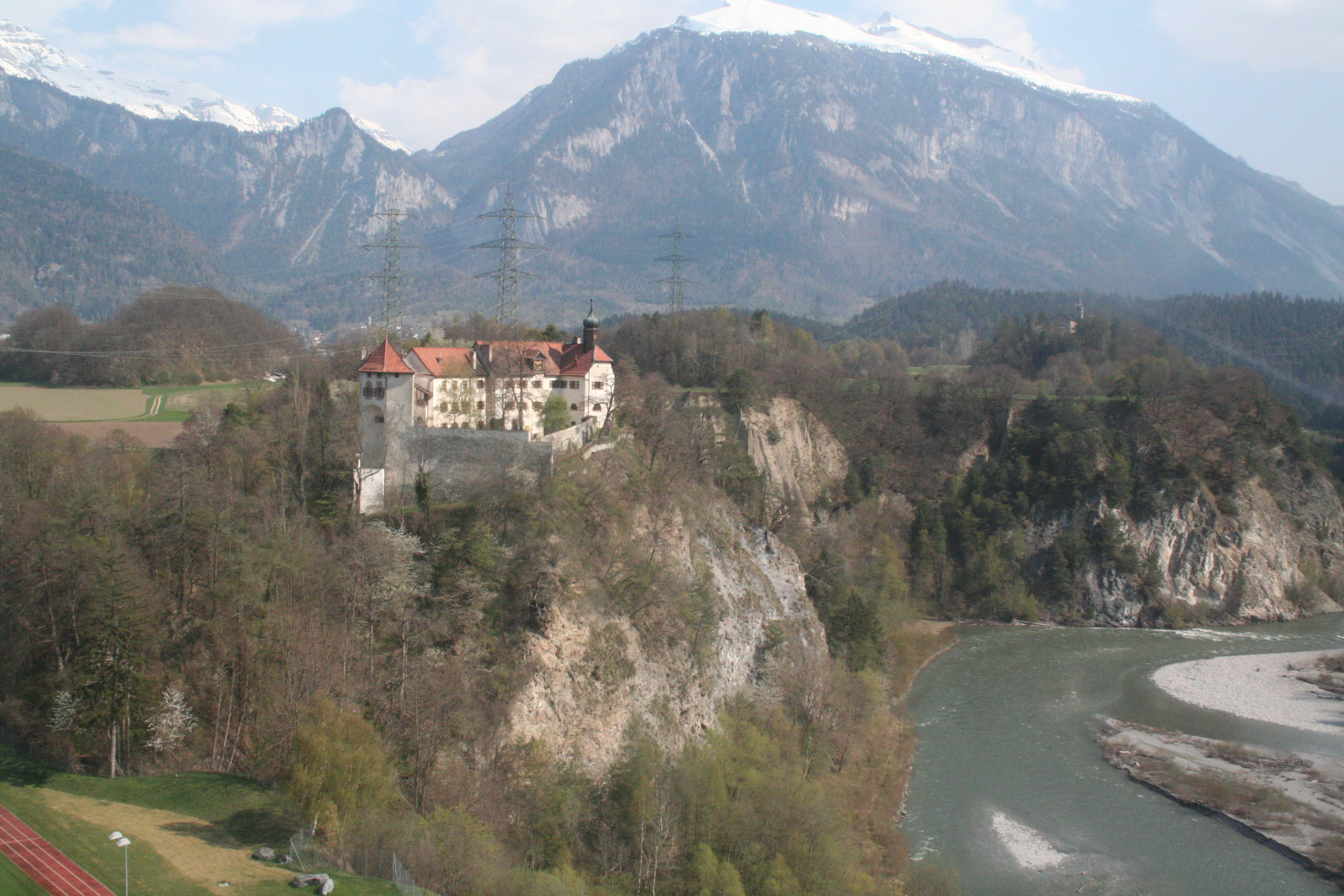
The castle and the Hinterrhein river

== See also ==
- List of castles in Switzerland
