= Heinzenberg Castle =

Ruined castle in Switzerland

- Präz village, Cazis
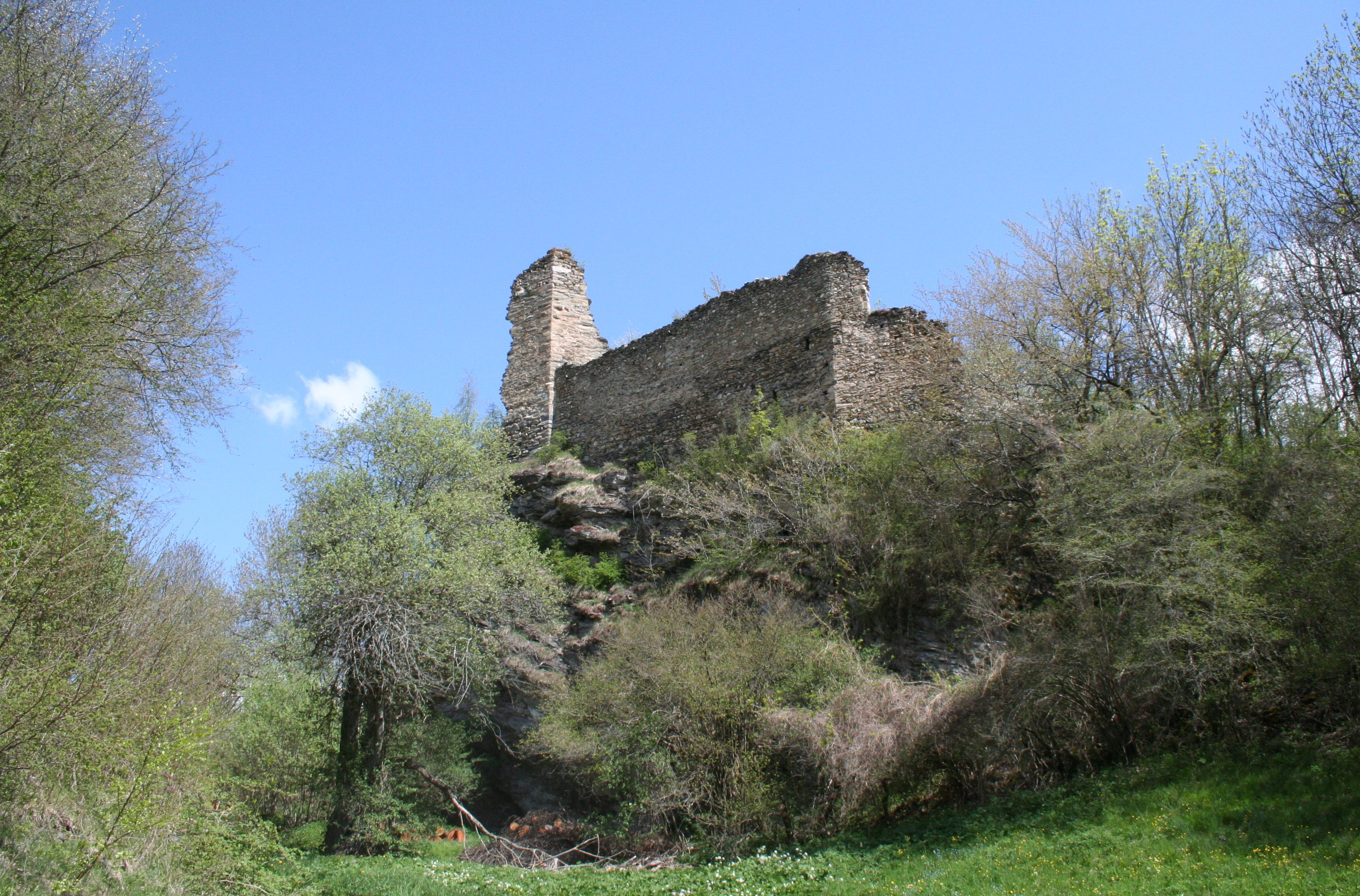
- Ruins of Heinzenberg Castle

Site information
- Type: hill castle
- Code: CH-GR
- Condition: ruin

Location
- Coordinates: 46°44′23″N 9°24′31″E
- Height: 1,130 m above the sea

Site history
- Built: about 1200
- Materials: rough stone

Heinzenberg Castle German: Burg Heinzenberg is a ruined castle in the municipality of Cazis in the Viamala Region of the canton of Graubünden in Switzerland.

== History ==
Heinzenberg Castle was built on the western side of the Domleschg Valley in the 12th century by the Freiherr von Vaz. In contrast to the small landholdings of other castles in the region, Heinzenberg was the political and judicial center over much of the valley. Though the first mention of the castle was in 1394, by 1380 the name was applied to the river and the entire side of the valley. The castle was the center of the Vaz family's power in the region until the extinction of the line in 1337–38.

After the extinction of the House of Vaz (Haus von Vatz), the castle passed through the marriage dowry of Ursula von Vatz to Count Rudolph IV von Werdenberg-Sargans. In 1383, his son Johann sold it to Ulrich Bran von Rhäzüns. In 1450, there was a dispute over inheritance in the Rhäzüns family; the imperial court at Rottweil assigned Heinzenberg to Ursula von Hohenberg, a member of the Rhäzüns family. The castle was damaged in 1451–52 during fighting in the nearby Schams part of the valley. In 1461 the castle returned to the Werdenberg-Sargans family. In 1475, the Heinzenberg lands, except for the castle, was sold to the Bishop of Chur. In 1482, there was a Werdenberg vogt resident in the castle. After the death of Count Georg von Werdenberg-Sargans in 1504, it was abandoned and fell into ruin.

== Castle site ==
The castle was built on a narrow, rocky outcropping below the village of Präz, on the slopes above the valley. A ditch protects the relatively flat mountain side of the outcropping. The tower has a pentagon-shaped floor plan and today is about three stories tall. Before its partial collapse in 1956, the tower was a total of six stories high. It was crowned with battlements and topped with a wooden roof. A second construction phase added a ring wall around the tower. The west part of the ring wall is still standing. The remains of a southern wall show that a several story tall residence probably stood there.

== Gallery ==
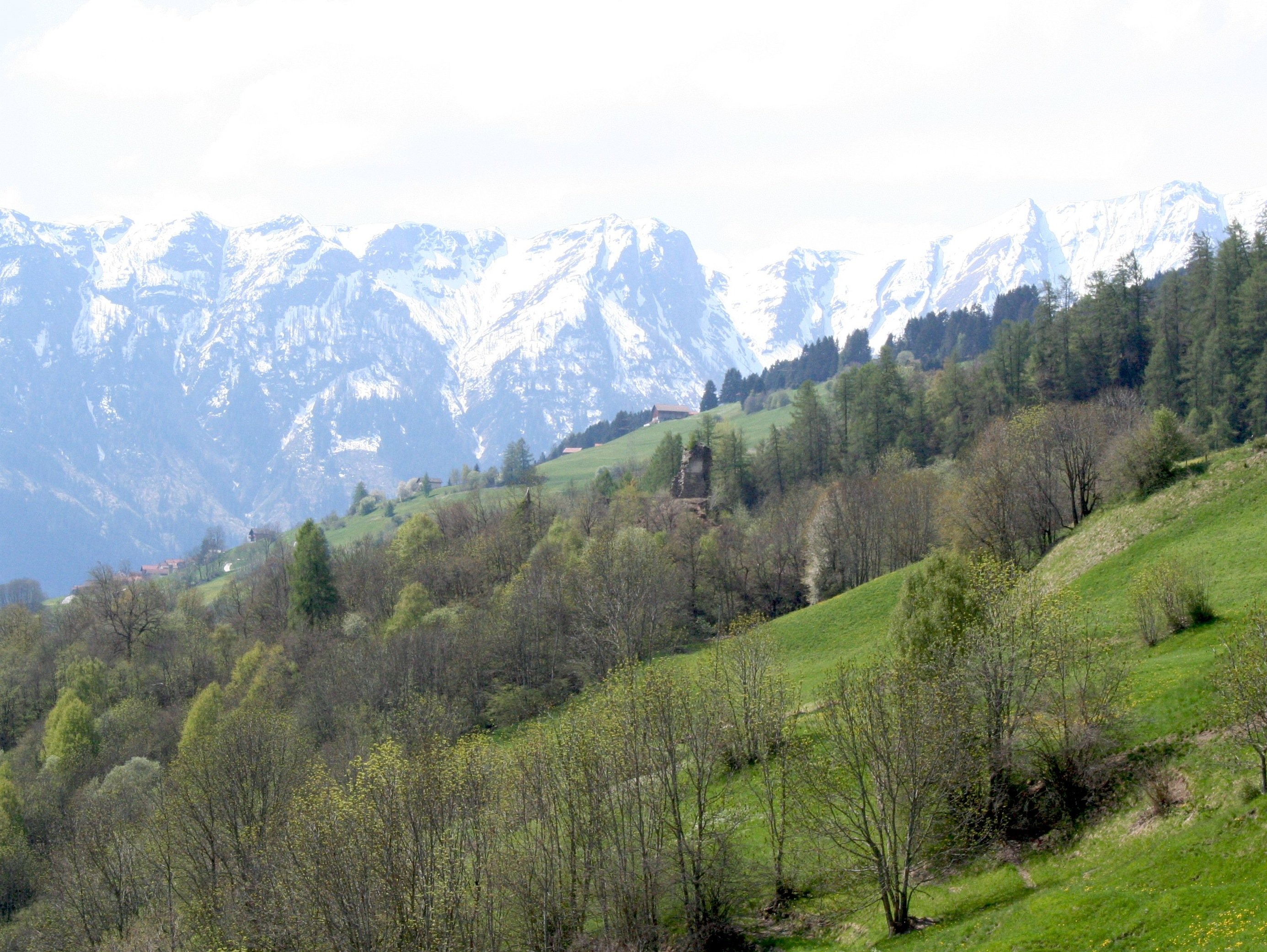
Heinzenberg castle site

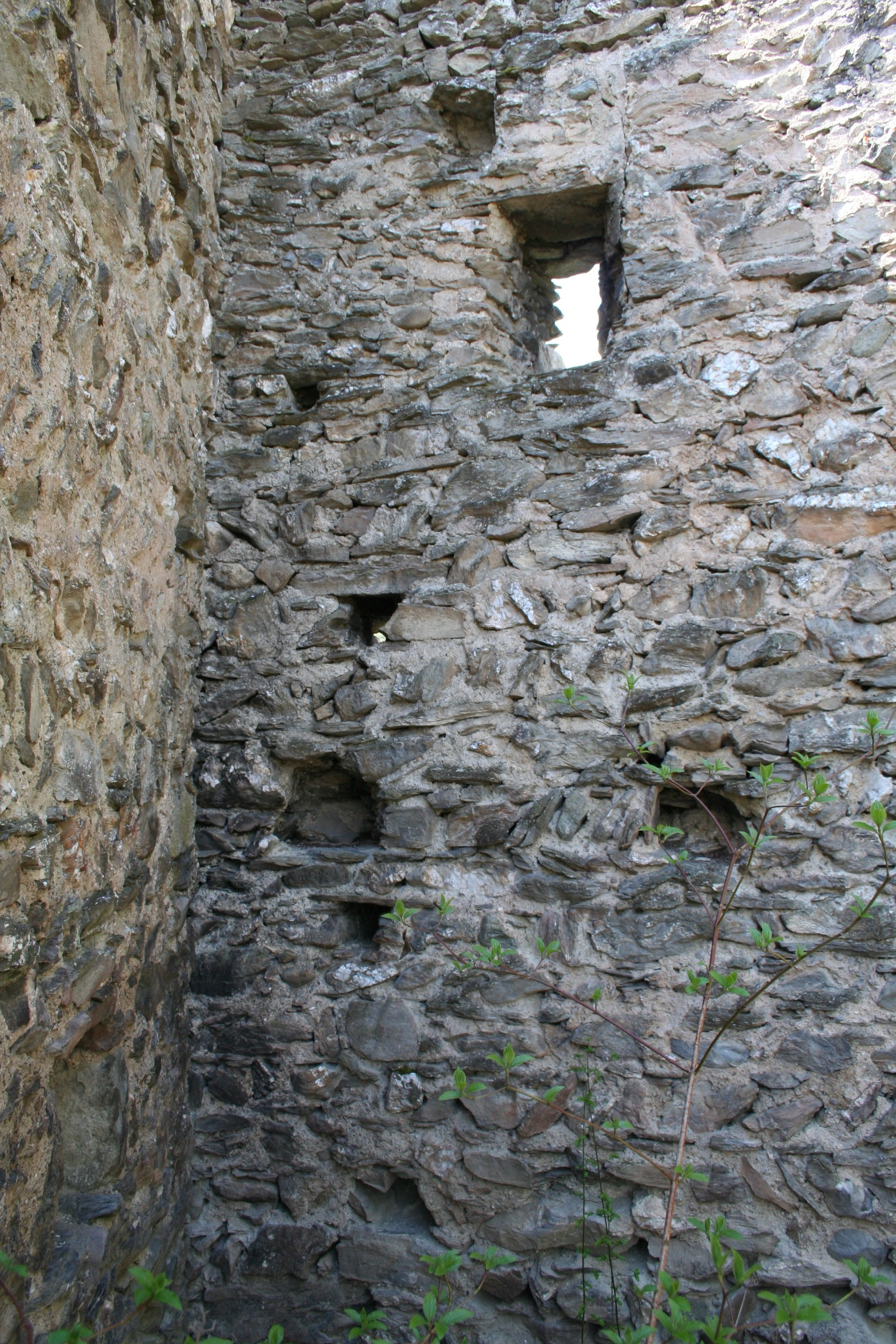
Interior of the residence hall

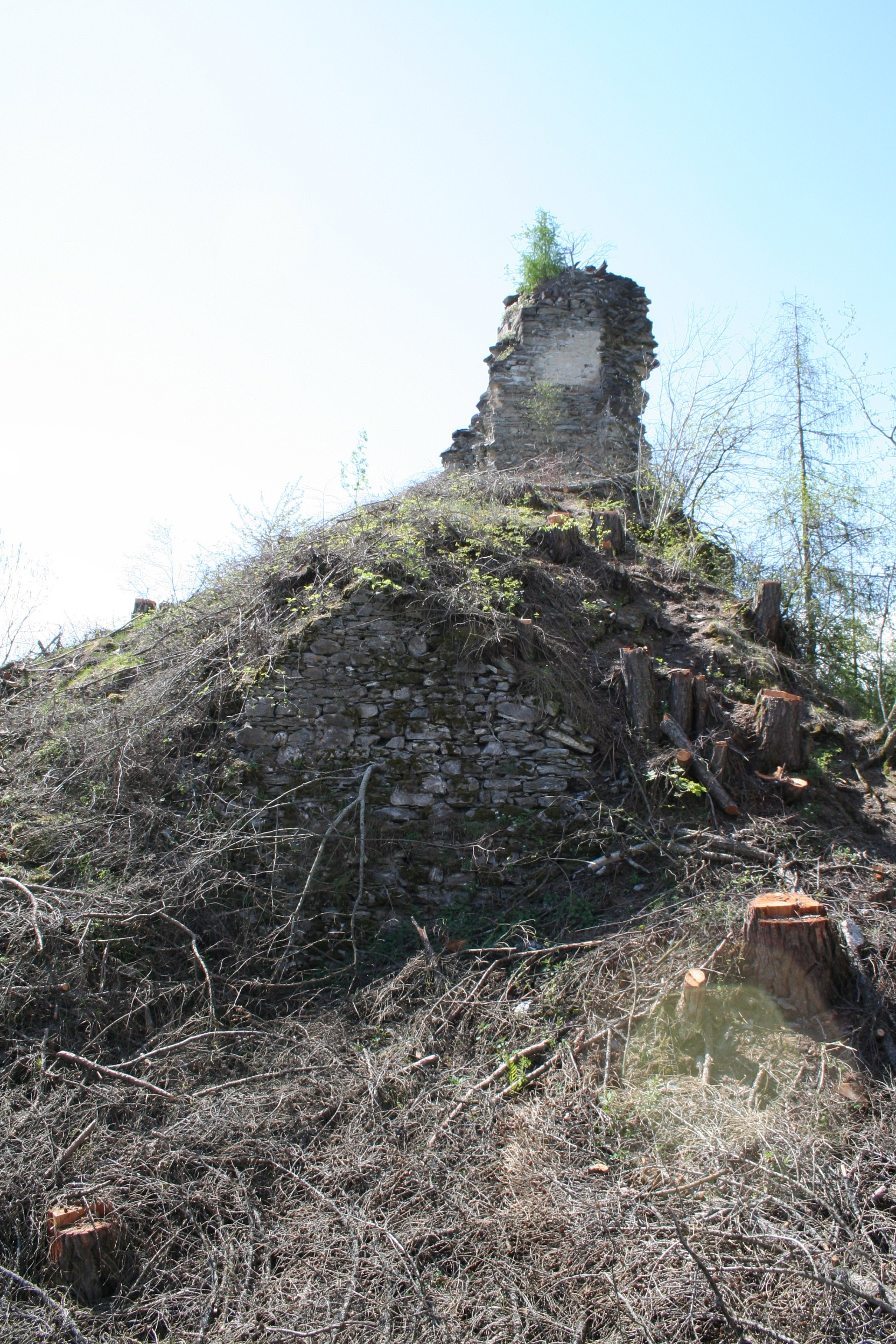
North-east wall

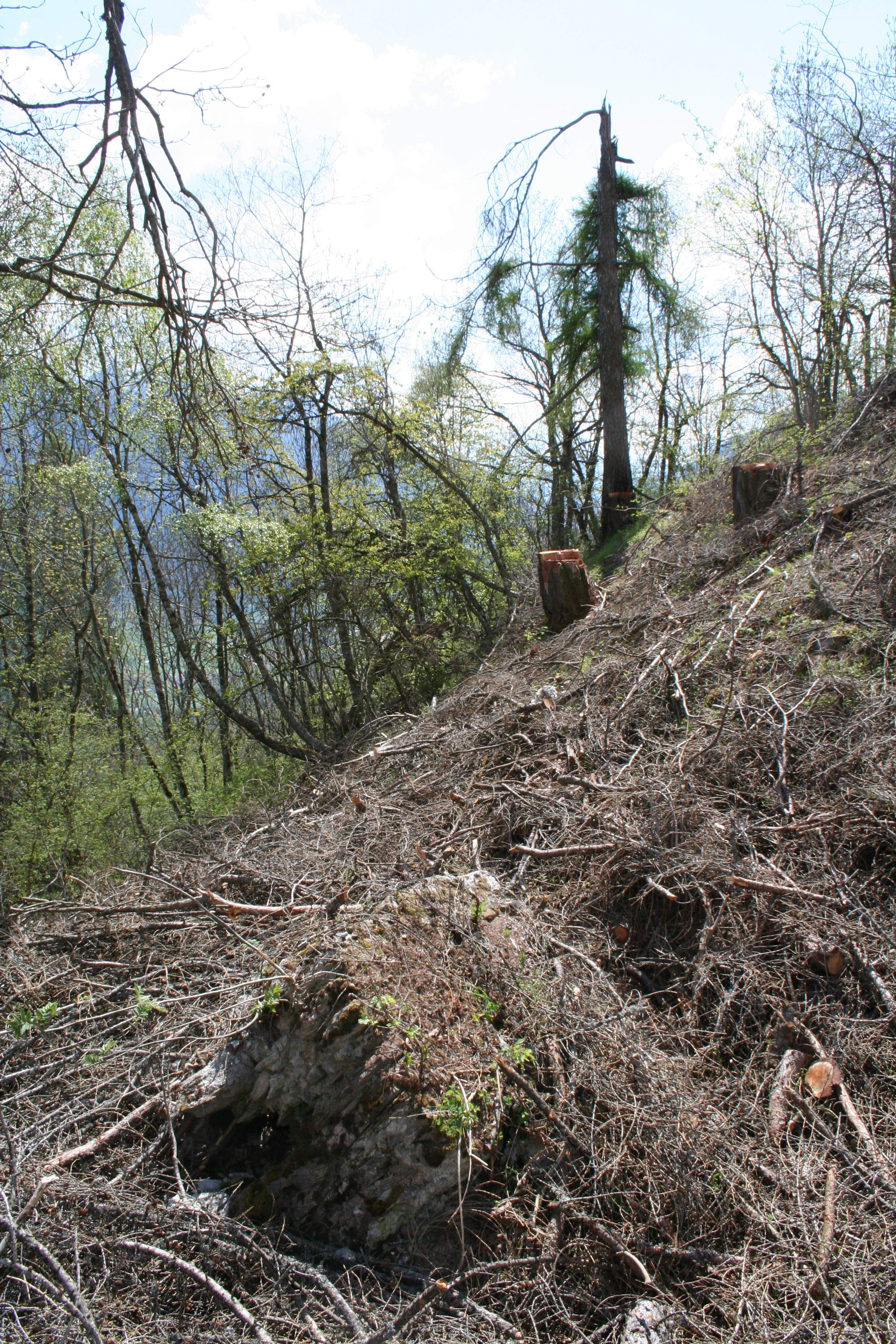
One of the stones from the ruins

== See also ==
- List of castles in Switzerland
