= Gaudenz von Planta =

Swiss politician (1757–1834)

- Oil portrait by Heinrich Kraneck, 1832 (Rätisches Museum, Chur)
- Baptised: 30 November 1757; Samedan, Switzerland
- Died: 8 November 1834; Samedan, Switzerland
- Other name: "The Bear" (der Bär)
- Occupations: Lawyer; politician
- Spouse: Anna Chatrina von Perini (m. 1785)

Gaudenz von Planta (baptized 30 November 1757 – 8 November 1834) was a politician from the Grisons. One of the most radical of the Patriots, he was for half a century one of the leading statesmen of the Free State of the Three Leagues, the Canton of Raetia, and the canton of Graubünden. Under the Helvetic Republic he reorganized the Canton of Raetia on its centralist model, and from 1812 to 1832 he sat in the cantonal Grand Council.

== Biography ==
Gaudenz von Planta was a member of the Planta family. He was the son of Bartholome, a civil Landammann (head of the civil court), and Ursina née von Planta-Samedan. In 1785 he married Anna Chatrina von Perini. From 1769 he attended the Planta institute (Anstalt von Planta) in Haldenstein together with Frédéric-César de La Harpe and Hans von Reinhard, and from 1774 he studied law in Vienna. After returning to the Engadin, he worked as a lawyer and held his first offices: in 1779 he sat on the committee of the high jurisdiction (Hochgerichtsausschuss), in 1784 he was civil Landammann, and in 1786 Landammann. In 1789 he had himself elected vicari (supreme criminal judge) of the Valtellina for two years. In 1791 he used accusations over an allegedly unjust verdict to denounce the conditions in the administration and the judiciary, thereby confirming several of the 15 grievances of the Valtellina put forward in 1787.

He named the majority of the widely ramified Salis family as the main obstacle to reforms in the Grisons and to a peaceful settlement with the subject lands. His rapprochement with the Patriot party of Johann Baptista von Tscharner was driven as much by his Enlightenment and revolutionary convictions as by his hatred of the powerful von Salis. Unlike Tscharner, who advocated the legalist principle, Planta favored revolutionary overthrow. He also sat on the Impartial Court (Unparteiisches Gericht) of 1794, which mainly convicted members of the Aristocrat party. When the Valtellina decided in the summer of 1797 to join the Cisalpine Republic, he was a member of the Grisons delegation that asked Napoleon to mediate. Napoleon agreed, but his proposal, among others, to admit the subject lands as a fourth league found no support in the Grisons. While some Patriots considered exchanging the Valtellina for Vorarlberg, Planta continued to argue for admitting the subjects as allies with equal rights. As an Engadiner he feared the border position that his valley would come to occupy, and as a Romansh speaker he feared the even greater dominance of German. He also owned property in the Valtellina. At times he was skeptical of the Patriots' reliance on France and of the union of the Grisons with Switzerland. After the French army entered the country in March 1799, he became district governor (Distriktstatthalter) in the Upper Engadine, and shortly afterwards a member of the provisional government.

When the Austrians returned in May 1799, Planta fled to Switzerland, and at La Harpe's instigation he became the Helvetic government prefect (Regierungsstatthalter) of the canton of Bern. From July 1800 he served for half a year as president of the prefecture council (Präfekturrat) of the Grisons and reorganized the Canton of Raetia on the centralist model of the Helvetic Republic. From August 1802 he presided over the administrative chamber (Verwaltungskammer) of the Canton of Raetia, and in the autumn he survived an attempted coup thanks to the intervention of French troops. To Planta, the Mediation of 1803 seemed to give too much influence back to the old forces, and he withdrew to the Engadin. From 1812 to 1832 he sat, with few interruptions, in the Grand Council, and in 1815, 1819, 1823, 1827 and 1830 in the Small Council. From 1813 he also often served as an envoy to the Federal Diet (Tagsatzung), worked on the cantonal constitution of 1814, was involved in the building of the Julier and Maloja roads, and in 1825 drafted a penal code.

For half a century Planta was one of the leading statesmen of the Free State, the Canton of Raetia, and the canton of Graubünden. As an unconditional supporter of the French Revolution, he was among the most radical of the Patriots. He was the first to point out the connection between nepotism and arbitrary rule in the Three Leagues and in their subject land of the Valtellina. For a long time the Engadiner Gaudenz von Planta cared more about the Valtellina in the south than about the Swiss north. For a long time he was the most popular man in the Grisons, and his assertiveness, which extended to ruthlessness, as well as his bearing and appearance, earned him the nickname "the Bear" (der Bär).

== Works ==
- Der Bündner ohne Furcht, voll Bidersinn und Wahrheit und doch ein Adelsmann, 1790

== Bibliography ==
- B. Delnon, Gaudenz von Planta, 1916
- Bedeutende Bündner aus fünf Jahrhunderten, 1, 1970, 388–408
