= Articles of Ilanz =

1524 and 1526 decrees of the Three Leagues

The Articles of Ilanz (German: Ilanzer Artikel) were decrees passed in Ilanz in 1524 and 1526 by the Diet of the Grey Leagues. They formed the basis of the ecclesiastical, public, and civil law of the Republic of the Rhaetian Leagues until its fall in 1798.

The articles extended the rights of the communes, in line with a trend going back to the mid-15th century. At the time, this trend was reinforced by humanism, the Reformation, and the rise of peasant demands in Germany, Tyrol, and Switzerland (Peasants' War). Strongly shaped by their political, social, and economic context, the articles reflect the transformations of feudal society.

== First Articles (1524) ==
The first eighteen articles, issued on 4 April 1524, were aimed mainly at abuses in the Church and already laid down most of what would become state law in this area.

The articles imposed strict requirements on the clergy. Priests could no longer have themselves replaced, but had to perform in person the office attached to their benefice. They were required to observe the obligation of residence, take their pastoral duties seriously, and lead an irreproachable life. They were also forbidden to draw up the wills of the dying, and a parish priest could no longer be appointed without the consent of the parish.

The articles further limited the taxes owed to the bishop's representatives and rejected the bishop's spiritual jurisdiction in temporal matters. They were based on seven articles of the Grey League of 20 April 1523, and on a printed draft of eighteen articles of the Three Leagues of 6 November 1523.

== Second Articles (1526) ==
The second decree, issued on 25 June 1526, was more radical. It definitively abolished the temporal power of the bishop and addressed popular demands. The clergy lost any right to appoint lay officials.

The state strengthened its control over the Church and its institutions: parishes could freely choose their priest, anniversary masses were abolished, convents were placed under state supervision, and the reception of novices was prohibited. The election of the bishop by the chapter became subject to the approval of the League of God's House.

In private law, the articles reduced seigneurial rights. The great tithe on grain was reduced to one fifteenth, while the small tithe and other dues were abolished, including the Vogelmahl—the obligation on villagers to feed the lord, his retinue, his horses, his dogs, and even his falcons when he came hunting. The corvée was limited to one day per year. From then on, all tithes could be redeemed (bought out by a one-time payment), and hereditary leases were recognized as the only legal form of tenancy.

== Bibliography ==
- P. Liver, "Die Ilanzer Artikel", in Vom Feudalismus zur Demokratie in den graubündnerischen Hinterrheintälern, 1929, pp. 99–107.
- G. Möncke, "Ilanzer und Sarganser Artikel in einer Flugschrift aus dem Jahre 1523", in Zeitschrift für Kirchengeschichte, 100, 1989, pp. 370–388.
- I. Saulle Hippenmeyer, Nachbarschaft, Pfarrei und Gemeinde in Graubünden 1400–1600, 1997.
