= Planta margarine =

Dutch brand

Planta is a brand of margarine produced by Flora Food Group for Belgium, France, Malaysia, and Portugal. It is made from vegetable oil consisting of rapeseed, maize, and sunflower.

== History ==
Planta was the first margarine to be imported into Malaysia in 1930.

=== Planta scandal ===
In August 1960, tens of thousands of people in the Netherlands got sick and two died after eating Planta margarine, with the cause later being attributed to the use of a new additive; this came to be known as the Planta scandal in Europe. The product was rebranded as Brio and later as Bertolli in the Netherlands, though the name Planta was kept in other markets. Planta and the rest of Unilever's spread brands were later spun off into Upfield, which is now known as Flora Food Group.
