= Peter von Planta =

Grisons politician (1734–1805)

- Born: 3 September 1734; Zernez, Three Leagues
- Died: 1805 (aged 70–71)
- Burial place: Zernez
- Occupation: Politician
- Spouses: Margreth von Salis-Soglio; Pauline de Senarclens

Peter von Planta (3 September 1734 – buried 25 January 1805) was a politician from the Three Leagues. He came from the most powerful and richest family of the Lower Engadine and was the last male member of the Plantas of Zernez. He was governor of the Valtellina in 1789–1791, a partisan of Austria, and in 1801 the instigator of the anti-French uprising in the Lower Engadine. He became known for his opposition to the marriage of his daughter Margarethe to Nicolaus Christ von Santz.

== Biography ==
Peter von Planta was a member of the Planta family. He was the son of Johann Heinrich, governor of the Valtellina, and Cornelia von Salis-Soglio. He married first Margreth von Salis-Soglio, daughter of Anton von Salis, and second Pauline de Senarclens, daughter of Auguste-Victor, lord of Grancy.

In 1763–1765 Planta was Landammann of the Lower Engadine, in 1777–1779 vicari (judge), in 1779–1781 podestà of Morbegno, and in 1789–1791 governor (Landeshauptmann) of the Valtellina. He was a partisan of Austria. In 1799–1800 he was a member of the interim government (Interinalregierung), in 1801 he instigated the anti-French uprising in the Lower Engadine, and in 1802 he was a member of the reactionary autumn government (Herbstregierung). He was a follower of the Moravian Brethren (Herrnhuter Brüdergemeine). Planta became known for his opposition to the marriage of his daughter Margarethe to Nicolaus Christ. He was buried in Zernez on 25 January 1805.

== Bibliography ==
- P. C. von Planta, Der rhätische Aristokrat, 1849
- J. Mathieu, Bauern und Bären, 1987, 256–257, 338
