= Thomas Planta (knight) =

Engadine knight (fl. 1356–1386)

- Died: Before 1388
- Occupations: Knight; Ammann; condottiere

Thomas Planta (mentioned 1356–1386; died before 1388) was a knight and a leading figure of the Upper Engadine. As Ammann of the Upper Engadine he was one of the co-sealers of the founding charter of the League of God's House in 1367, and in 1374–1375 he was a condottiere in the Valtellina.

== Biography ==
Thomas Planta was a member of the Planta family and was a knight. In 1367 he was Ammann (magistrate) of the Upper Engadine, and as the representative of his valley community and his family he was one of the co-sealers of the founding charter of the League of God's House. From 1372 he was a co-holder of the toll in Val Bregaglia, and in 1377 he was enfeoffed with the round tower of Vicosoprano. In 1374–1375 he was a condottiere in the Valtellina, and in papal service he captured Chiavenna. He was a leading figure of the Upper Engadine with close ties to the Vinschgau (the advocates of Matsch).

== Bibliography ==
- A.-M. Deplazes-Haefliger, "Die Planta im 13. und 14. Jahrhundert", in Jahrbuch der Historisch-Antiquarischen Gesellschaft von Graubünden, 122, 1992, 78–157
