= Johann von Planta (died 1572) =

Grisons politician (c. 1500–1572)

- Born: c. 1500
- Died: 31 March 1572; Chur, Switzerland
- Cause of death: Execution by beheading
- Occupations: Jurist; politician
- Spouse: Anna Flandrina Tonina

Johann von Planta (c. 1500 – 31 March 1572) was a jurist and politician from the Three Leagues. He was governor of the Valtellina, held the castle and lordship of Rhäzüns in pledge from 1558, and was considered the richest and most powerful man in Raetia. After he seized the provostry at Teglio in 1571, a penal court in Chur sentenced him to death, and he was beheaded in 1572.

== Biography ==
Johann von Planta was a member of the Planta family. He was the son of Conrad Peter, castellan of the Fürstenburg and podestà of the Tre Pievi, and Anna Maria née Planta. He married Anna Flandrina Tonina. He was a doctor of both laws.

In the Valtellina he was vicari (judge) in 1547, podestà in 1551, and governor (Landeshauptmann) in 1553–1555 and 1567–1569. From 1558 he held the castle and lordship of Rhäzüns in pledge, and in 1568 he bought the lordship of Trin. He was considered the richest and most powerful man in Raetia. Pope Pius V authorized him to recover all the Reformed church property in the dioceses of Chur and Como, and in 1571 he used this authorization to seize the provostry at Teglio. In the ensuing Fähnlilupf (raising of the banners), a penal court (Strafgericht) in Chur sentenced him to death in 1572 despite objections from the Swiss Confederates, and he was beheaded.

== Bibliography ==
- G. Bundi, "Beiträge zur Geschichte des Planta-Prozesses (1572)", in Bündnerisches Monatsblatt, 1916, 33–48; 1920, 73–79
- Handbuch der Bündner Geschichte, 2, 2000, 100–101
