= Planta family =

Noble family from Grisons, Switzerland

The Planta family (also von Planta) is a family from the Upper Engadine, with its ancestral seat in Zuoz, that belonged to the lower nobility of the Prince-Bishopric of Chur and to the aristocracy of the Free State of the Three Leagues. First recorded in 1244, the Plantas rose to become the leading family of the Upper Engadine by about 1300. After the Articles of Ilanz of 1524 and 1526 abolished the territorial rule of the bishop of Chur, they were, alongside the von Salis, the most influential family in the Three Leagues. Their political involvement declined after 1650, and in the 20th century the family was no longer politically significant.

== History ==
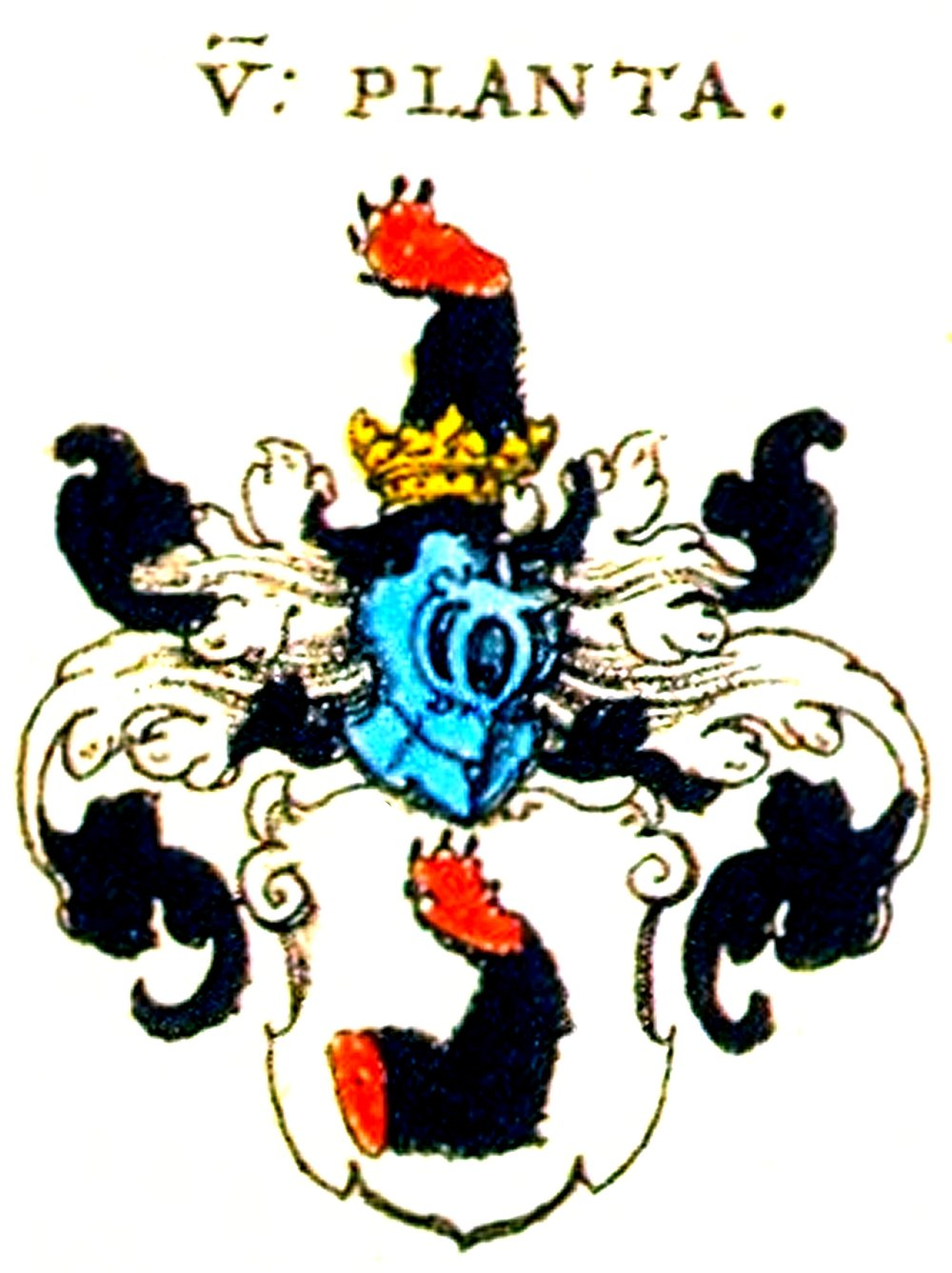
Planta coat of arms in Siebmachers Wappenbuch, 1605

The family's ancestral seat was in Zuoz (the Planta Tower). The Plantas are first recorded in 1244 with Andreas of Zuoz. They were possibly stewards (Meier) of the bishop of Chur in Zuoz, although their status as ministeriales is unclear. From the middle of the 13th century they rose to become the leading family of the Upper Engadine by about 1300. Their power base was the office of Ammann in the Upper Engadine (low justice), which they held from 1288 until the early 16th century. The Plantas owned land in the Upper Engadine and in Val Bregaglia, and in the 14th century also in the Lower Engadine (Zernez) and in Val Poschiavo. From 1317 they were also vassals of the counts of Tyrol for mining rights in the Lower Engadine. From the end of the 14th century they acquired all the mining rights in the Lower Engadine, the Upper Engadine, and Val Müstair, and probably also in Val Poschiavo.

In 1389 the Plantas held their first office outside the Upper Engadine, and in 1407 Rudolf became the first of the family to sit in the cathedral chapter of Chur. In the 14th century several Plantas were knights. From the beginning of the 14th century, marriage ties can be traced with lower noble families of the Prince-Bishopric of Chur, as well as with the lower nobility of South Tyrol and the ruling class of the Valtellina. In 1367 the Plantas, through Thomas, took part in the first compact (Herrschaftsvertrag) between the estates and the territorial lord of the Prince-Bishopric of Chur. From the end of the 14th century they also held offices in the Lower Engadine, the Vinschgau, the Albula valley, Val Bregaglia, Val Poschiavo, the Domleschg, and Chur. In the 15th century they were among the leading lower noble families of the Prince-Bishopric of Chur, with the mines as their economic base. The family divided into several lines: Planta-Zuoz, Planta-Zernez (later Wildenberg), Planta-Samedan, Planta-Susch, and Planta-Chur. A line also formed in France (Valence) that belonged to the French nobility. From the middle of the 15th century the family had close ties with the convent of Müstair, for which the Plantas provided several abbesses until the 18th century. After 1400, in the course of communalization in the Upper Engadine, a new competing elite emerged (the Travers, von Juvalta, and Raschèr families), which led in 1462 to the Five Seals Letter (Fünfsiegelbrief), a new order for the Upper Engadine.

After the Articles of Ilanz of 1524 and 1526 abolished the bishop's territorial rule, the Plantas were, alongside the von Salis, the most influential family in the Free State of the Three Leagues. In the middle of the 16th century they acquired the lordship (Herrschaft) of Rhäzüns. They sat in the cathedral chapter and provided a bishop of Chur, Thomas. The main line of Zuoz declined temporarily until the early 17th century, and from the first half of the 17th century it again held a leading position in the Upper Engadine. With Ambrosius of Zernez, a new cadet line formed in Malans. After the Three Leagues conquered the Valtellina in 1512, the Plantas were, together with the Salis, the most important office-holding family there. In the 16th century, during the power struggle between France and Venice on the one hand and Austria and Spain on the other, they took part on both sides in the conflicts (Johann) that culminated in the Bündner Wirren. From then on the Plantas also entered foreign military service, including that of Austria, Spain, France, Venice, and Holland. In the 18th century they provided four generals in addition to numerous officers.

From the Reformation onward, the family was divided by confession. At the same time there were political rivalries with the Salis, although the two families never turned against each other as a whole. The party conflict reached a peak in the early 17th century with Rudolf and his brother Pompejus as leaders of the Spanish-Austrian party. After 1650 the political involvement of the Plantas declined. In 1675 they lost their pledged fief (Pfandlehen) over the lordship of Rhäzüns to the Travers family. In the 18th century they still partly supported Austrian interests and opposed the growing dominance of the Salis. After 1700 the Planta-Steinsberg-Wildenberg and Planta-Wildenberg-Malans lines declined. At the end of the 18th and the beginning of the 19th century, several Plantas sided with the Patriots. They opposed the Salis and supported the French party (Gaudenz). Around 1798 they lost their last privileges in the Upper Engadine. In 1805 the main line, Planta-Wildenberg of Zernez, died out. Until the second half of the 19th century, individual Plantas were active in cantonal politics and, from 1848, in federal politics (Andreas Rudolf, Peter Conradin). In the 20th century the family was no longer politically significant.

== Bibliography ==
- P. von Planta, Chronik der Familie von Planta nebst verschiedenen Mittheilungen aus der Vergangenheit Rhätiens, 1892
- Schweizerisches Geschlechterbuch, 1, 400–413; 7, 401–426
- P. E. Grimm, Die Anfänge der Bündner Aristokratie im 15. und 16. Jahrhundert, 1981
- S. Färber, Der bündnerische Herrenstand im 17. Jahrhundert, 1983
- J. Mathieu, Bauern und Bären, 1987
- A.-M. Deplazes-Haefliger, "Die von Planta im 13. und 14. Jahrhundert", in Jahrbuch der Historisch-Antiquarischen Gesellschaft von Graubünden, 122, 1992, 77–157
- P. C. von Planta, "Die Planta im Spätmittelalter", in Jahrbuch der Historischen Gesellschaft von Graubünden, 126, 1996, 225–332
- A. Collenberg, Die Bündner Amtsleute in der Herrschaft Maienfeld 1509–1799 und in den Untertanenlanden Veltlin, Bormio und Chiavenna 1512–1797, 1999
- Handbuch der Bündner Geschichte, 1–2, 2000

=== Archives ===
- Family archives, Staatsarchiv Graubünden, Chur
