= De Salis =

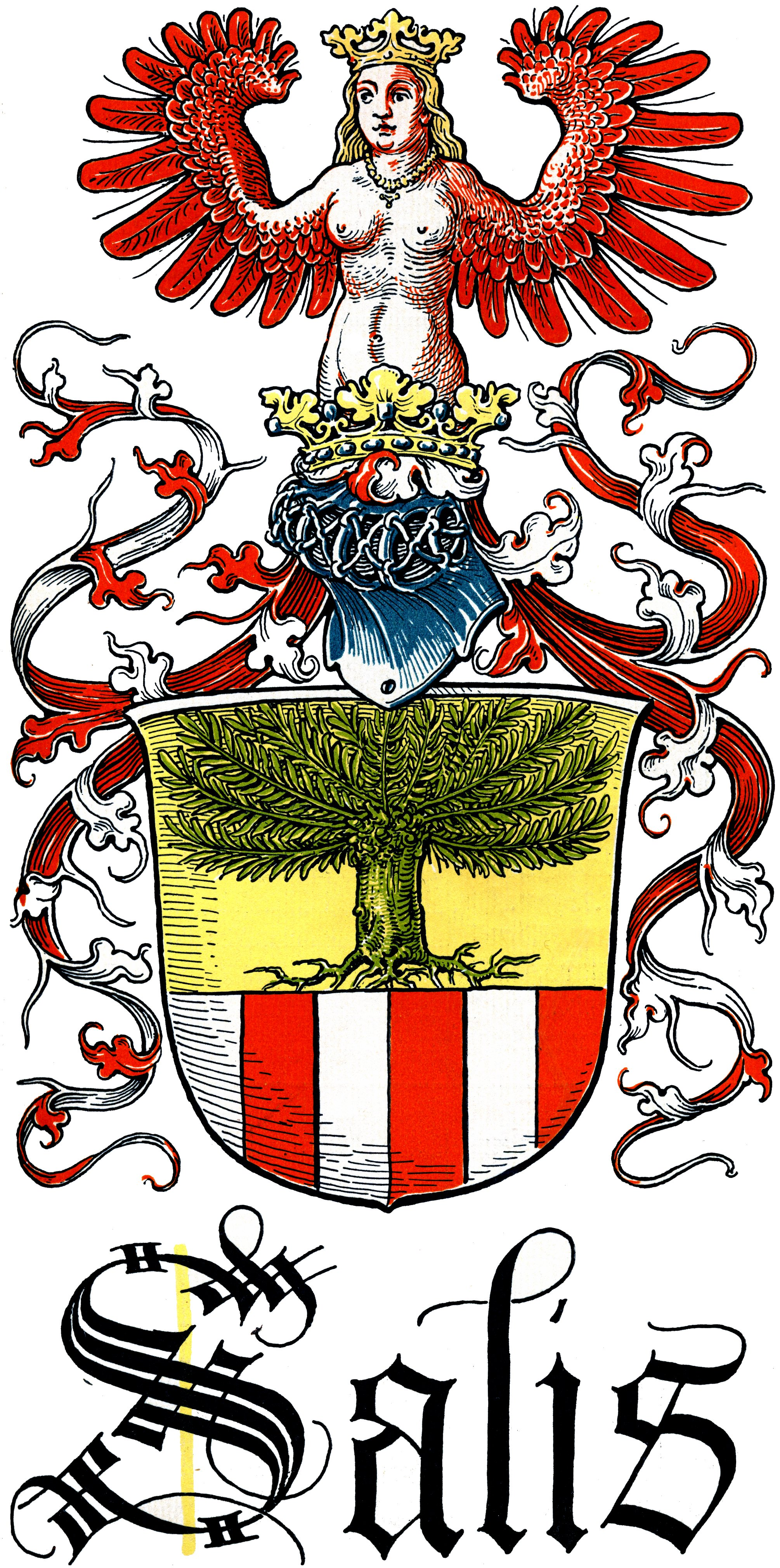
Salis family coat of arms

De Salis is an old Swiss noble family originating in Grisons, Switzerland. By gaining the title of Count of the Holy Roman Empire, the family later became part of the Nobility of the Holy Roman Empire.

== People with the surname ==
They were one of the most influential families of the Three Leagues. At first the family appears in Soglio, Switzerland with ser Rodolfus de Salice de Solio between 1285 and 1293.

Titles given to the family include Count de Salis-Soglio and Count de Salis-Seewis.

=== De Salis (naturalized British in 1731) ===
(Counts of the Holy Roman Empire from 1748, with Royal Licence to use in the UK from 1809. Surname of Fane added in 1809 and 1835).

- Sir Cecil Fane De Salis (1857–1948), KCB, chairman Middlesex County Council (1919–1924).
- Charles de Salis (1736–1781), Count. Unsuccessful candidate for Reading 1761. Died and buried in Hyères.
- Charles Fane de Salis, Bishop of Taunton.
- Rev. Count Henry Jerome de Salis MA, DD, FRS, FSA, (1740–1810), Divine: Rector of St. Antholin and Vicar of Wing, Buckinghamshire.
- Rev. Count Henry Jerome Augustine Fane de Salis, (born Pisa 16.2.1828, died Virginia Water 18.2.1915).
- Jerome, 2nd Count de Salis (1709–1794), FRS, sometime British Resident in the Grisons and a Fellow of the Royal Society.
- Jerome, 4th Count de Salis-Soglio (1771–1836), DL, JP, FRS, Comes SRI, Illustris et Magnificus.
- John, Count de Salis-Soglio-Bondo (1776–1855). Grison statesman, and Minister to Archdukes of Modena.
- John Bernard Philip Humbert de Salis, 9th Count de Salis-Soglio, (1947–2014), TD, ICRC delegate, etc.
- Henry Rodolph de Salis (1866–1936), author Bradshaw's Canals & Navigable Rivers of England & Wales, 1904, 1918 and 1928.
- John Eugène de Salis, 8th Count de Salis-Soglio, Lt. Col. Irish Guards.
- Sir John Francis Charles, 7th Count de Salis-Soglio (1864–1939), KCMG, a British diplomat.
- John Francis William, 6th Count de Salis-Soglio (1825–1871), numismatist and a British diplomat.
- Leopold Fabius Dietegan Fane De Salis (1816–1898), New South Wales politician and Australian pastoralist.
- Peter, 3rd Count de Salis, soldier and landowner. Governor of the Valtelline. Count of the Holy Roman Empire.
- Peter John Fane de Salis, 5th Count de Salis-Soglio, soldier; landowner in counties Limerick and Armagh; Grand Prior of the Venerable Irish Langue of the Order of St. John.
- Count Pierre de Salis (1827–1919), painter and engraver. Curator of Neuchâtel's art museum.
- General Rodolph de Salis, (1811–1880), CB, Colonel of the 8th Hussars.
- Rodolph Fane De Salis (1854–1931). Civil engineer. Chairman of Singer Motor Company, Coventry, and Grand Junction Canal Co.; President of the Canal Association.
- William Andreas Salicus Fane De Salis (1812–1896), a businessman, colonialist, and barrister.
- Admiral Sir William Fane De Salis, KBE, MVO, RN, (1858–1939).
- See Counts de Salis-Soglio.
- See Comtes de Salis-Seewis.

=== Von Salis (Swiss branch) ===
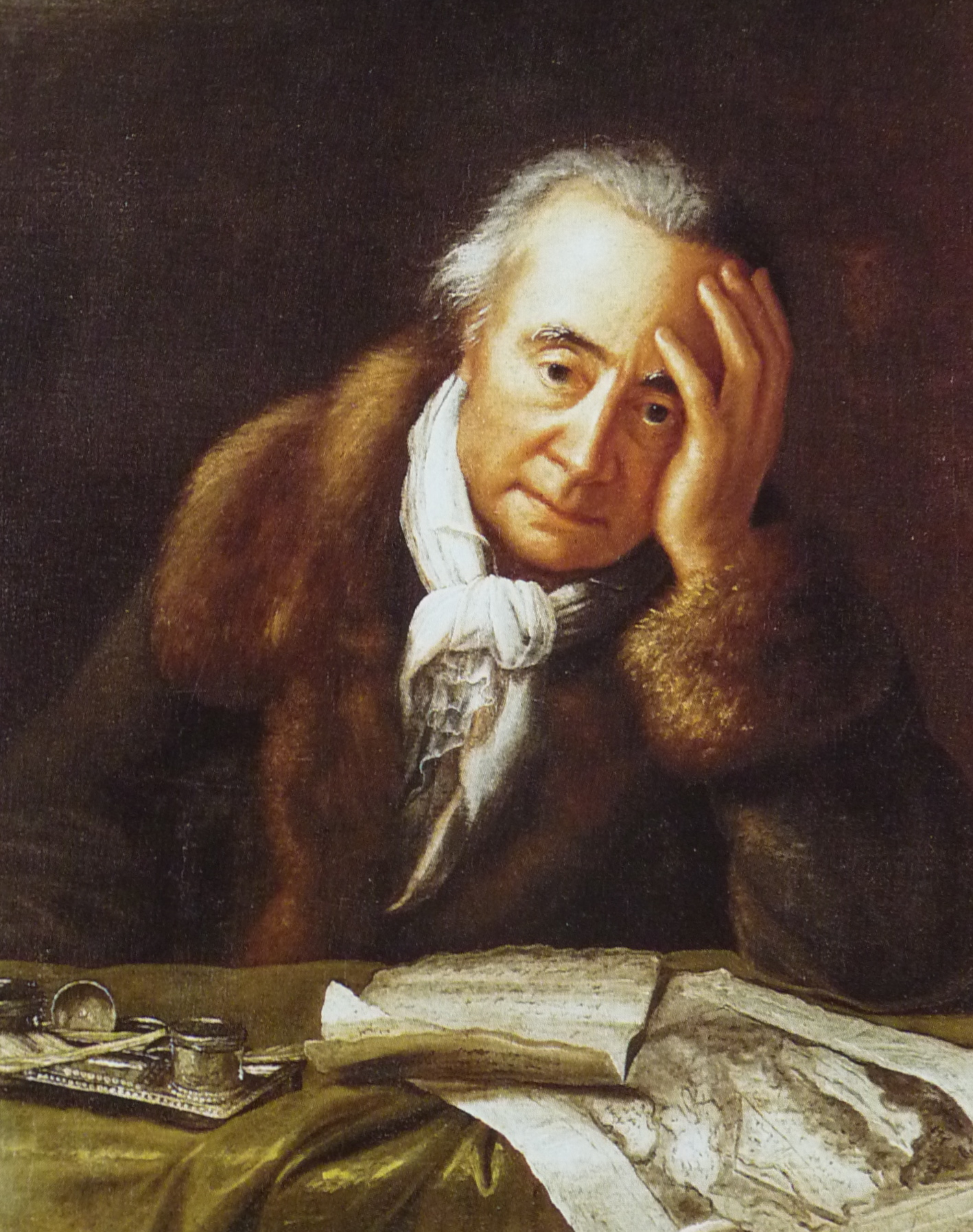
Ulysses von Salis (1728–1800).

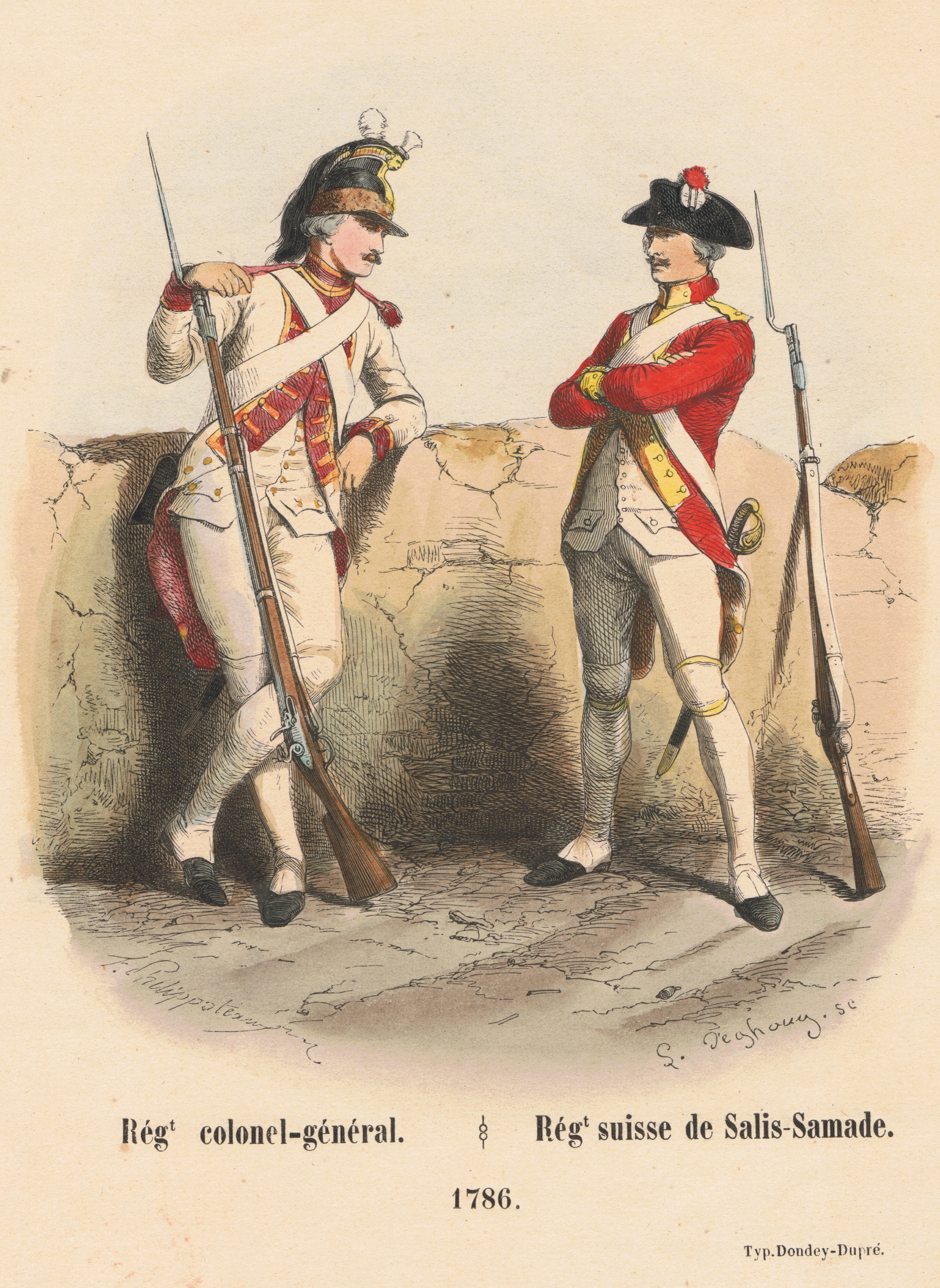
Print after Henri Félix Emmanuel Philippoteaux, of Régiment colonel-général & Régiment suisse de Salis-Samade, 1786.

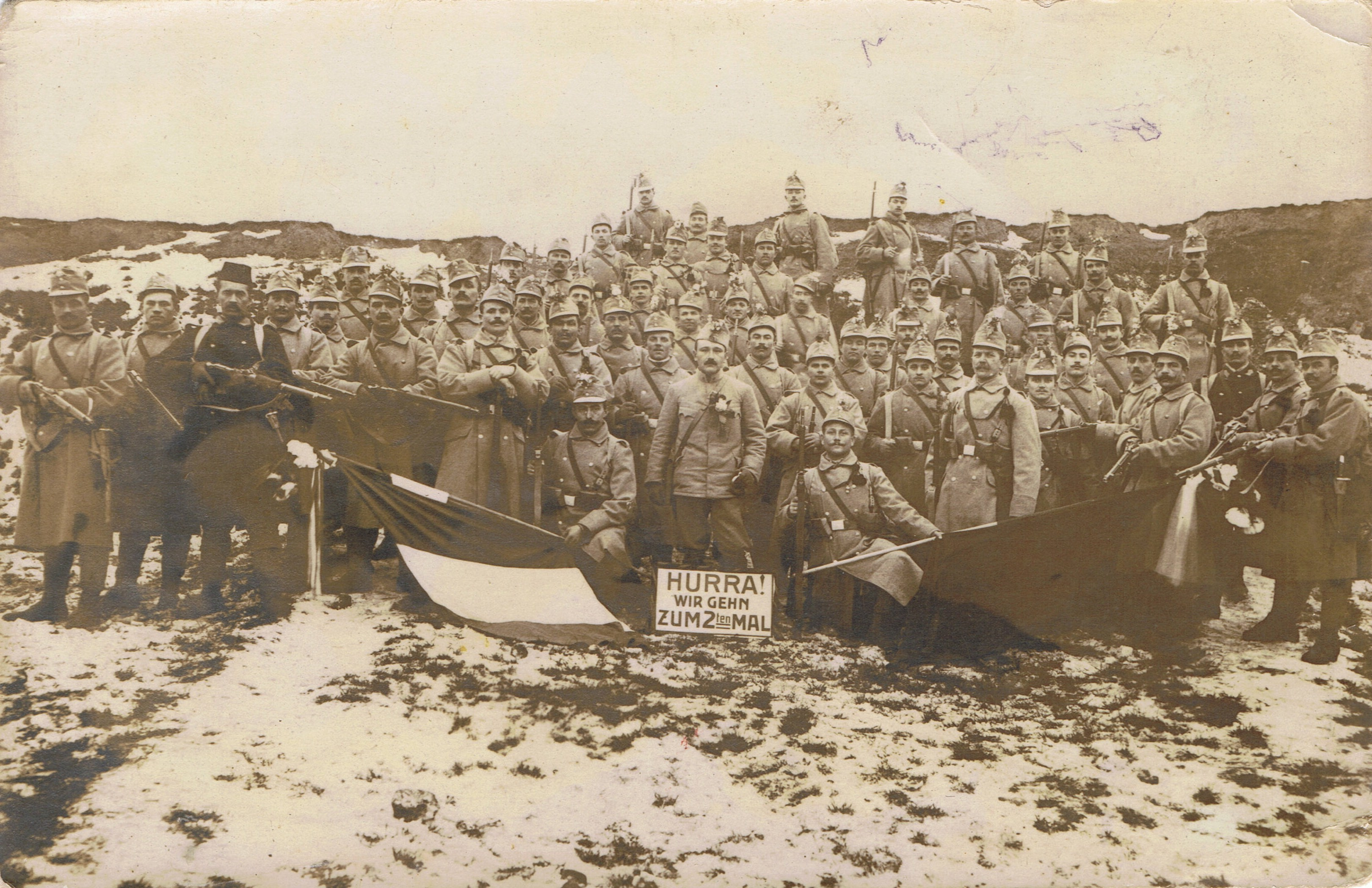
K. u. k. Austro-Hungarian Infantry Regiment Freiherr von Salis Soglio.

- Carl Ulisses von Salis-Marschlins, (1762–1818), was a naturalist.
- Daniel von Salis-Soglio (1826–1919).
- Johann Gaudenz von Salis-Seewis, (1762–1834), poet and lieder writer, soldier-statesman, hereditary French Comte.
- Hortensia von Salis-Maienfeld (1659–1715), Grisons scholar and pre-feminist.
- Meta von Salis-Marschlins (1855–1929), Swiss feminist and historian. Sold Schloss Marschlins.
- Hercules Salis (died 1575) (1500–1575), Grisons politician, governor of the Valtellina.
- Hercules Salis (died 1620) (1566–1620), Grisons politician and military officer, founder of the Salis-Grüsch line.
- Rudolf Salis (1589/90–1625), Grisons officer, general of the Three Leagues in 1622.
- Ulysses Salis (1594–1674), Grisons officer, progenitor of the Salis-Marschlins line.
- Carl Salis (1605–1671), Grisons officer and politician.
- Hercules Salis (died 1727) (1650–1727), Grisons politician, president of the League of God's House.
- Anton von Salis-Soglio (1702–1765), Grisons politician, president of the League of God's House.
- Peter von Salis-Soglio (1675–1749), Grisons envoy and statesman.
- Ulysses von Salis-Marschlins (1728–1800), Grisons statesman.
- Anton von Salis-Marschlins (1732–1812), Grisons officer in French service.
- Simon von Salis-Zizers (1736–1827), Grisons officer in French and Sicilian service.
- Philipp von Boeselager and Georg von Boeselager. Sons of Maria-Theresia (Freiin) von Salis-Soglio (1890–1968) of Schloss Gemünden.

=== Salis ===
- Louis Rodolphe Salis (1851–1897), creator of the Chat Noir in Montmartre. His father came from the Val Bregaglia.
