= Gian Battista Frizzoni =

Swiss minister and hymnist (1727–1800)

Gian Battista Frizzoni (August 27, 1727 – November 29, 1800) was a Swiss Reformed minister and hymnist.

== Life ==
Frizzoni was born on August 27, 1727 in Celerina. He was born to Giovanni Frizzoni, a Reformed minister, and his wife Maria Zuan.

He studied theology in Geneva in 1746 and in Zürich in 1747. He worked as a tutor of the children of the noble von Salis family, where he most likely first became acquainted with Pietism. He was admitted to the synod in 1748 and became a minister to Bondo. Frizzoni served as minister in Bondo until 1758, when his status was revoked on account of his Pietist sympathies.

He returned to Celerina, his hometown, where he served as minister until his death on November 29, 1800. During his time as a minister, he wrote a number of the hymns and composed music for which he is best known.

== Works ==
- Canzuns spirituaelas davart Cristo Gesu, il bun pastur, e deliziusa paschura per sias nuorsas (Celerina 1765)
- Alchunas domandas davart chiossas fondamentaelas in adoever da chi bramma d’esser instruieu nella salüdaivla dottrina de Gesu Cristo (Celerina 1765)
- Compendio di testimoni tratti dalla Scrittura Santa, e da’santi padri e riformatori del vangelica nostra chiesa intorno all'eccellenze, e valore delle salutari passioni, divino sangue e sante piaghe di Gesu Cristo nostro Signore (Chur 1776)
- Sfogo da dolur sopra l’inaspettata mord da sia indementicabla mugleir Barbla Frizzoni, nata Dantz, ed attestat da congiughael amur vers le medesima: rapresentô da sieu afflit e contristô marit (Chur 1783)
- Cantici spirituali che contengono testimonianza dalla redenzione fatta da Gesu Cristo (Vicosoprano 1789)
- Testimoniaunza (1789)
