= Brandis Castle (Lützelflüh) =

Castle in Bern, Switzerland

- Lützelflüh
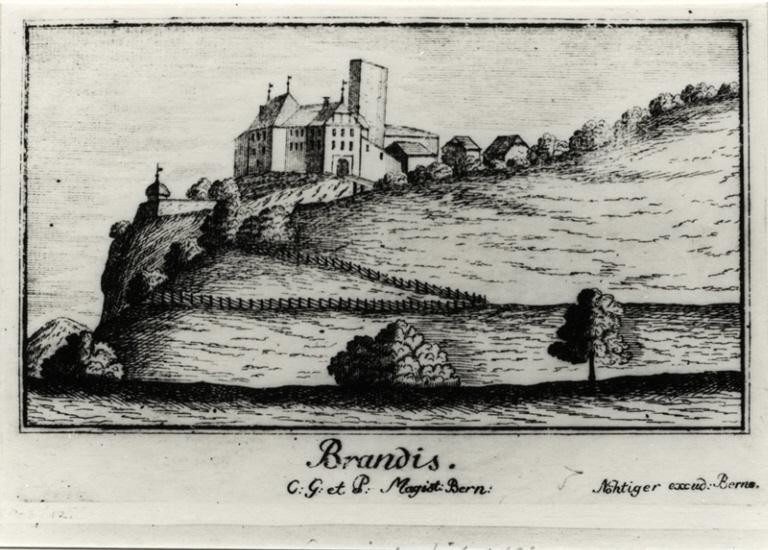
- Burg Brandis, Copperplate engraving by Johann Ludwig Nöthiger, 1743.

Site information
- Type: Hill castle
- Code: CH-BE
- Condition: Ruined, only ditch and wall fragments

Location
- Location within Canton of Bern Location within Switzerland
- Coordinates: 47.012915°N 7.678318°E

Site history
- Built: 13th Century

Garrison information
- Occupants: Freiherren von Brandis

Brandis Castle is the ruin of a hill fort from the 13th century. It stands in the Swiss municipality of Lützelflüh in the Canton of Bern above the village Lützelflüh on a rocky outcrop. Today, only the ruins and the moat are still visible.

== History ==
Brandis castle was built in 1230 as the headquarters of the Freiherr of Brandis. The first known member of the family was Konrad (1239–57). His grandson, Thüring (1280-1324), was involved in the murder of King Albert I by the king's nephew John Parricida in 1308. For this involvement, in 1313 Thüring lost the family estates in Spiez in the Berner Oberland. However, he was supported by Bern and the Counts of Kyburg and retained the Lützelflüh lands.

The castle from the 13th century was from where there was control of their possessions in the upper and middle Emmental. In 1337 the Freiherr of Brandis received Bernese citizenship. By the 15th century, the family owned lands in what is now eastern Switzerland and Vorarlberg. In 1437 Wolfhart V von Brandis inherited Marschlins Castle and the Maienfeld Herrschaft in Graubünden through his wife Verena von Werdenberg-Bludenz. He began selling off the western Brandis lands. In 1455 the family sold the lordship of Brandis in Bern to the Lords of Scharnachthal. Then there were several changes of ownership until the castle, in 1607, came into the possession of the city Bern and a Bernese bailiff was appointed and took up residence in the castle.

During the 1798 French invasion, the castle was burned and almost totally destroyed. It was abandoned and continued to fall into ruin.

== See also ==
- List of castles in Switzerland
