= Heinrich von Salis-Zizers =

Grisons officer (1753–1819)

- Born: 6 May 1753; Zizers, Three Leagues
- Died: 18 May 1819 (aged 66); Helmsdorf (now part of Immenstaad am Bodensee, Baden-Württemberg)
- Resting place: Immenstaad
- Occupation: Military officer
- Parents: Johann Heinrich Anton von Salis-Zizers (father); Maria Anna Franzisca Bessler (mother)
- Relatives: Simon von Salis-Zizers (brother-in-law)

Heinrich von Salis-Zizers (6 May 1753 – 18 May 1819) was a military officer from the Three Leagues, a member of the Salis family. He served in the French Swiss Guards from 1770, took part in the defense of the Tuileries in 1792 and became a lieutenant general in French service in 1816. On 4 January 1814 he led the reactionary putschists in Chur who demanded the separation of the Grisons from Switzerland, and in May 1814 he was commander-in-chief of the failed Grisons military action to reconquer the Valtellina.

== Biography ==
Heinrich von Salis was born on 6 May 1753 in Zizers, the son of Johann Heinrich Anton von Salis-Zizers, a field marshal (Feldmarschall) in French service, and Maria Anna Franzisca Bessler. He was a brother-in-law of Simon von Salis-Zizers. A baron, he remained unmarried. He was the last male member of the baronial branch of the Salis of the Lower Castle (Unteres Schloss) in Zizers, and he owned estates on Lake Constance.

In 1763 his father handed over to him the family's hereditary company (Erbkompanie) in French service. In 1770 Salis joined the Swiss Guards. In 1777 he was a captain of the Guards with the rank of field marshal, and he later became a colonel and a knight of the Order of Saint Louis. In 1792, after the defense of the Tuileries, in which he had taken part, he was dismissed together with his regiment. After the Bourbon Restoration he re-entered French service in 1815, and in 1816 he became lieutenant general and brigade commander (Brigadechef) of the Swiss Guards regiment.

On 4 January 1814 Salis led the reactionary putschists in Chur who demanded the separation of the Grisons from Switzerland and wanted to restore the political system of the Three Leagues. Austria and the other Allies sharply condemned this undertaking. In May 1814 he was commander-in-chief of the failed Grisons military action to reconquer the subject territories of the Valtellina, in which the Salis had lost extensive property. An important and experienced professional soldier from the Grisons, he did not shrink from imposing his restorationist ideas by force.

Salis died on 18 May 1819 in Helmsdorf, now part of the municipality of Immenstaad am Bodensee in Baden-Württemberg, and was buried in Immenstaad.

== Bibliography ==
- A. Maag, Geschichte der Schweizer Truppen in französischen Diensten während der Restauration und der Julirevolution (1816–1830), 1899
- F. Pieth, "Die Zustände in Graubünden 1813/14 in Briefen Ulrich von Plantas an seinen Freund Otto de Carisch", in Bündner Monatsblatt, 1942, 321–340, 365–377

=== Archives ===
- State Archives of the Grisons (Staatsarchiv Graubünden), Chur
