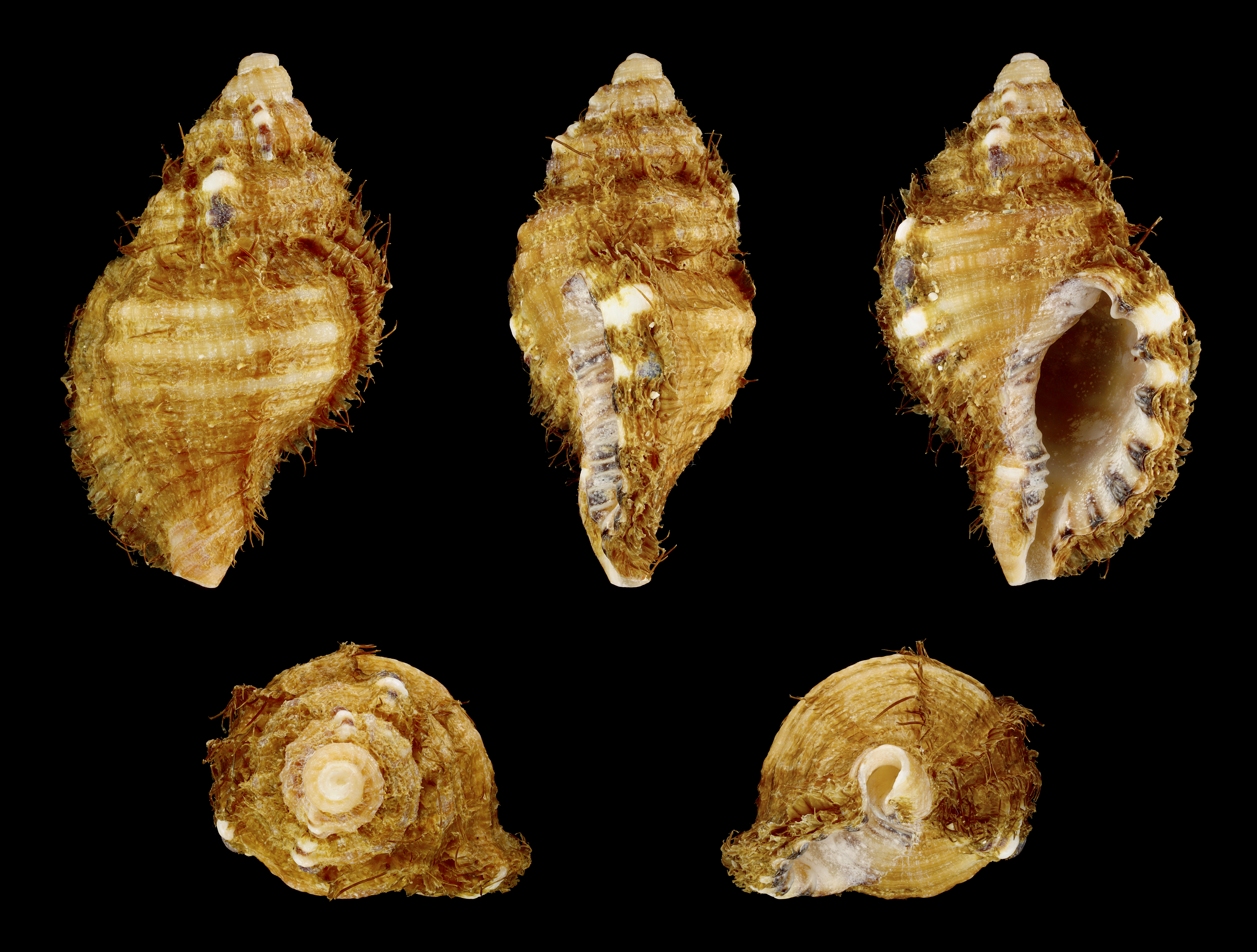
- Apertural view of Monoplex parthenopeus

Conservation status
- Least Concern (IUCN 2.3)

Scientific classification
- Kingdom: Animalia
- Phylum: Mollusca
- Class: Gastropoda
- Subclass: Caenogastropoda
- Order: Littorinimorpha
- Family: Cymatiidae
- Genus: Monoplex
- Species: M. parthenopeus

Binomial name
- Monoplex parthenopeus (Salis-Marschlins, 1793)

Synonyms
- Cymatium (Cabestana) parthenopius (Salis Marschlins, 1793); Cymatium (Cabestana) parthenopius var. robusta Bellatante, 1954; † Cymatium (Linatella) valentinei Olsson & Petit, 1964; Cymatium (Monoplex) echo Kuroda & Habe in Kira, 1961; Cymatium (Monoplex) echo iwakawanum sensu Kuroda & Kira Shikama, 1964; Cymatium (Monoplex) parthenopeum (Salis, 1793); Cymatium (Septa) parthenopeum (Salis Marschlins, 1793); Cymatium echo Kuroda & Habe in Kira, 1961; Cymatium parthenopeum (Von Salis, 1793); Cymatium parthenopeum parthenopeum (Salis Marschlins, 1793); Cymatium (Septa) parthenopeum (Salis Marschlins, 1793); † Cymatium doliarium var. minor Segre, 1952; Cymatium turtoni E. A. Smith, 1890; Dissentoma prima Pilsbry, 1945; Monoplex australasiae Perry, 1811; Murex costatus Born, 1778 (invalid: junior homonym of Murex costatus Pennant, 1777); Murex costulatus Risso, 1826; † Murex doliare Brocchi, 1814; Murex intermedius Brocchi, 1814; Murex parthenopus Salis-Marschlins, 1793; Ranella parthenopaeum (Salis Marschlins, 1793) (incorrect generic placement; incorrect grammatical agreement of species epithet); Ranella pyramidata Risso, 1826; Septa (Monoplex) parthenopea (Salis Marschlins, 1793); Septa (Monoplex) parthenopea echo Beu, 1970; Triton (Monoplex) fossatum Gould, 1860; Triton (Simpulum) acclivis Hutton, 1873; † Triton abbreviatus Bellardi in d'Ancona, 1872; Triton acclivis Hutton, 1873; Triton americanum d'Orbigny, 1842; Triton brasilianum Gould, 1849; Triton fossatum Gould, 1860 (doubtful synonym); † Triton olearium var. escoffierae Fontannes, 1879; Triton parthenopaeum [sic] (misspelling of Triton parthenopeum (Salis Marschlins, 1793)); Triton parthenopaeum var. antupa de Gregorio, 1885; Triton parthenopaeum var. milona de Gregorio, 1884; Triton parthenopaeum var. peribranta de Gregorio, 1884; Triton parthenopaeum var. sbilpa de Gregorio, 1885; Triton parthenopaeum var. stimum de Gregorio, 1885; Triton succinctum Lamarck, 1816; Tritonium hirsutum Franseschini, 1906

= Monoplex parthenopeus =

Monoplex parthenopeus Temporal range: Miocene - Recent

Species of gastropod

Monoplex parthenopeus, the giant triton or giant hairy triton, is a species of sea snail, a marine gastropod mollusk in the family Cymatiidae. It preys on other molluscs.

== Fossil records ==
This species have been recorded as fossils from the Miocene to the Quaternary (from 15.97 to 0.0 million years ago).

== Distribution ==
This species occurs worldwide including:

- The Western Atlantic Ocean
- New Zealand

== Description ==
The maximum recorded shell length is 180 mm.

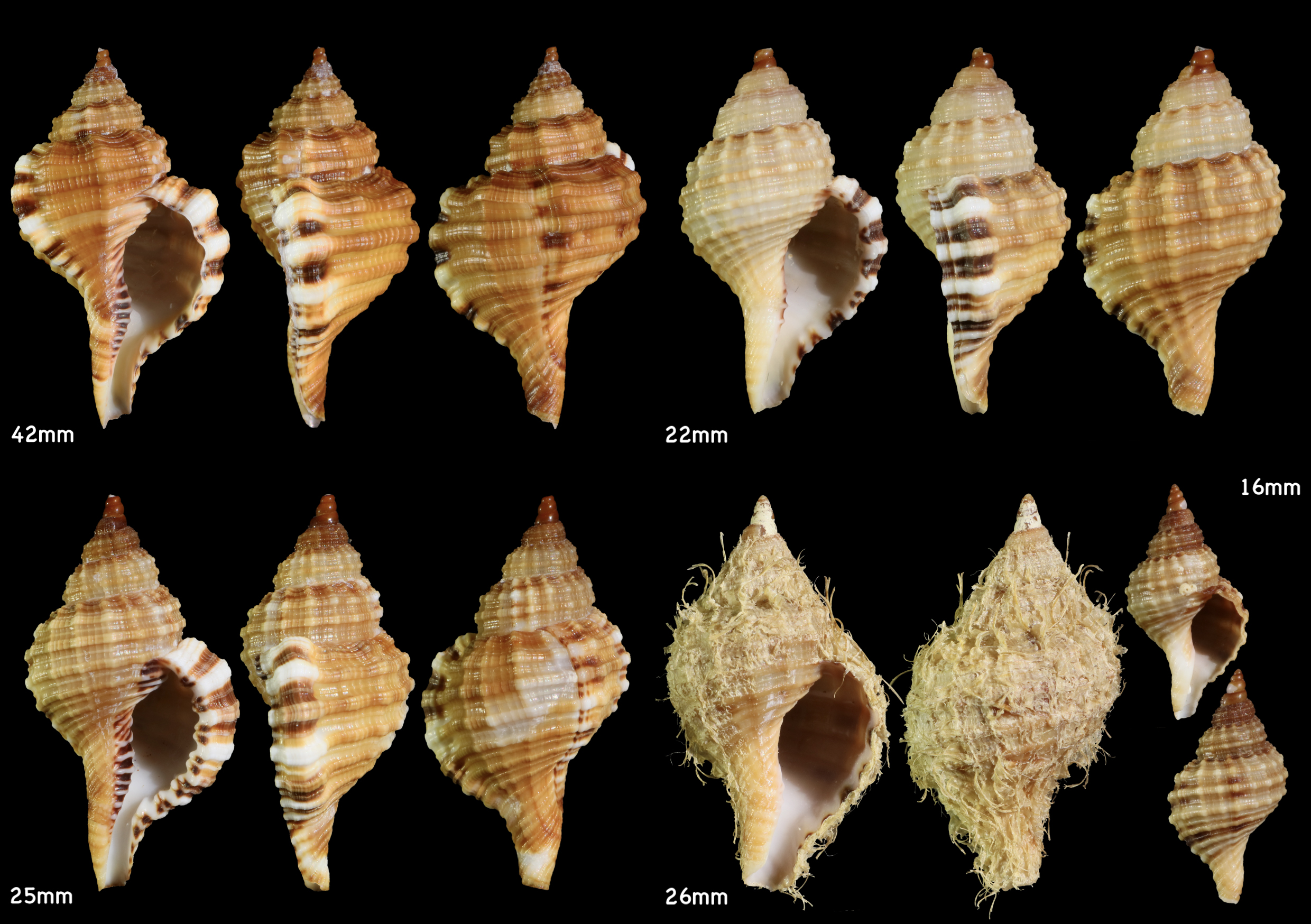
Monoplex parthenopeus (Salis Marschlins, 1793) (d\c) Canary Islands.

== Habitat ==
Trawled 40–60 m. off Akwa Ibom State, Nigeria.

Minimum recorded depth is 0 m. Maximum recorded depth is 75 m.

== Life cycle ==
Hairy tritons are notable for having particularly long planktonic periods. The veliger larvae remain in the plankton for nearly 300 days, dispersing as far as 4000 km. This is the longest known larval duration and dispersal distance of any marine invertebrate which occurs along the west coast of North America.

== Gallery ==
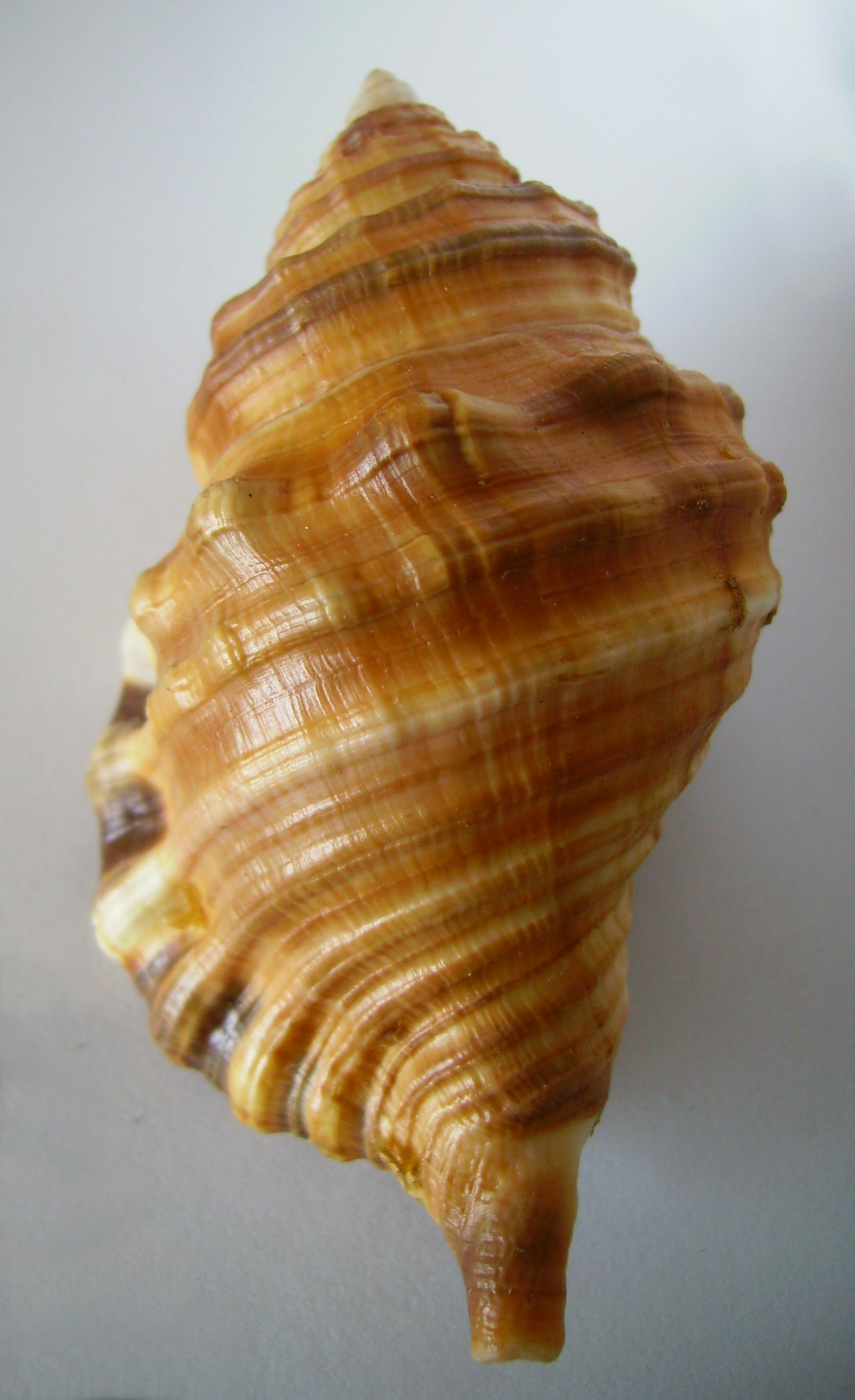
A shell of Monoplex parthenopeus with periostracum removed

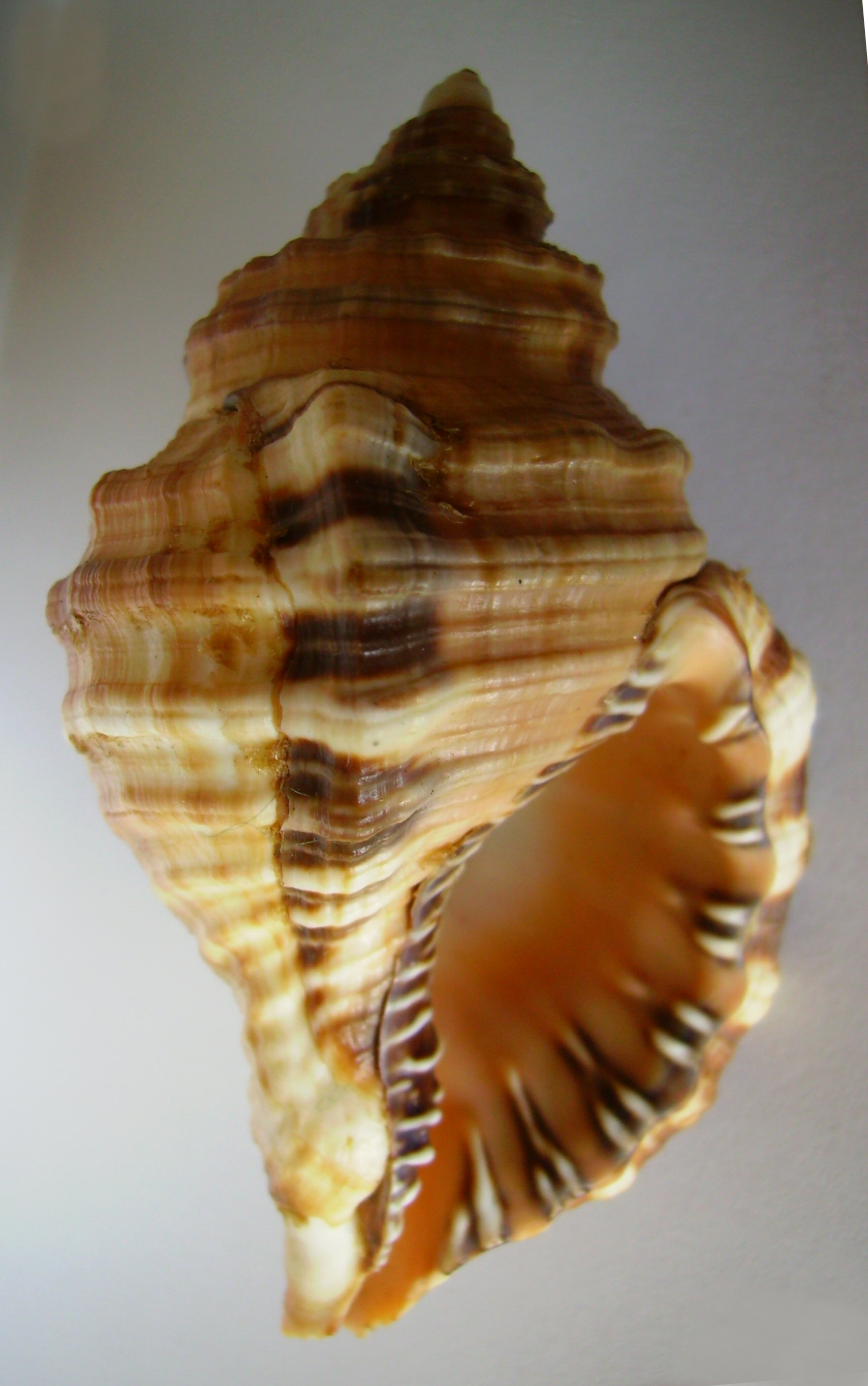
Same shell, apertural view

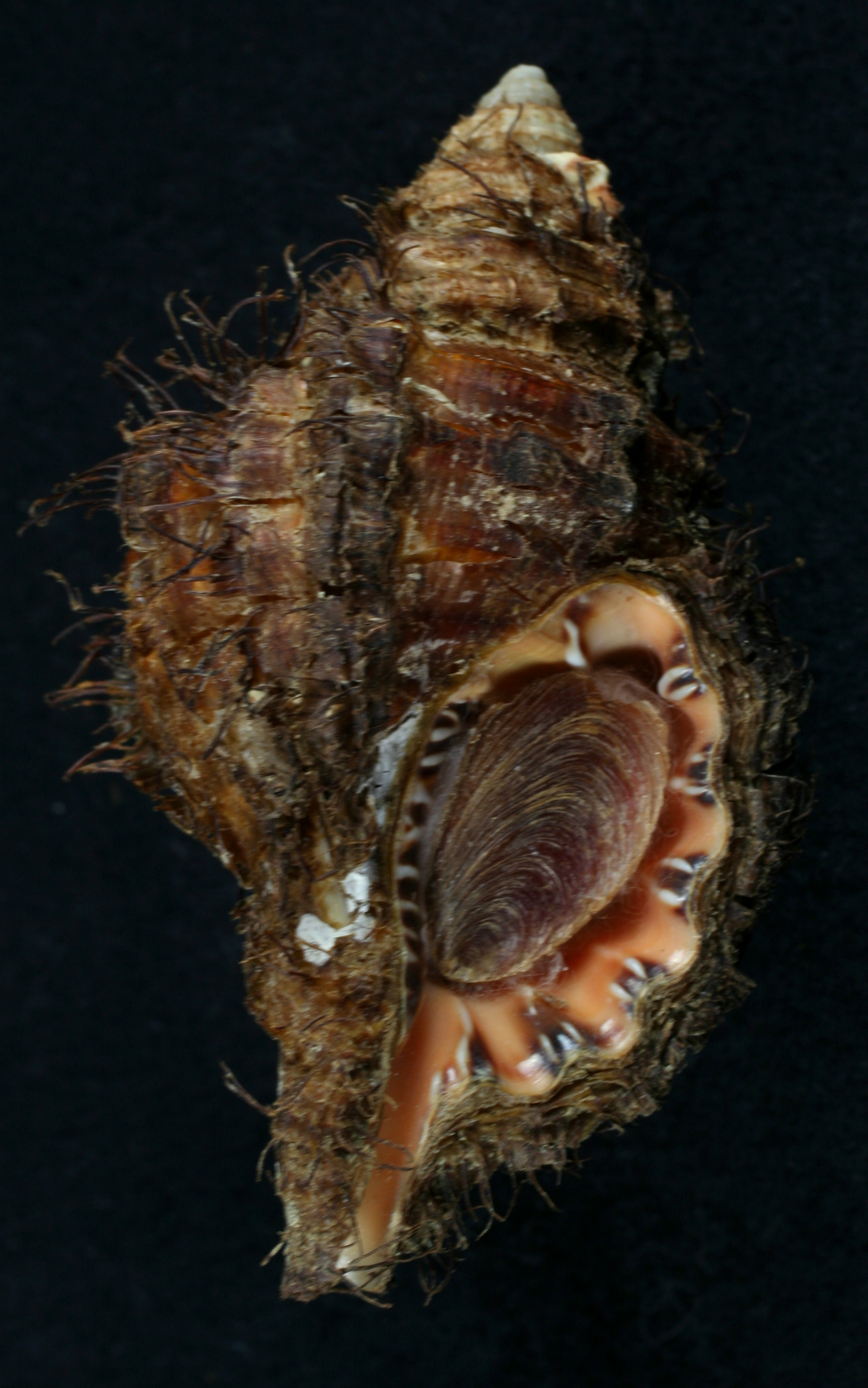
Apertural view of Monoplex parthenopeus echo (Kuroda & Habe in Kira, 1961) with operculum and periostracum attached

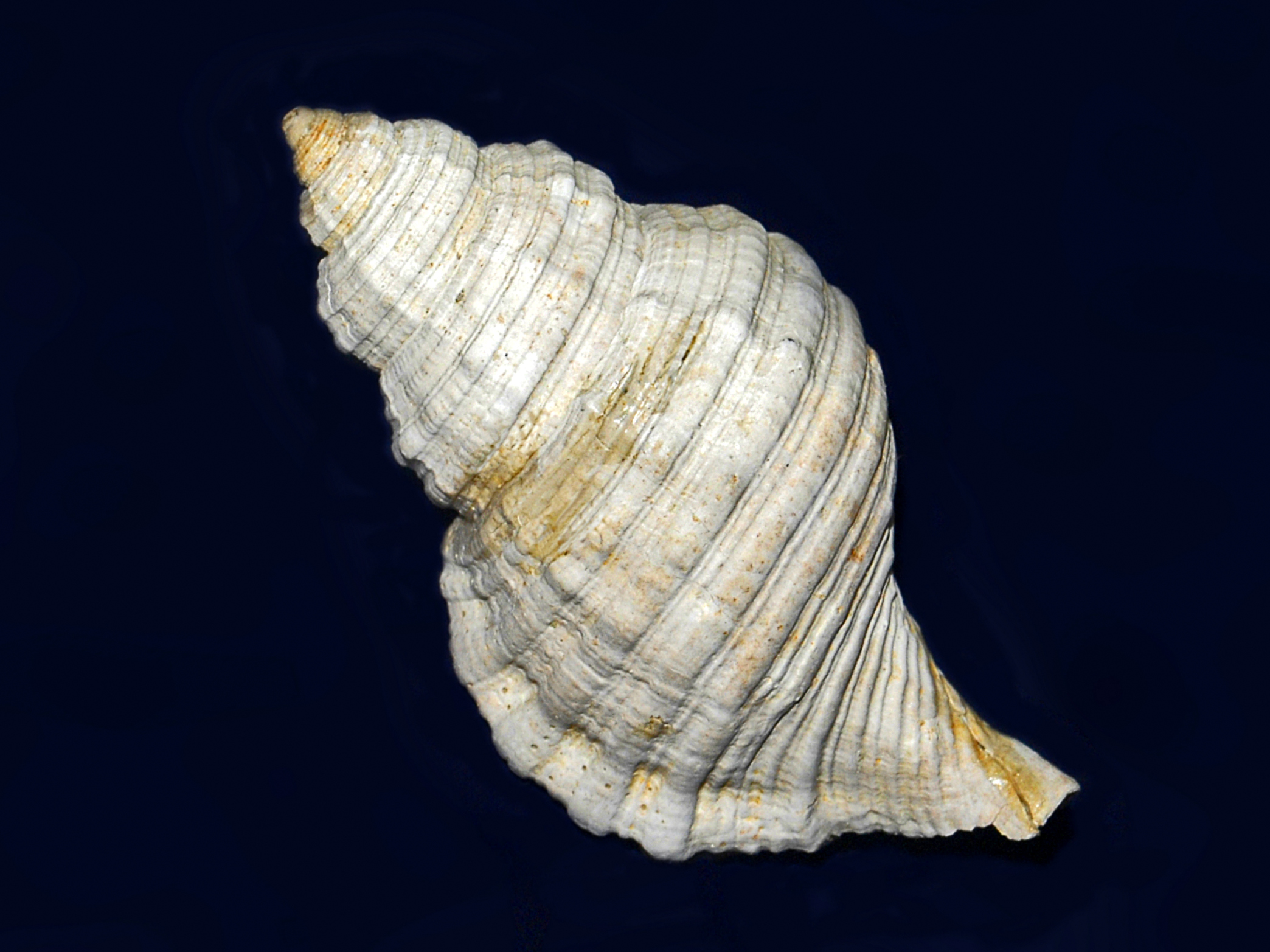
Fossil shell of Monoplex parthenopeus from Pliocene of Italy
