= Rudolf Salis =

Grisons officer (1589/90–1625)

- Born: 1589 or 1590
- Died: 19 October 1625; Malans, Three Leagues
- Occupation: Military officer
- Spouse: Anna von Hartmannis (m. 1611)

Rudolf Salis (1589 or 1590 – 19 October 1625) was a military officer from the Three Leagues. A leading member of the Venetian party, he was a leader of the uprising in the Prättigau against the Austrian occupation army in the spring of 1622, and in June 1622 he became general of the Three Leagues. He then served as a colonel in Venetian and French service.

== Biography ==
Rudolf Salis was the son of Hercules and a brother of Carl and Ulysses. In 1611 he married Anna von Hartmannis, daughter of Hartmann von Hartmannis. In 1606 he studied in Heidelberg, and part of his education took place in France.

Salis was a leading member of the Venetian party. In the spring of 1622 he was a leader of the Prättigau uprising against the Austrian occupation army, and in June 1622 he became general of the Three Leagues. In 1623 he was a colonel in Venetian service, and in 1624–1625 in French service under Marshal François Annibal d'Estrées. After his marriage he lived in the house Zum grünen Turm in Malans. He died in Malans on 19 October 1625.

== Bibliography ==
- A. Pfister, Jörg Jenatsch, 1938 (4th edition 1984)
