= Ulysses von Salis-Marschlins =

Grisons politician (1728–1800)

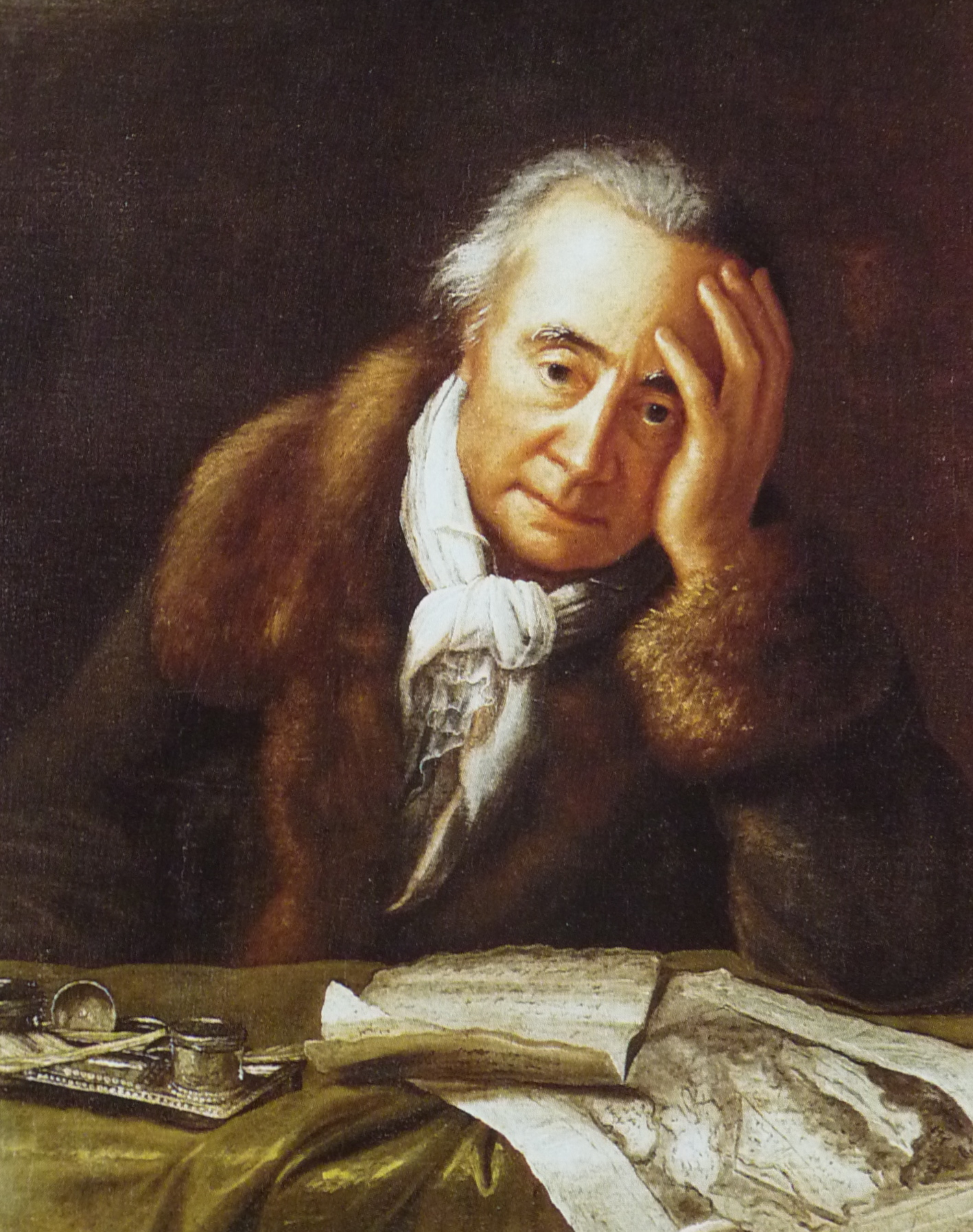
- Portrait by Felix Maria Diogg, 1794
- Born: 25 August 1728; Marschlins Castle, Three Leagues
- Died: 6 October 1800 (aged 72); Vienna, Archduchy of Austria
- Occupations: Politician; diplomat; writer
- Spouse: Barbara Nicola Rosenroll
- Parents: Johann Gubert Rudolf von Salis (father); Perpetua von Salis-Soglio (mother)
- Relatives: Anton von Salis-Marschlins (brother)

Ulysses von Salis-Marschlins (25 August 1728 – 6 October 1800) was a politician, diplomat and writer from the Three Leagues, a member of the Salis family. He was the most influential figure in the Grisons in the second half of the 18th century. From 1768 to 1792 he was the French chargé d'affaires to the Three Leagues, and in 1770–1771 he was president of the Helvetic Society. In 1775 he turned the school at Marschlins Castle into a Philanthropinum, which he had to close in 1777. He was banished in 1794, and in 1799 he fled to Vienna, where he died.

== Biography ==
=== Early life and writings ===
Ulysses von Salis was born on 25 August 1728 at Marschlins Castle, now in the municipality of Landquart, the son of Johann Gubert Rudolf von Salis and Perpetua von Salis-Soglio. His brother was Anton. He married Barbara Nicola Rosenroll, daughter of Rodolph Rosenroll, a vicari, of the forwarding house (Speditionshaus) of Thusis.

Salis spent his youth mainly in Chiavenna and Soglio. After private tuition and educational travels, he studied law at Basel in 1745–1746. In 1755 he began to publish historical, political and economic writings based on aristocratic-patriotic ideas. His legal works were often legal opinions on disputes in the Three Leagues and on the Leagues' sovereign rights in their subject territories (Untertanenlande).

=== Economic and educational reforms ===
After 1759 Salis promoted the introduction of cotton spinning in the putting-out system. This initiative failed, as did silkworm breeding (sericulture) at Marschlins. He was a member of the Helvetic Society and its president in 1770–1771, and he was in close contact with Isaak Iselin and Hans Caspar Hirzel. Salis worked to increase agricultural yields, and in 1778 he co-founded the Society of Agricultural Friends (Gesellschaft landwirtschaftlicher Freunde). At the end of the 1770s he pursued the draining of the marshes near Castione in the Valtellina.

Franz Urs Balthasar had called for a "nursery" (Pflanzschule) for future politicians of both confessions. In this spirit, from 1763 Salis supported the seminary in Haldenstein that Martin von Planta had founded in 1761, and which moved to Marschlins in 1771. After Planta's death Salis temporarily took over its educational direction, and in 1775 he turned the school into a Philanthropinum on the model of Johann Bernhard Basedow. In 1777 he had to close the institution for financial reasons.

=== Political career ===
In 1749 Salis held his first office in the jurisdiction (Gericht) of the Four Villages (Vier Dörfer), where he was later also Landammann. From 1757 to 1759 he was podestà of Tirano. In 1761–1762 he led the embassy for the renewal of the Capitulation of Milan (Mailänder Kapitulat). The agreement favored Austria's transport policy and the Salis, who owned property in the Valtellina, but it strengthened the opposition to the family's dynastic power politics (Hausmachtpolitik). The family's interests prevailed in the Tomils affair (Tomilserhandel) of 1766.

In 1768, to the irritation of the established French partisans, Salis obtained his appointment as French chargé d'affaires to the Three Leagues; he was usually called "minister". From 1771 to 1775, against Austrian interests, he thwarted the road project from Chiavenna to Nauders of his main opponent, Peter Conradin Constantin von Planta. In 1792, probably at the instigation of the Grisons opposition party, the reform-minded Patriots (Patrioten), he lost the post of chargé d'affaires, as well as the company of which he was the proprietor (Inhaber).

=== Banishment ===
In 1794 Salis was summoned before the assembly of the Leagues (Standesversammlung). He fled, and the "Impartial Court" (Unparteiisches Gericht) banished him as an outlaw. The annexation of the Valtellina to the Cisalpine Republic in 1797 cost him heavy losses. From his country estate of Eckbühl near Höngg he agitated against the Patriots and against the Grisons joining the Helvetic Republic. In September 1799 he fled to St. Gallen and then on to Vienna. He died in Vienna on 6 October 1800.

=== Assessment ===
Salis was the most influential figure in the Grisons in the second half of the 18th century. As a man of the Enlightenment in the spirit of aristocratic patriotism, he worked for reform in journalism, the economy and education. Alongside his lofty idealism stood his activity as a practical politician (Realpolitiker). A virtuoso diplomat, he brought about the Third Capitulation of Milan with Austria, only to curb Austria's influence shortly afterwards by turning to France. Of equal importance to him was the strengthening of the house of Salis. The opposition to this "family rule" (Familienherrschaft), which arose in the 1760s, prevailed only in the wake of the revolutionary events that drove Salis into the Austrian camp.

== Works ==
- Fragmente der Staats-Geschichte des Thals Veltlin und der Grafschaften Clefen und Worms, aus Urkunden, 4 vols., 1792
- Bildergallerie der Heimweh-Kranken, 3 vols., 1798–1803 (3rd edition 1823–1827)

== Bibliography ==
- A. Rufer, "Ulysses von Salis-Marschlins", in Das Ende des Freistaates der Drei Bünde, 1965, 1–23
- Bedeutende Bündner aus fünf Jahrhunderten, 1, 1970, 303–315
- P. Metz, Ulysses von Salis-Marschlins, 2000
- R. Theus Baldassarre, "Diplomatie und Aufklärung: Ulysses von Salis-Marschlins", in Bündner Monatsblatt, 2001, 8–33
