= Carl Salis =

Grisons politician (1605–1671)

- Born: 5 August 1605
- Died: 13 September 1671 (aged 66); Maienfeld, Three Leagues
- Occupations: Military officer; politician
- Spouse: Hortensia Gugelberg von Moos (m. 1634)

Carl Salis (5 August 1605 – 13 September 1671) was an officer and politician from the Three Leagues. He was a captain in the French guard, commander of Chiavenna in 1637, Bundslandammann (head) of the League of the Ten Jurisdictions in 1656, and town bailiff of Maienfeld. Around 1645 he had the house Oberer Spaniöl built in Chur.

== Biography ==
Carl Salis was the son of Hercules and a brother of Rudolf and Ulysses. In 1634 he married Hortensia Gugelberg von Moos, daughter of Johann Luzi Gugelberg von Moos and widow of Hartmann Dietegen von Salis.

In 1625 Salis was a captain in the French guard, in 1637 commander of Chiavenna, in 1656 Bundslandammann of the League of the Ten Jurisdictions, and in 1662 and 1665 town bailiff (Stadtvogt) of Maienfeld. In connection with his marriage he moved into the house in Maienfeld later known as the Marschallhaus (marshal's house). Around 1645 he had the stately house Oberer Spaniöl built in Chur. He died in Maienfeld on 13 September 1671.
