= Von Ott family =

Swiss family from Grüsch and Schiers

von Ott
- Current region: Grisons, Switzerland
- Origin: Probably Davos
- Founded: Early 16th century
- Estates: Grüsch, Schiers

The von Ott family was a family established from the early 16th century in Grüsch and Schiers, probably originating from Davos.

From 1544 onward, the Otts competed with the Aliesch family of Schiers for the office of representative of the cathedral chapter of Chur (Kapitelammann) in the Lower Prättigau. Even after the integration of the chapter jurisdiction of Chur (Kapitelgericht) into that of Schiers between 1556 and 1566, the Otts often still appeared as mayors of the chapter of Chur at Schiers. In 1677 they bought from the cathedral chapter all the property and Alpine rights attached to this mayoralty.

== Alliances and political stance ==
The Otts concluded alliances with the leading families of Grüsch and of the League of the Ten Jurisdictions (Finer, Enderlin, Guler, Buol, Sprecher). Their social position was confirmed in 1588, when Hercules Salis of Soglio married a von Ott and had a house called the Grosshaus built on his wife's estate at Grüsch. The manor houses of the Salis and the Otts have since strongly marked the townscape of Grüsch. Unlike the Salis, who supported French interests within the Three Leagues, the Otts represented the Spanish, and later Austrian, party. Their power, however, remained mainly local, and their influence was limited within both the League of the Ten Jurisdictions and the Three Leagues.

The family produced numerous landammans of Schiers, but only three of the League of the Ten Jurisdictions and a single administrator of the subject lands of the Grisons (until 1797).

== Later history ==
In the 19th century, some members of the family became entrepreneurs or emigrated.

The family seat at Grüsch (Zum Rosengarten, named after the restaurant established in the house in 1871) has since 1979 belonged to a foundation that runs a cultural center housing the local museum, archives, and a small theater.

== Bibliography ==
- C. Jecklin, "Das Chorherrengericht zu Schiers", in Jahresbericht der Historisch-antiquarischen Gesellschaft von Graubünden, 49, 1919, pp. 8, 18, 22, 24, 41–47.
- P. Gillardon, Geschichte des Zehngerichtenbundes, 1936, pp. 194, 223.
- P. Fravi, "Das Herrennest Grüsch und sein Haus zum Rosengarten", in Bündner Kalender, 144, 1985, pp. 73–79.
- S. Niggli, Die Grüscher Adeligen und ihre Häuser, 1992.
