= Carl Ulisses von Salis-Marschlins =

Swiss naturalist and jurist

Carl Ulisses von Salis-Marschlins Count of the Holy Roman Empire
- Born: 28 September 1760; Marschlins, Switzerland
- Died: 16 January 1818 (aged 57); Marschlins, Switzerland
- Other names: Karl Ulisses von Salis-Marschlins; Charles Ulisses von Salis-Marschlins
- Education: Jena, Dijon
- Known for: Reisen in verscheidene Provinzen des Königreichs Neapel (Travels through various provinces of the Kingdom of Naples)
- Scientific career
- Fields: Botany, entomology, conchology

Carl Ulisses von Salis-Marschlins or Karl or Charles (28 September 1760 in Marschlins – 16 January 1818) was a Swiss naturalist interested in botany, entomology, and conchology.

== Biography ==
Born into the Swiss nobility, a member of Salis family, he held the title of Count of the Holy Roman Empire. His first studies were in Jena then at the Academy in Dijon. He was a Jurist. During the War of the Second Coalition he was held hostage in Salins-les-Bains 1799–1800 and later in St. Gallen (1801).

== Career ==
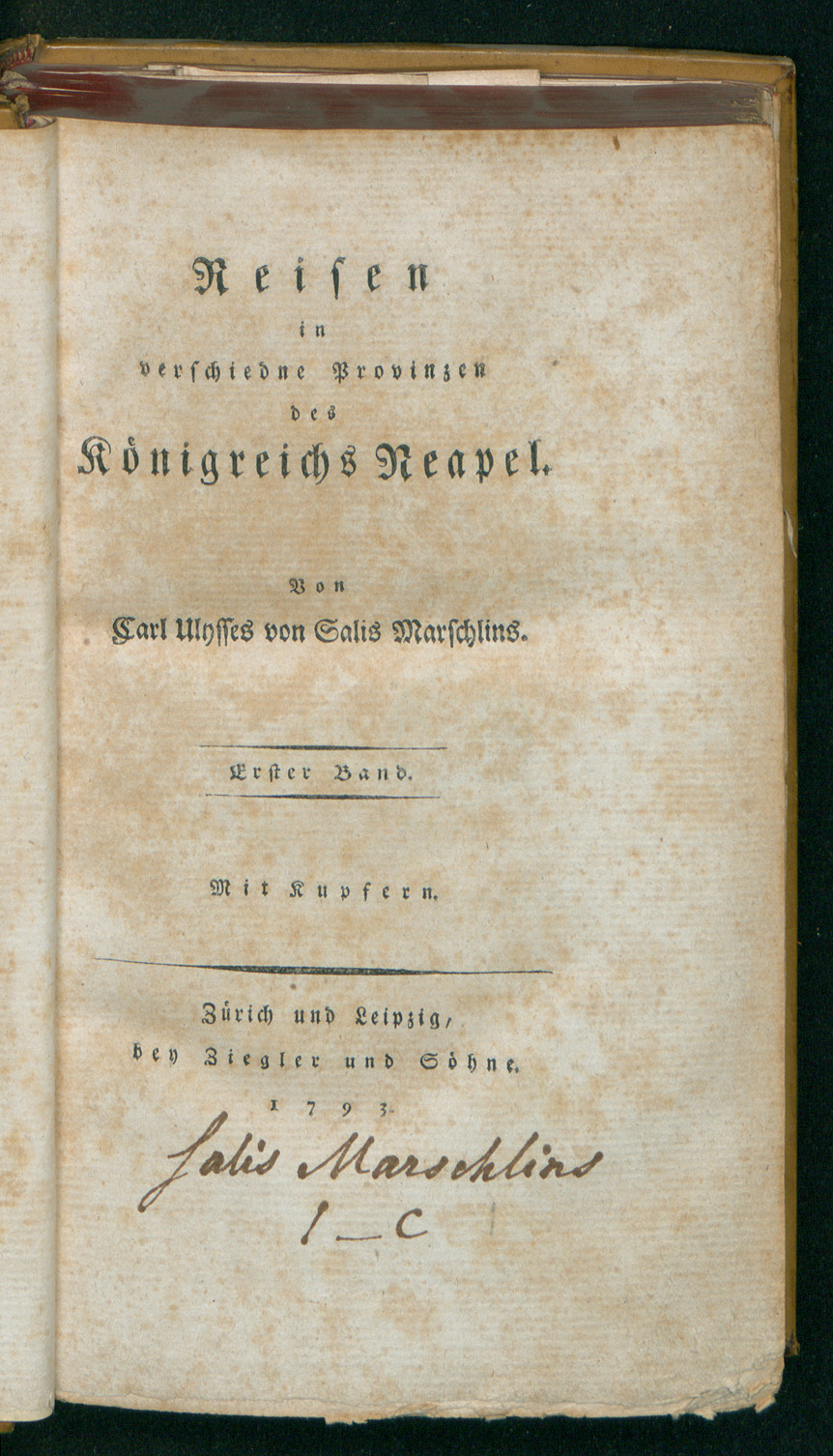
Reisen in verschiedene provinzen des Königreichs Neapel, 1793

Aside from Natural Sciences von Salis was also interested in agriculture, history and education and maintained contacts with researchers from abroad. He traveled often and wrote about his trip to Sicily and Naples in 1788–89. He described in detail the specifics of irrigation of the French Jura mountains.

He wrote Reisen in verscheidene Provinzen des Königreichs Neapel, Travels through various provinces of the Kingdom of Naples (Zürich & Leipzig, 1793), Beitrage zur natürliche und ökonomie Kenntniss des Königreichs beeder Sicilien, 1790 and Streifereyen durch den franzische Jura während den Jahren 1799 und 1800, 1805. He edited and wrote for three journals :Der Sammler (Collector), Der neue Sammler (New Collector) (1806–1809) and Zeitschrift "Alpina".

Species described by von Salis include: Monoplex parthenopeus, Gibbula ardens, Patella tarentina, Conus jaspis and Euphorbia gayi. Johann Coaz honoured his name in Larix × marschlinsii Coaz (1917) - a hybrid name.
