= Simon von Salis-Zizers =

Grisons officer (1736–1827)

- Born: 24 September 1736
- Died: August 1827; Chieti, Abruzzo
- Occupation: Military officer
- Spouse: Maria Josepha von Salis-Zizers
- Parents: Rudolf Franz von Salis (father); Anna Elisabeth von Buol-Rietberg (mother)
- Relatives: Heinrich von Salis-Zizers (brother-in-law)

Simon von Salis-Zizers (24 September 1736 – August 1827) was a military officer from the Three Leagues, a member of the Salis family. He entered French service as a cadet in 1752, and after 1790 he was a field marshal in Sicilian service.

== Biography ==
Simon von Salis was born on 24 September 1736, the son of Rudolf Franz von Salis, a colonel, and Anna Elisabeth von Buol-Rietberg. He married Maria Josepha, née von Salis-Zizers, daughter of Johann Heinrich Anton von Salis-Zizers, a field marshal (Feldmarschall) in French service. He was a brother-in-law of Heinrich von Salis-Zizers.

In 1752 Salis became a cadet in French service in the Salis regiment (Regiment von Salis), and in 1756 a captain and the proprietor (Inhaber) of a company. In 1775 he became a major and sold his company. In 1789 he became a colonel and the proprietor of a half-company in the Tschudy regiment, and after 1790 he was a field marshal in Sicilian service. He was one of about 30 members of the Salis family who had reached the rank of general by the end of the 18th century.

Salis died in August 1827 in Chieti, in the Abruzzo.

== Bibliography ==
- Anton von Sprecher, Stammbaum der Familie von Salis, 1941, plates 17/82 and 17/65

=== Archives ===
- Bibliothek am Guisanplatz (BiG), Bern, Schafroth collection (Sammlung Schafroth)
