= Anton von Salis-Marschlins =

Grisons officer (1732–1812)

- Born: 24 February 1732; Marschlins Castle, Three Leagues
- Died: 17 November 1812 (aged 80); Erlenbach, Zurich, Switzerland
- Occupation: Military officer
- Spouses: Cornelia Alida von Leiden (m. 1758) Friederike Louise von Trützschler (m. 1794)
- Parents: Johann Gubert Rudolf von Salis (father); Perpetua von Salis-Soglio (mother)
- Relatives: Ulysses von Salis-Marschlins (brother)

Anton von Salis-Marschlins (24 February 1732 – 17 November 1812) was a military officer from the Three Leagues, a member of the Salis family. In French service he became inspector general of all Swiss and Grisons infantry regiments in 1770 and maréchal de camp in 1780. In 1787 he became inspector and lieutenant general of the King of Sicily.

== Biography ==
Anton von Salis was born on 24 February 1732 at Marschlins Castle, now in the municipality of Landquart, the son of Johann Gubert Rudolf von Salis and Perpetua von Salis-Soglio. His brother was Ulysses. In 1758 he married Countess Cornelia Alida von Leiden, from Batavia (now Jakarta). In 1794 he married Friederike Louise von Trützschler, the widow of Brigadier General Johann Ulrich von Orelli.

Salis made his military career in French service. In 1749 he became sous-aide-major and captain of the half-company that his father had raised for him in 1734. He became a major in 1757, and in 1762 a colonel and the proprietor (Inhaber) of a Grisons regiment. In 1768 he was promoted to brigadier, in 1770 he became inspector general of all Swiss and Grisons infantry regiments, and in 1780 maréchal de camp. In 1783 he received the military cross of merit. In 1787 he became inspector and lieutenant general of the King of Sicily. He was one of about 30 members of the Salis family who had reached the rank of general by the end of the 18th century.

In 1793 Salis acquired the Erlengut estate in Erlenbach. He died in Erlenbach on 17 November 1812.

== Bibliography ==
- Anton von Sprecher, Stammbaum der Familie von Salis (text volume), typescript, 1941 (Staatsarchiv Graubünden)
- K. Kuprecht, "General Anton von Salis-Marschlins", in Bündner Monatsblatt, 1962, 26–47
