= Marschlins Castle =

- Landquart
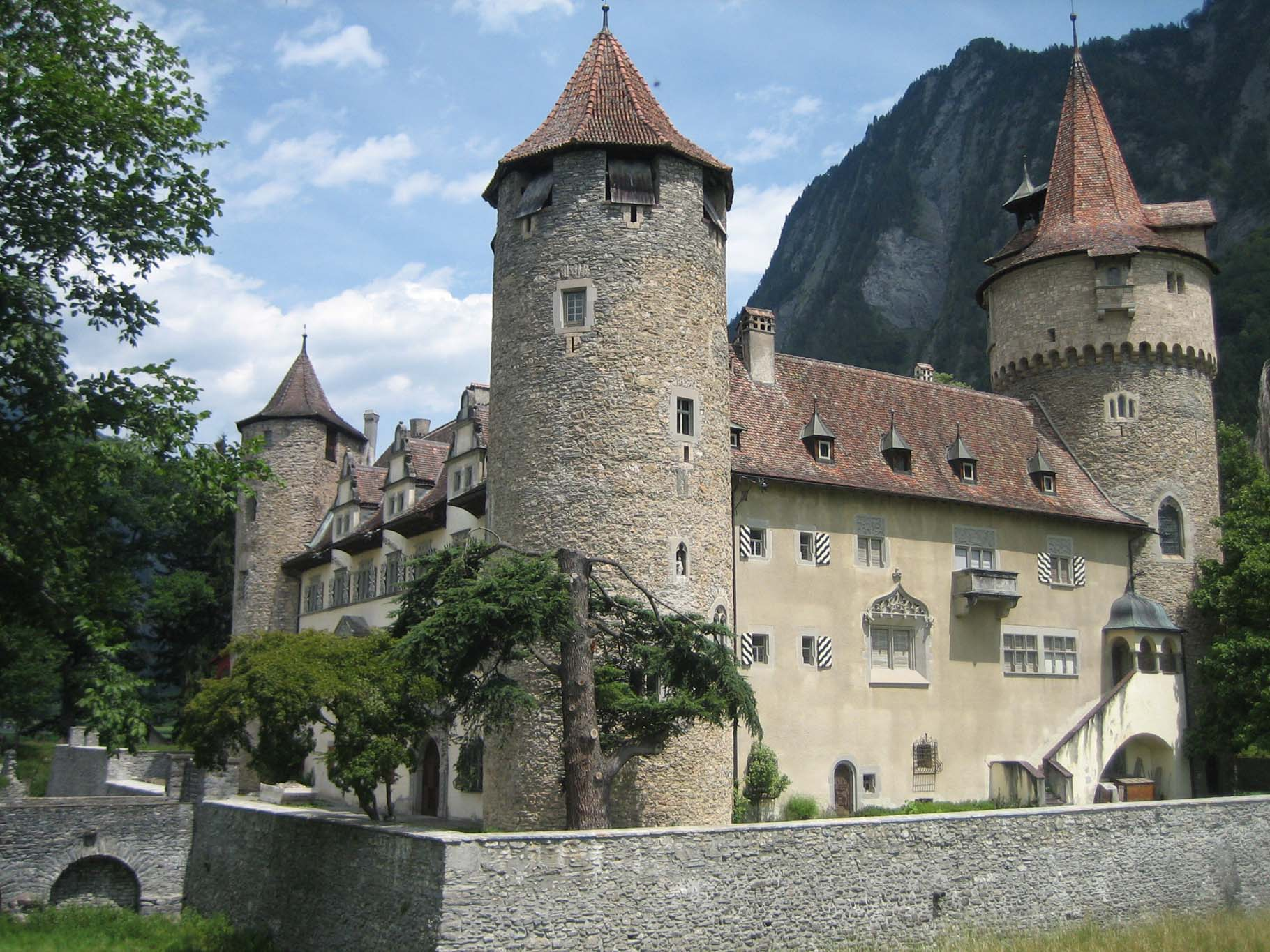
- Marschlins Castle

Site information
- Type: water castle
- Code: CH-GR
- Condition: privately owned

Location
- Location within Canton of Graubünden Location within Switzerland
- Coordinates: 46°57′16.36″N 09°35′4.14″E

Site history
- Built: 13th century

Garrison information
- Occupants: Bishop of Chur

Marschlins Castle is a castle in the village of Igis of the municipality of Landquart of the Canton of Graubünden in Switzerland. It is a Swiss heritage site of national significance.

Marschlins Castle was the childhood home of feminist Meta von Salis.

== History ==
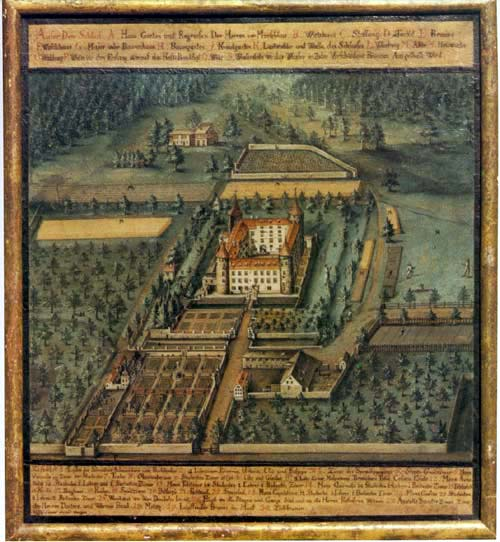
The castle in 1775

The castle was built in the 13th century, though there may have been 11th- or 12th-century castles on the site and local legend claims it dates back to the Carolingian era. However, the 13th-century castle was probably built for the bishop of Chur. The castle is built in the Savoyard style, a square castle with corner towers, one of which is enlarged to serve as the donjon. This style of castle is unique in Graubünden, and how the design was imported is unknown. One theory for a Savoy connection is that between 1233 and 1237 the bishop of Chur was Ulrich IV of Kyburg, whose brother Hartmann IV was married to Margarethe of Savoy.

The castle was first mentioned on 12 May 1324 as the death place of the knight Jacob von Marmels. In 1336 the Bishop and Count Ulrich von Montfort were quarreling over the castle, which was decided by the courts in the Bishop's favor. However, in the following year he granted the castle as a fief to Duke Albert II of Austria. The Austrian duke granted it to several of his knights, until on 3 October 1354 it was granted to the Counts of Toggenburg in exchange for their support against Zürich and the Old Swiss Confederation. After the death of the last Count of Toggenburg, Frederick VII, in 1436 the fief passed back to the Austrians who granted it to the Brandis family to hold for the Bishop of Chur. In 1442 they used the castle as collateral for a loan from Heinrich von Sigberg. In 1460 the castle was partly destroyed in a fire. Because of the complex ownership (owned by the Bishop of Chur, granted as a fief to the Brandis family, collateral to the Sigberg family), a quarrel broke out between the Brandis and Sigberg families over the cost of repairs. A mediator from the Three Leagues determined that the Brandis family needed to repay the loan and that the repair costs would be shared equally.

In 1462 the Duke of Austria acquired the castle and estates from the Bishop of Chur and sold it to Ulrich von Brandis, who began rebuilding. In 1467 the duke expanded the estates attached to Marschlins by adding Malans, Untervaz and Valzeina. In 1498 the Brandis family began trying to sell the castle and estates, but the outbreak of the Swabian War in the following year broke the deal. After the war, in 1509, they pawned the castle to Ulrich Goeldin and in 1518 the Gugelberg family bought it outright. Around 1600 the moat was drained.

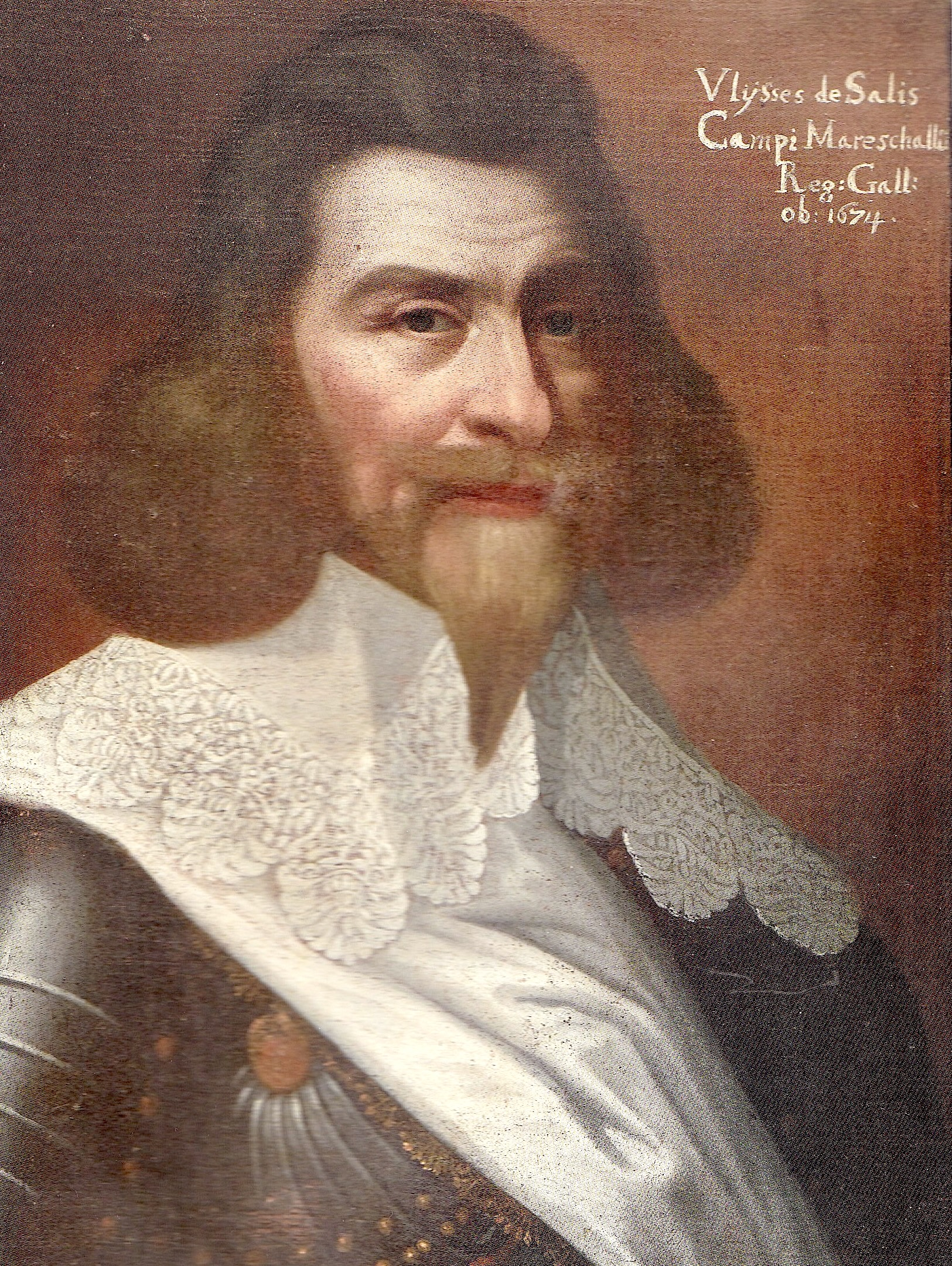
Ulysses von Salis (1594–1674)

In 1633 the rather dilapidated structure was acquired by Ulysses von Salis, a member of the Salis-Soglio family, who adopted the name Salis-Marschlins. He had made his fortune as a French Maréchal de camp. Two years later he began renovating the castle and turned it from a more military fortification into an elegant house with a french garden. In 1771 the bell tower on the chapel was added. From 1771 until 1777 the castle became a philanthropinist school. Later, it was a tobacco factory and a silk spinning mill. After the French invasion of Switzerland the castle became an army camp. A total of about 10,000 soldiers and 3,000 horse passed through the castle between March 1799 and December 1800.

In 1905 the Salis family had the castle rebuilt under the guidance of the architect Eugen Probst. Probst, the controversial founder of the Schweizerischer Burgenverein, made little effort to preserve the historic structures or preserve the medieval appearance of Marschlins. An additional floor was added to the tower and many new windows were added. After the death of Meta von Salis-Marschlins, the last offspring of her branch, the castle was inherited by the Maienfeld branch of the Salis family who sold it in 1934. Today the castle is still privately owned.

== Castle site ==
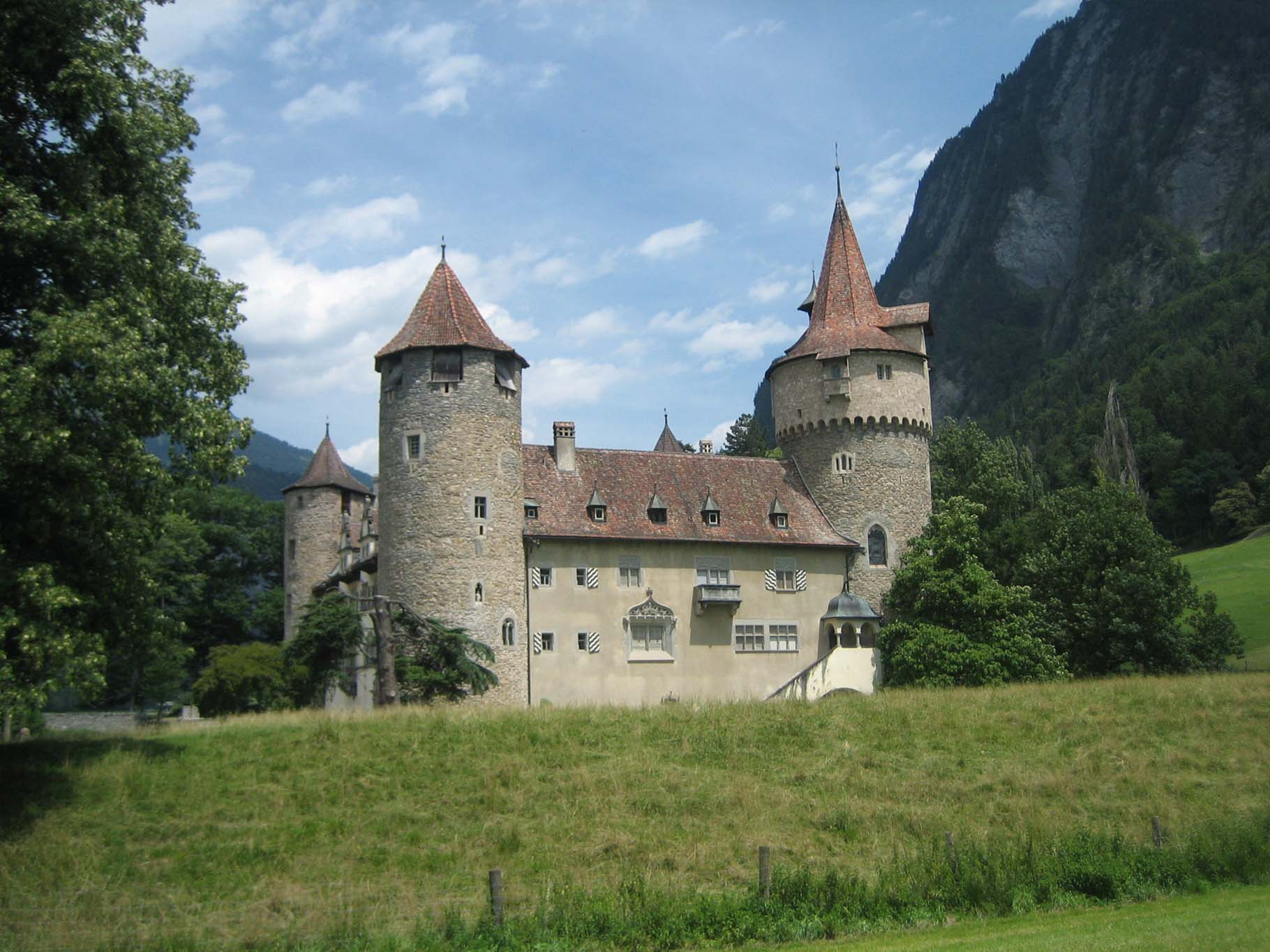
Marschlins Castle with the nearby cliff in background

The castle is located about 1 kilometer (0.62 mi) north-east of Igis village, on a flat plain but about 250 m (820 ft) from a steep cliff. The castle is surrounded by two moats which were filled with water during the Middle Ages. Originally the moats were spanned with a drawbridge, which was replaced with a stone bridge in the 17th century. It is rectangular and about 34 m × 39 m (112 ft × 128 ft) in size. Each corner has a round tower with the 11 m (36 ft) in diameter south tower being the largest and main tower. The other three towers are 8.7 m (29 ft) in diameter. The oldest residence building in the castle is on the north side. The current triumphal arch like gate is in the center of the western wall, but was originally further south. In the courtyard is a cannon from the Salis regiment from 1676.

There are three highly decorated, 17th century furnished rooms in the castle. The Marschallstübli was built around 1633 and features richly carved paneling with inlaid marquetry and a carved wooden coffered ceiling. The cocklestove was built in 1638 by the Pfau workshop and the cabinets decorated with the alliance arms of Heinrich Hirzel-Yolanda von Salis are from 1674. The Offiziersstube was completed in 1638 and is paneled in stone pine. The coffered ceiling is decorated with a carved Salis coat of arms. A Steckborn oven from the first half of the 18th century warmed the room. The third room, the Goldene Stübli in the north-east tower was completed around 1670. The carved paneling is painted with hunting scenes. The coffered roof is decorated with 43 constellations and the four winds. The room is decorated with a collection of gothic sculptures. The chapel was built in the main tower in 1771. The interior is decorated with paintings of the Four Evangelists from the mid-17th century and with stained glass from the same era.

== Gallery ==
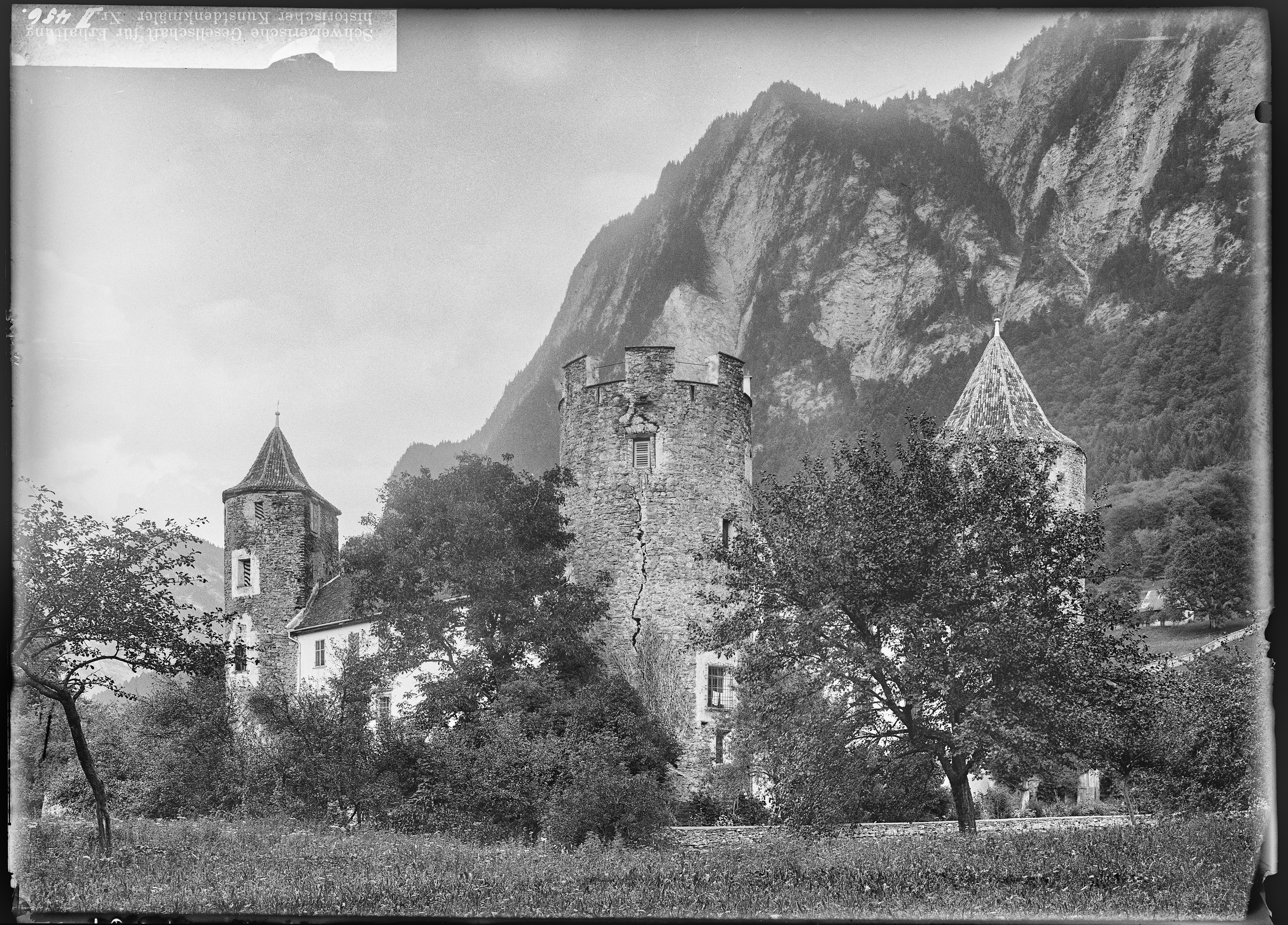
Photograph of the castle around 1900

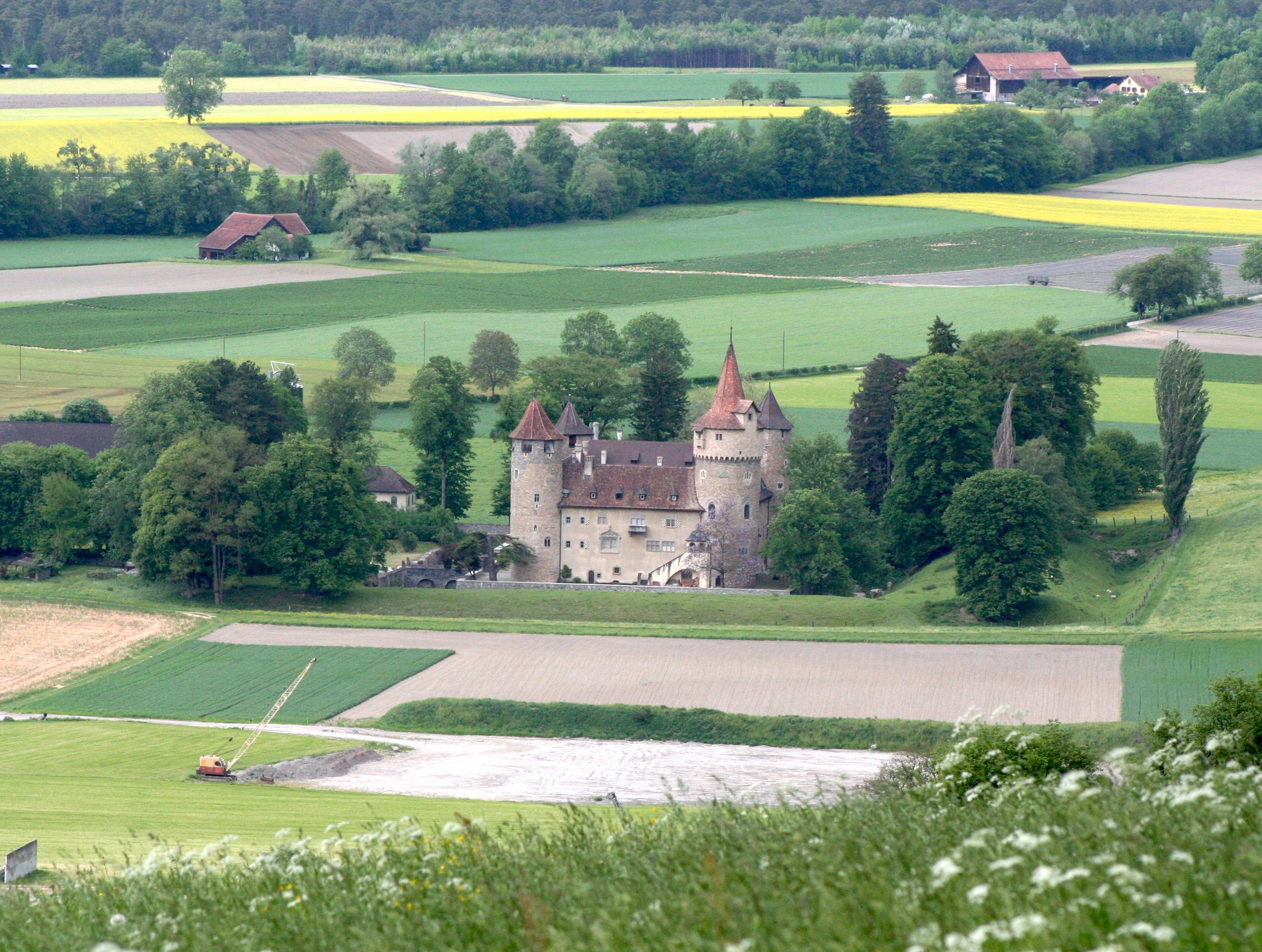
Castle seen from the south

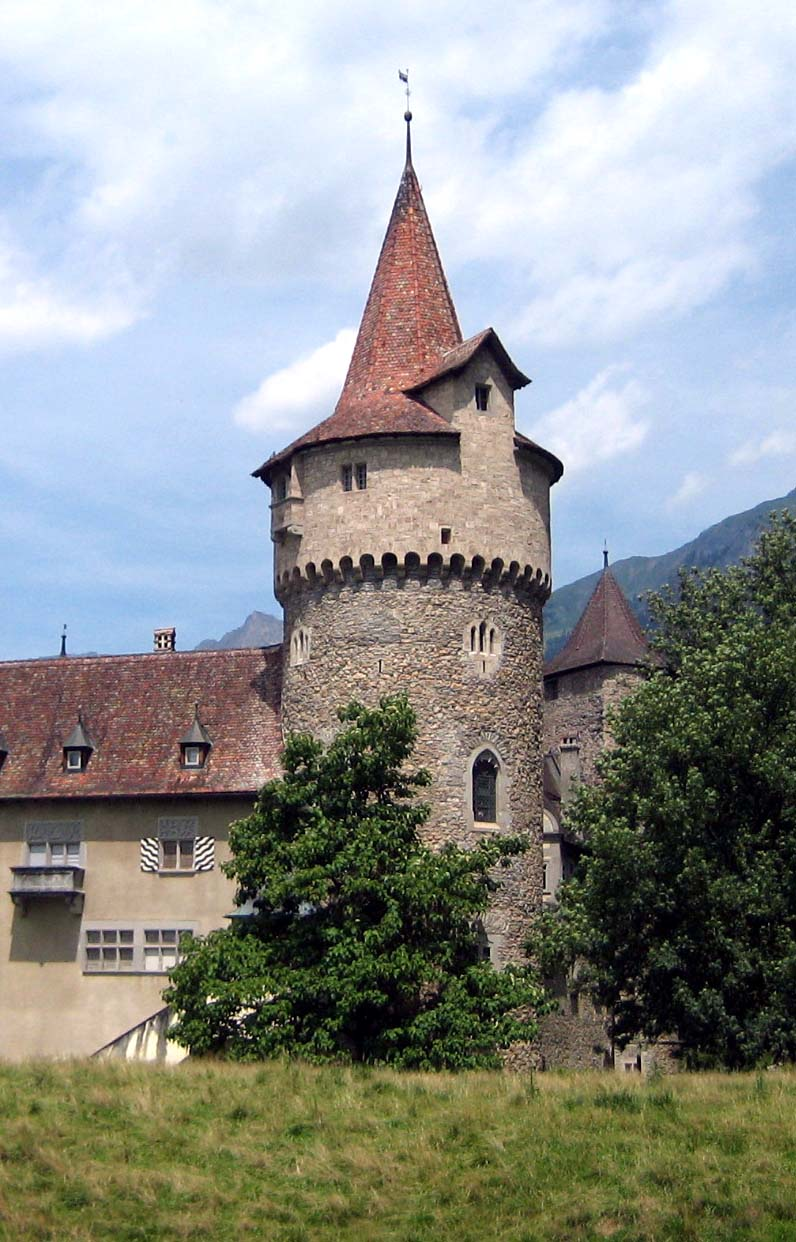
Main tower

== Notable people ==
- Ulysses von Salis-Marschlins (1728–1800), politician and diplomat.
- Anton von Salis-Marschlins (1732–1812), military officer.
- Carl Ulisses von Salis-Marschlins (1762–1818) naturalist interested in botany, entomology, and conchology.

== See also ==
- List of castles in Switzerland
