= Ulysses Salis =

Grisons officer (1594–1674)

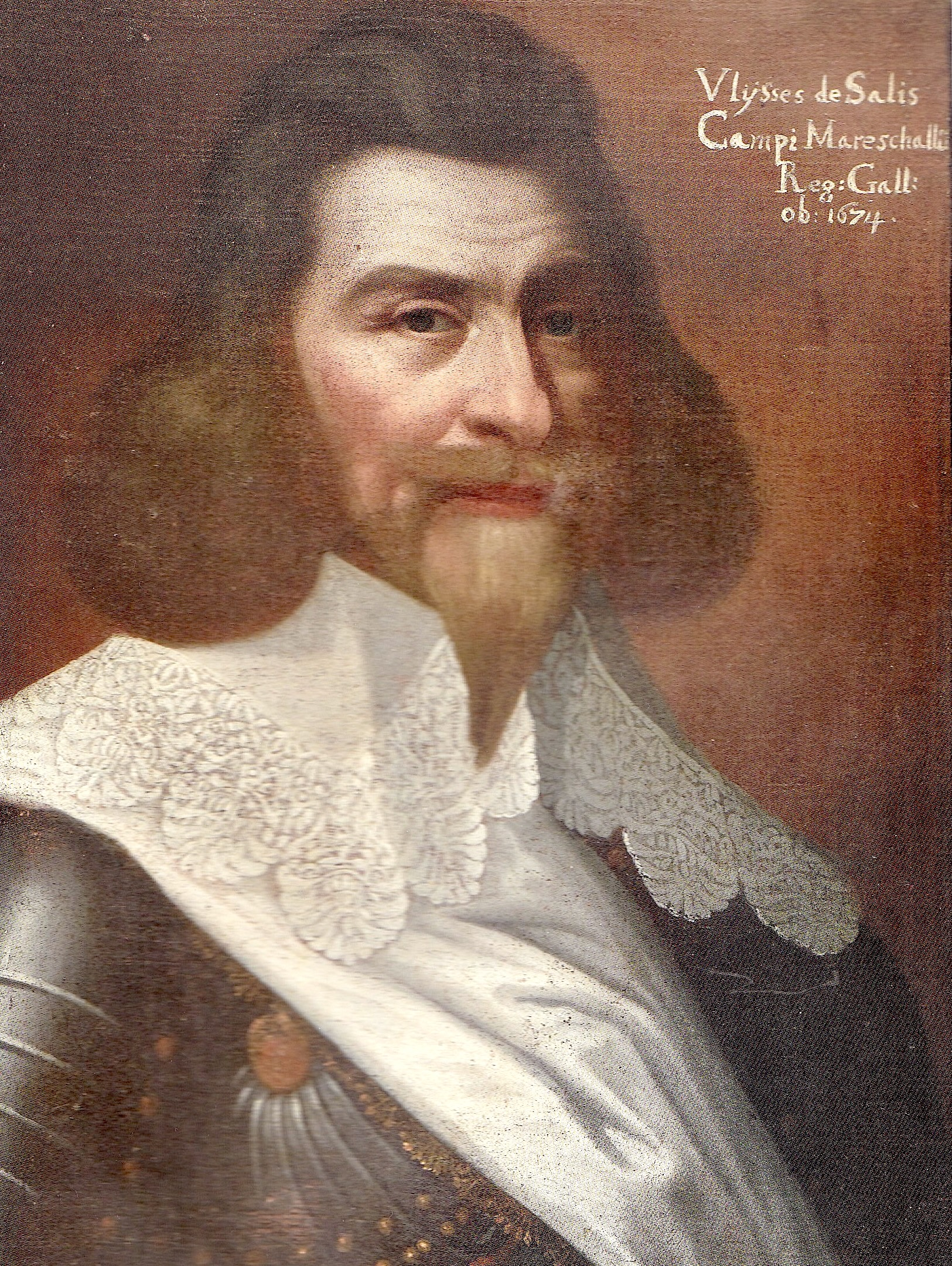
- Portrait
- Born: 23 July 1594; Grüsch, Three Leagues
- Died: 3 February 1674 (aged 79); Igis, Three Leagues
- Other name: Ulysses von Salis
- Occupations: Military officer; politician
- Spouse: Violanta von Salis (m. 1612)

Ulysses Salis (23 July 1594 – 3 February 1674), also Ulysses von Salis, was a military officer and politician from the Three Leagues and the progenitor of the Salis-Marschlins line. A leading partisan of Venice and France during the Bündner Wirren, he served in the armies of Venice, of Count Ernst von Mansfeld and of France, took part with his Grisons regiment in the Valtellina campaign of Henri de Rohan in 1635–1637, and was appointed maréchal de camp in 1641. In 1643, after 27 years of military service, he settled at Marschlins Castle, which he had converted from a ruin into a residence, and became one of the most influential figures in the Grisons.

== Biography ==
Ulysses Salis was born on 23 July 1594 in Grüsch. He was the son of Hercules and a brother of Carl and Rudolf. In 1612 he married Violanta von Salis, daughter of Johann Baptista, doctor of law. He was the progenitor of the Salis-Marschlins line.

In 1606 Salis accompanied two older brothers to their studies in Heidelberg. After stays in Paris and Orléans, he was a page in the service of the Duke of Bouillon until 1611. A leading partisan of Venice and France during the Bündner Wirren, he was a captain in Venetian service from 1616, sergeant major in the army of Count Ernst von Mansfeld in 1621–1622, and in 1624 lieutenant colonel in the French regiment of his brother Rudolf. The regiment was transferred to him after Rudolf's death in 1625, but was disbanded in 1627. As compensation he received a company of the French Swiss Guards. From 1631 he commanded a Grisons regiment as colonel, with which he took part in the successful Valtellina campaign of the French duke Henri de Rohan in 1635–1637. When part of the allied Grisons turned against Rohan in 1637, Salis refused in vain to evacuate the castle in Chiavenna. After Rohan's withdrawal he was one of the few Grisons officers who remained in French service. He fought in Flanders in 1638, was appointed maréchal de camp in 1641, and took part in further Italian campaigns.

Salis converted the ruined castle of Marschlins, which he had bought in 1633, into a residence (Schloss). He settled there in 1643 after 27 years of military service, and became one of the most influential figures in the Grisons. The same year he supported the jurisdictions (Gerichte) of the Prättigau in their struggle against the privileges of Davos in the League of the Ten Jurisdictions. As leader of the re-forming French party, he called for the buying out of the Austrian rights in the League. He was Landammann (chief magistrate) of the jurisdiction of the Four Villages (Vier Dörfer) and in 1646–1647 Bundslandammann (head) of the League of the Ten Jurisdictions. He died in Igis on 3 February 1674.

== Works ==
- Memorie del Maresciallo di campo Ulisse de Salis-Marschlins, 1931

== Bibliography ==
- C. Jecklin, "Die 'Memorie' des Marschalls Ulysses von Salis-Marschlins", in Bündnerisches Monatsblatt, 1931, 257–268
- A. Pfister, Jörg Jenatsch: Briefe 1614–1639, 1983
- A. Pfister, Jörg Jenatsch, 5th edition 1991
- A. Wendland, Der Nutzen der Pässe und die Gefährdung der Seelen, 1995
- Handbuch der Bündner Geschichte, 2, 2000, 133–134, 154–155
