= Meta von Salis =

Swiss feminist and historian

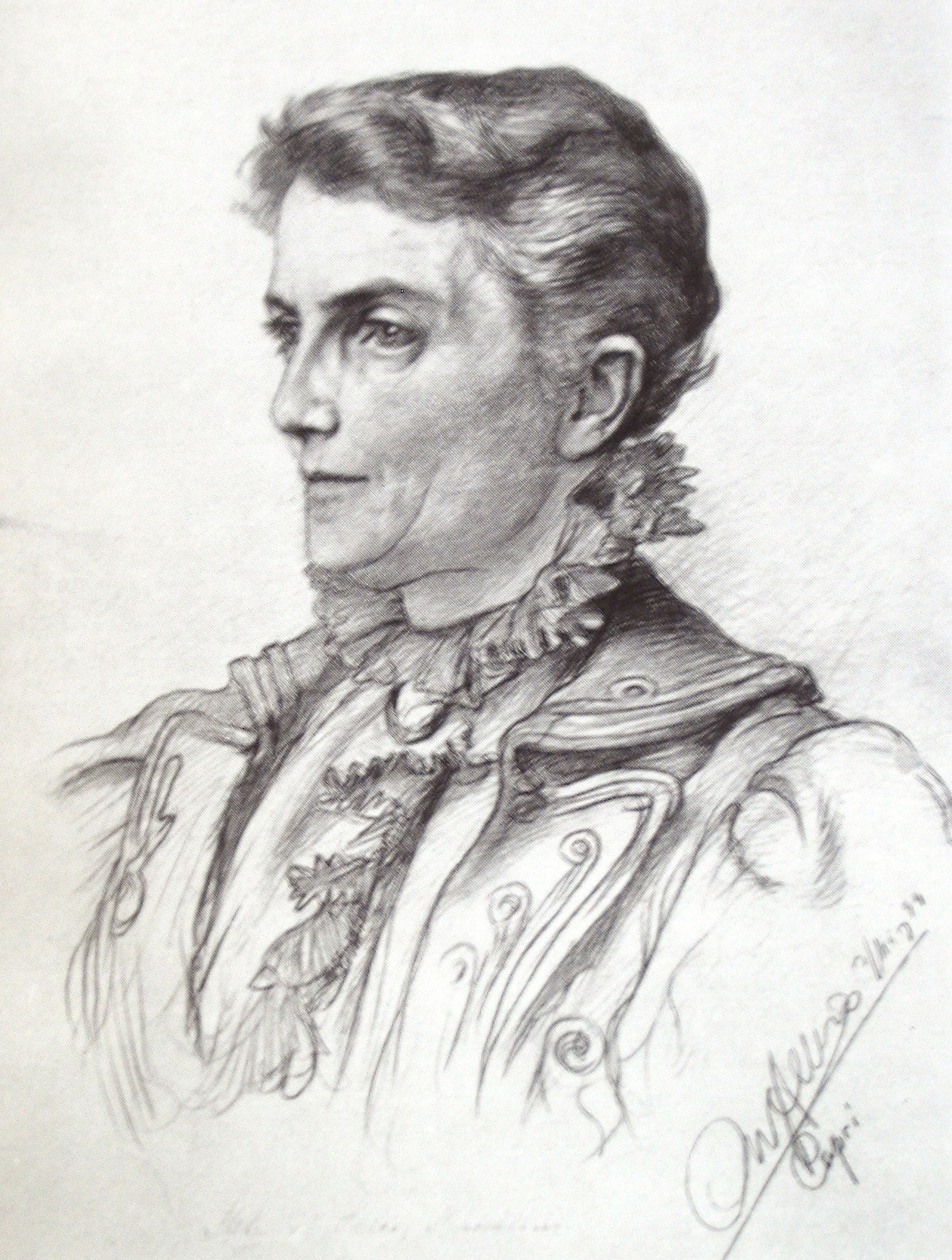
- Meta von Salis in the 1890s
- Born: Barbara Margaretha von Salis; 1 March 1855; Igis, Switzerland
- Died: 15 March 1929 (aged 74); Basel, Switzerland
- Education: University of Zurich
- Occupations: Journalist, suffragist

Barbara Margaretha "Meta" von Salis-Marschlins (1 March 1855 – 15 March 1929) was a Swiss suffragette and historian, as well as a regular correspondent of Friedrich Nietzsche.

== Early life and education ==
Meta von Salis was born in 1855 on her family's estate, Marschlins Castle, in Igis, Graubünden. Her parents were Ursula Margaretha and Carl Ulysses Adalbert von Salis-Marschlins (1795–1886), a Swiss naturalist. She attended a girls' school in Friedrichshafen, Germany from 1863 to 1868, and then attended another girls' school in Rorschach, Switzerland until 1871.

After leaving school, she worked as a governess for numerous wealthy families in Germany, England and Ireland before enrolling at the University of Zurich in 1883 to study history and philosophy. She received a PhD in 1887 for a thesis about Agnes of Poitou, making her the first Swiss woman to receive a doctorate degree. She said she was not interested in completing the degree for its own sake but rather "in the interests of the women's question".

== Career ==
After university, von Salis worked as a freelance journalist and speaker for the women's suffrage movement in Switzerland. In 1887 she wrote an article published in the Zurich Post that was one of the first to argue for universal suffrage for Swiss citizens. She met the philosopher and writer Friedrich Nietzsche in Zurich in 1884. Despite Nietzsche's disregard for feminists and the women's movement, their encounter "cast a 'golden shimmer' over the rest of her life", and they formed a long-lasting friendship.

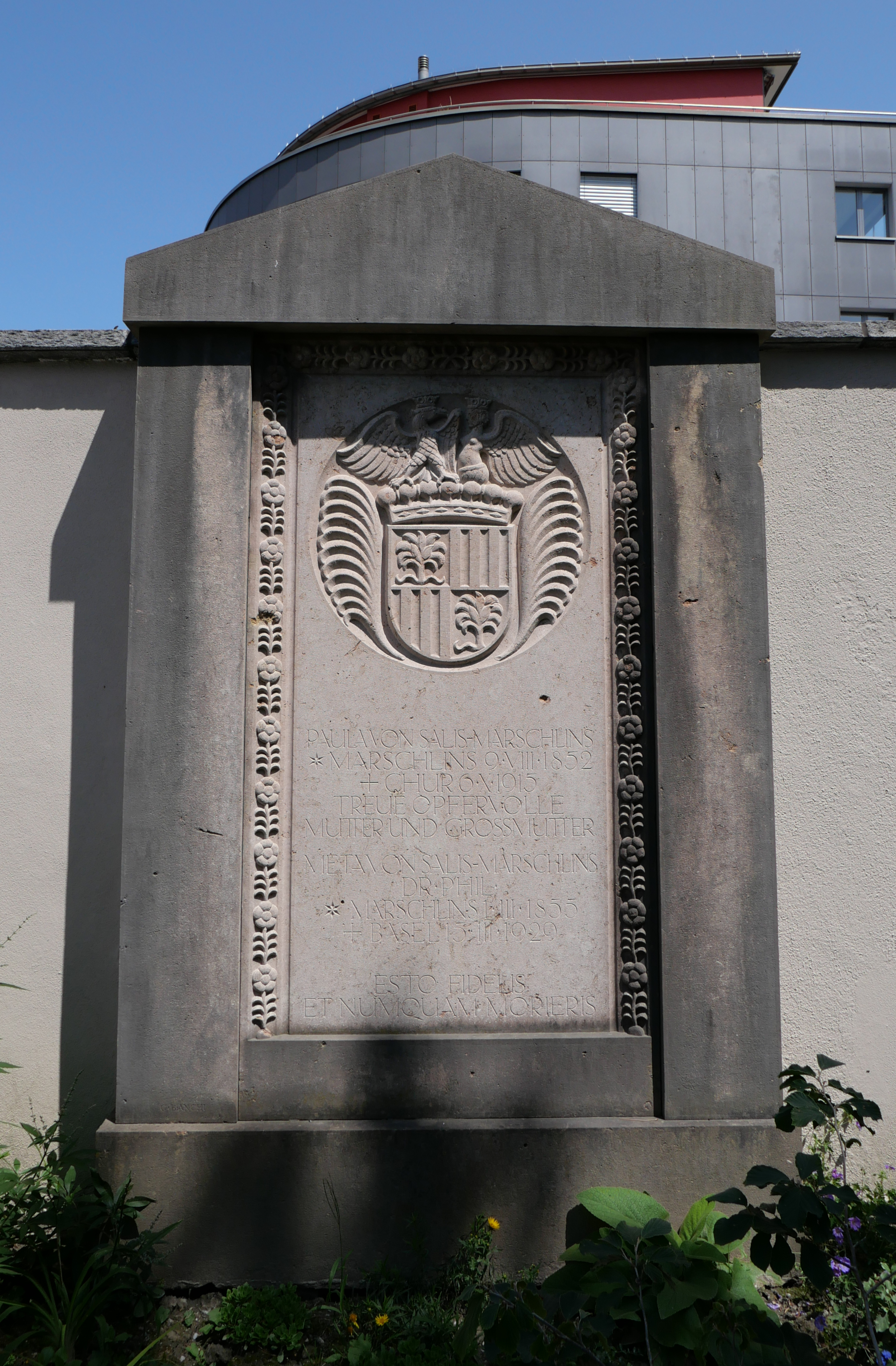
The grave of Meta von Salis and her sister Paula (1852–1915) at the Daleu cemetery in Chur

After their first encounter, von Salis spent several weeks in 1886 and 1887 at his summer house in Sils Maria. Although they were close friends, von Salis was horrified when someone suggested that she and Nietzsche should marry. In 1894, she helped Nietzsche's sister Elisabeth Förster-Nietzsche to found the Nietzsche-Archiv, but von Salis ceased her involvement in the cause after a quarrel with Förster-Nietzsche. Despite this, it was von Salis who purchased the Villa Silberblick in Weimar, where Nietzsche and his sister lived for the final years of his life before it became the permanent home of the Nietzsche-Archiv collection.

Von Salis was briefly imprisoned in 1904 for contempt of court after she tried to defend two wrongly charged women in an embezzlement case. Disillusioned with the Swiss democratic process, she then moved to the Italian island of Capri with her longtime friend Hedwig Kym. Following Hedwig Kym's marriage in 1910 to Swiss politician and attorney Ernst Feigenwinter, von Salis continued to live with the couple in their Basel home from 1910 until her death in 1929.

In her later life, she mostly retreated from the feminist movement and instead most of her writings focused on German nationalism and conservative race theory.
