= Salis family =

Noble family of the Grisons

Salis family von Salis
- Lower nobility
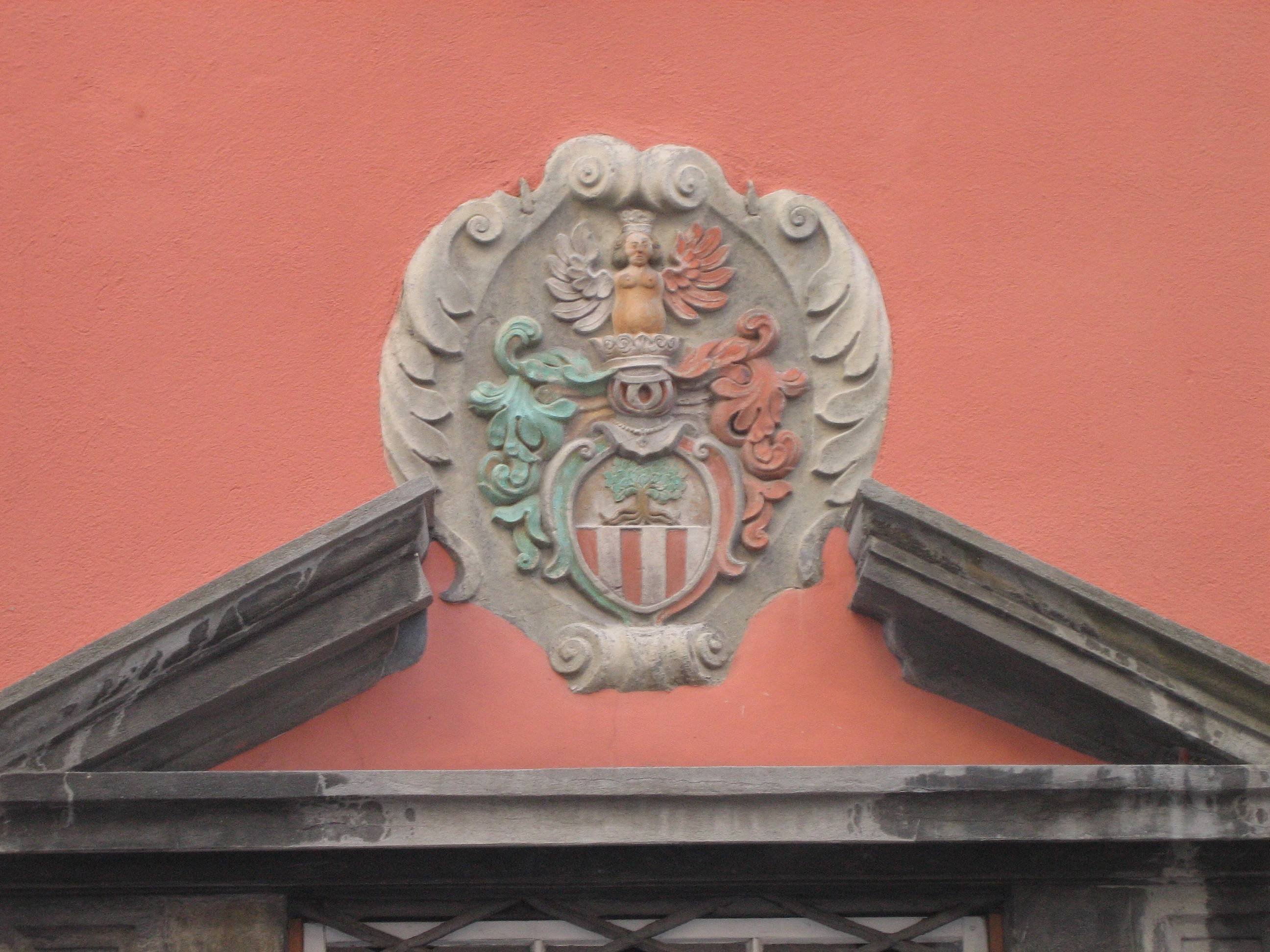
- Salis arms on a house in Chur
- Country: Switzerland
- Current region: Grisons
- Origin: Bregaglia
- Founded: 1300 (first record)
- Historic seat: Soglio
- Members: Anton von Salis-Marschlins; Simon von Salis-Zizers; Ulysses Salis-Marschlins; Johann Gaudenz von Salis-Seewis; Johann Ulrich von Salis-Soglio; Meta von Salis-Marschlins; Jean Rudolf von Salis-Soglio

The Salis family (also von Salis) is a family of the lower nobility of the Prince-Bishopric of Chur and an aristocratic family of the Three Leagues, from the Bregaglia, with its ancestral seat in Soglio. From the middle of the 16th century the Salis formed, alongside the von Planta, the most powerful family association in the Grisons, and by the end of the 18th century about 30 members of the family had reached the rank of general. After the Grisons was incorporated into the Helvetic Republic, the family's political position as a family association was largely broken.

== History ==
The family's ancestral seat was at Soglio, in the Bregaglia, where a Rudolf is first recorded in 1300. Probably descended from a family of the ruling class of Como, the Salis remained of only local importance in the 14th century. In 1396 they provided the first valley judge (Talrichter), and they were active as notaries in the south of the Grisons. With landed property in Chiavenna and Piuro in the Valtellina, they maintained family ties with the elite of the Duchy of Milan, from which they received trade privileges from 1391 to 1544. In the 15th century the Salis established themselves among the leading families of the prince-bishopric of Chur. They extended their possessions beyond the Bregaglia into the Upper Engadine and married into families of the bishop of Chur's service nobility (Dienstadel), without becoming particularly important as holders of episcopal lordships.

The family's heyday began in the 16th century, after the formation of the Free State of the Three Leagues. From the middle of the 16th century the Salis, alongside the von Planta, formed the most powerful family association (Familienverband) in the Grisons. In the late Middle Ages they served as mercenaries in northern Italy, and from the 16th century they did military service for the European great powers. The Salis were the most successful family of officers in the Grisons: by the end of the 18th century about 30 members had reached the rank of general, for example Anton von Salis-Marschlins, Simon von Salis-Zizers and Ulysses Salis-Marschlins. In the Valtellina, the Salis and the von Planta provided most of the officials (Amtsleute) in the 16th and early 17th centuries.

From the early 16th century the family spread across the whole of the Grisons in several lines, such as those of Samedan, Grüsch, Maienfeld, Zizers, Marschlins and Rietberg, which added to its leading position. The main line in Soglio continued, and branches formed in the Valtellina, in Germany, Austria and England. During the Bündner Wirren in the early 17th century the Salis were among the main actors, mostly on the side of the French-Venetian party and rarely on that of the Austrian-Spanish party. The rivalry with the von Planta culminated in 1621 in the murder of Pompejus von Planta-Wildenberg on behalf of the Venetian party led by the Salis-Grüsch.

After the Thirty Years' War the family's influence in the Grisons and the Valtellina grew. In the subject territories (Untertanenlande) they held more land than the rest of the Grisons elite and had the densest network of relations with the local ruling class. In the 18th century they provided most of the officials in the Valtellina and also strengthened their political position in the Grisons, where they had influence in each of the Three Leagues. Politically the Salis leaned more toward France until the Revolution, and toward Austria after it.

In the 18th century several leading families opposed the dominant position of the Salis in the Grisons and in the subject territories. In 1794 the Grisons Patriots, an opposition movement, succeeded in restricting this power. In the 18th and early 19th centuries the Salis had great influence in banking and in the forwarding trade (Speditionswesen) in the Grisons, and as lessees of the state tolls (Landeszölle). After the Grisons was incorporated into the Helvetic Republic, their political position as a family association was largely broken. In the 19th century several members of the family were active as politicians and soldiers at cantonal and federal level, for example Johann Gaudenz von Salis-Seewis and his son-in-law Johann Ulrich von Salis-Soglio. Meta von Salis-Marschlins made a name for herself as a women's rights activist, and Jean Rudolf von Salis-Soglio as a historian.

== See also ==
- De Salis, people with the surname
- Count de Salis-Soglio
- Count de Salis-Seewis

== Bibliography ==
- Nicolaus von Salis-Soglio, Die Familie von Salis. Gedenkblätter aus der Geschichte des ehemaligen Freistaates der drei Bünde in Hohenrhätien (Graubünden), 1891
- Nicolaus von Salis-Soglio, Regesten der im Archiv des Geschlechts-Verbandes derer von Salis befindlichen Pergamenturkunden, 1898 (Mitteilungen des Geschlechts-Verbandes derer von Salis, 1)
- Schweizerisches Geschlechterbuch, vol. 1, 1905, pp. 469–502; vol. 2, 1907, pp. 684–687; vol. 3, 1910, pp. 377, 667–697; vol. 5, 1933, pp. 530–534; vol. 7, 1943, pp. 453–483
- Anton von Sprecher, Stammbaum der Familie von Salis, 1941
- Paul Eugen Grimm, Die Anfänge der Bündner Aristokratie im 15. und 16. Jahrhundert, 1981
- Silvio Färber, Der bündnerische Herrenstand im 17. Jahrhundert. Politische, soziale und wirtschaftliche Aspekte seiner Vorherrschaft, 1983
- Adolf Collenberg, "Die Bündner Amtsleute in der Herrschaft Maienfeld 1509–1799 und in den Untertanenlanden Veltlin, Bormio und Chiavenna 1512–1797", in Jahrbuch der Historischen Gesellschaft von Graubünden, 129, 1999, pp. 1–118
- Peter Conradin von Planta, "Der Bernina-Bergwerksprozess von 1459–1462 und die Bergbauunternehmungen des Johann von Salis 1576–1618", in Jahrbuch der Historischen Gesellschaft von Graubünden, 130, 2000, pp. 1–144
- Verein für Bündner Kulturforschung (ed.), Handbuch der Bündner Geschichte, vols. 1 and 2, 2000
- Diego Giovanoli and Letizia Scherini, Häuser und Gärten der von Salis in Soglio und Chiavenna, 2006

=== Archives ===
- Bischöfliches Archiv Chur (Episcopal Archives of Chur), Chur
- Staatsarchiv Graubünden (State Archives of the Grisons), Chur, family archives
