= Hercules Salis (died 1620) =

Swiss politician (1566–1620)

Podestà of Tirano
- In office 1591–1593

Personal details
- Born: March 1566
- Died: 17 September 1620 (aged 54) Venice
- Spouse: Margaretha von Ott (m. 1586)
- Parents: Abundius Salis; Hortensia Martinengo di Barco

Hercules Salis (March 1566 – 17 September 1620, Venice) was a Swiss politician and military officer of the Salis family, from Soglio (today part of the municipality of Bregaglia) and Grüsch. The founder of the Salis-Grüsch line, he was one of the leaders of the Venetian party during the Bündner Wirren.

== Life ==
The son of Abundius and Countess Hortensia Martinengo di Barco, Salis married Margaretha von Ott in 1586.

He studied at Heidelberg and Tübingen, and served as podestà of Tirano from 1591 to 1593, as well as several times as landamman of the jurisdiction of Schiers. He was sent as delegate to the Valais (1600), Venice (1603), and Paris (1606), and served as colonel in the Venetian service.

Salis supported the Reformation in the Ticino bailiwicks. As leader of the Venetian party and an opponent of Catholicism, he was one of the main figures during the Bündner Wirren. In 1588 he settled in Grüsch, where he had a house (the Hohe Haus) built in 1590, and founded the Salis-Grüsch line. He was made a Knight of Saint Mark in 1603 and a baron.

== Bibliography ==
- N. von Salis-Soglio, Die Familie von Salis, 1891, pp. 146–149.
- A. Pfister, Jörg Jenatsch, 1938 (4th ed. 1984).
- M. Bundi, Frühe Beziehungen zwischen Graubünden und Venedig, 1988.
