= Buol family =

Grisons aristocratic family

- Aristocratic family
- Country: Old Swiss Confederacy, Margraviate of Baden, Habsburg Monarchy
- Origin: Walser
- Founded: First documented 1340 in Davos

The Buol family was an aristocratic Grisons family, influential mainly from the 15th to the 19th century. Probably of Walser origin, it first appears in 1340 with Ulrich von Bulen at Davos, from where it spread widely across the Grisons, into the Margraviate of Baden, and into Austria. Its genealogy before 1470 is poorly documented. The family produced landammänner of each of the Three Leagues, and its members frequently held the highest offices in the subject lands (Valtellina) and in Grisons diplomatic missions.

== Military and political activity ==
In the 16th and early 17th centuries, members of the family served as officers in the mercenary service of France, then from 1637 (with the formation of the anti-French Kettenbund) principally in the service of Spain, but also of the Emperor. In the 18th century, after the War of the Spanish Succession, they served France, Austria, and the Netherlands. The Buols allied themselves with the Grisons aristocracy: in the 16th century with the Beeli von Belfort, the Hartmannis, and the Guler von Wyneck; in the 17th century with the Planta-Rietberg, the Schauenstein and Ehrenfels, the Sprecher von Bernegg, the von Ott, the Schorsch, and the Jenatsch families; and in the 18th century with the Salis and the Grisons branch of the Pestalozzi.

== Protestant branch ==
The Protestant branch descended from Paul Buol settled at Churwalden, Chur, Bergün, Sankt Antönien, and in the Schanfigg and Domleschg valleys. Salomon Buol (1549–1624), son of Paul, magistrate at Davos and lieutenant-colonel, obtained from King Henry IV of France confirmation of the family's nobility. His son Meinrad Buol was the comrade-in-arms of Jörg Jenatsch. Around the middle of the 16th century, the Churwalden branches rose politically and socially through the purchase of estates, advantageous marriages, and service in foreign armies. In 1603 the family acquired the small castle of Parpan. Johann Anton Buol bought the Strassberg estates and obtained imperial nobility in 1649, with the title "von Strassberg".

== Catholic branch ==
His son Paul Buol von Strassberg und Rietberg changed confession and founded a Catholic line that prospered in the service of the Habsburgs of Austria as administrators, ambassadors, and ministers. Through Johann Anton Buol von Schauenstein, the line inherited from the Schauenstein family the lordship of Reichenau and the associated nobility. To this branch belonged Johann Anton Baptista Buol von Schauenstein, Rudolf Anton Buol, and Karl Rudolf Buol von Schauenstein, who from 1794 to 1833 was the last prince-bishop of Chur.

== Branch at Chur and Baden ==
Numerous Buols living in Chur from the 16th century onward sat on the council, held high offices in the Three Leagues, or served as officers in foreign service, especially in France. Stephan Buol inherited the Buol House in Chur, built around 1675 by Paul Buol von Strassberg und Rietberg, which has housed the Rätisches Museum since 1872. The Baden branch at Kaiserstuhl, descended around 1500 from the Buols of Davos, gave rise notably to the barons Buol-Wischenau and Buol-Berenberg, who in the 18th and 19th centuries produced numerous Austrian privy councillors, administrators, and officers. Baron Rudolf von Buol-Berenberg (1842–1902) was chamberlain of the Grand Duchy of Baden and a member of the German Reichstag (from 1884, Centre Party).

== Bibliography ==
- Staatsarchiv Graubünden, Chur (archival holdings).
- Almanach généalogique suisse, vol. 3, 1910, pp. 77–92; vol. 7, 1943, pp. 63–72.
- Sprecher, Anton von: Stammbaum der Familie Buol, 1934 (2nd ed. 1940).
- Färber, Silvio: Der bündnerische Herrenstand im 17. Jahrhundert. Politische, soziale und wirtschaftliche Aspekte seiner Vorherrschaft, 1983.
- Walser, Peter: "Drei Generationen der Davoser Familie Buol", in: Bündner Jahrbuch, 31, 1989, pp. 145–150.
