= Jenatsch family =

Swiss Protestant family from Engadin

Jenatsch
- Current region: Grisons, Switzerland
- Origin: Upper Engadin
- Founded: 1470 (first attested)

The Jenatsch family was an old Protestant family of the Upper Engadin, originally established at Samedan. It appears in 1470 with Andreas Jenatsch, a publicus notarius.

A descendant of the same name, admitted to the synod in 1555, served as pastor of Pontresina from 1559 to 1576. His son Israel (d. 1623) held the ministry in various parishes of the Grisons from 1586 to 1623, and was the father of the famous Jörg Jenatsch, pastor and later officer. From the mid-16th century onward, other members of the family pursued higher education, mainly at Zurich and Basel. While the aristocratic ruling class of the Grisons still regarded Jörg as a parvenu, opposing him and ultimately eliminating him, it did not impede the social and political advancement of his prosperous descendants.

== Descendants ==
Paul Jenatsch, son of Jörg, held offices in the League of the Ten Jurisdictions and in the Republic of the Three Leagues. His brother Georg (1637–1672), a lieutenant colonel, was appointed commissioner of Chiavenna in 1672 but died before taking office; he was the father of Georg (1662–1741), lieutenant colonel in the service of Venice, who resided at Piuro from 1729 to 1731, probably as podestà. Paul's four sons all held high offices in the subject lands: Paul (1651–1685) was elected governor general of the Valtellina for 1685–1687, but died before taking office, and his brother Georg (also Jörg, 1658–1724) took his place. Andreas (1661–1709), landamman of the League of the Ten Jurisdictions (1699–1700), was podestà of Piuro (1687–1689) and of Traona (1695–1697). He died before he could take up the office of vicar (supreme judge of the Valtellina), which instead went to his younger brother Johann Anton Jenatsch from 1709 to 1711. The family's social rise is reflected in its marriage ties with the Sprecher, Buol, Planta, Schmid von Grüneck, and Schorsch families.

== Later history ==
In the 18th and 19th centuries, the family produced a number of officers in the service of Holland, Genoa, and Venice. Johann Ulrich (1825–1911), lieutenant colonel in the service of Austria, was the last direct descendant of Jörg.

== Bibliography ==
- A. Sprecher, Stammbaum der Familie Jenatsch, manuscript, 1941 (Kantonsbibliothek Graubünden).
- Collenberg, Adolf: Die Bündner Amtsleute in der Herrschaft Maienfeld 1509-1799 und in den Untertanenlanden Veltlin, Bormio und Chiavenna 1512-1797, in: Jahrbuch der Historischen Gesellschaft von Graubünden, 129, 1999, pp. 1–118.
