= Johann Anton Jenatsch =

Swiss politician (1672–1728)

Landamman of the League of the Ten Jurisdictions
- In office 1723

Personal details
- Born: 14 March 1672 Tirano
- Died: 24 July 1728 (aged 56) Davos
- Spouses: Verena von Janett; Ursula Prudentia Buol von Strassberg
- Parent: Paul Jenatsch

Johann Anton Jenatsch (14 March 1672 – 24 July 1728) was a Swiss politician, military officer, and landowner from Davos. The son of Paul Jenatsch and grandson of Jörg Jenatsch, he served as landamman of the League of the Ten Jurisdictions in 1723.

== Life ==
Jenatsch married first Verena von Janett of Fideris, daughter of Peter, landamman of the League of the Ten Jurisdictions, and then Ursula Prudentia Buol von Strassberg, daughter of Johann Anton Buol von Strassberg. He was a major landowner in Davos and served as captain in the Spanish service. He held the offices of landamman of Davos, bailiff of Maienfeld (1701–1703), commissioner of Chiavenna (1719–1721), and landamman of the League of the Ten Jurisdictions (1723).

== Bibliography ==
- P. Walser, "Inschriften und Stiftungen der Familie Jenatsch auf Davos", in Bündner Jahrbuch, 18, 1976, pp. 87–88.
