= Johann Anton Baptista Buol von Schauenstein =

Swiss diplomat (1729–1797)

- Born: 1729
- Died: 1797 (aged 67–68)
- Occupations: Diplomat, canon
- Known for: Austrian minister to the Three Leagues
- Title: Baron of Schauenstein
- Spouse(s): Johanna, Countess of Sarntheim
- Parent: Rudolf Anton Buol von Schauenstein (father)

Johann Anton Baptista Buol von Schauenstein (1729–1797) was a Swiss diplomat and canon from Sumvitg, who served as the Austrian minister to the Three Leagues from 1765 to 1792.

== Biography ==
Buol von Schauenstein was born in 1729, the son of Rudolf Anton Buol von Schauenstein. He married Johanna, Countess of Sarntheim. Originally a canon of Chur, he renounced the ecclesiastical state and became Austrian minister to the Three Leagues from 1765 to 1792.

After the death of the sons of his uncle Johann Anton Buol von Schauenstein, he inherited the title of Baron of Schauenstein, as well as the lordships of Reichenau and Tamins. Burdened with debt, he sold his properties in 1792 to the Bavier trading house and to Georg Anton Vieli.

== Bibliography ==
- A. Maissen, Die Landrichter des Grauen Bundes 1424–1797, 1990, 95.
