= Paul Buol von Strassberg und Rietberg =

Swiss baron and officer (1634–1697)

- Born: 1634
- Died: 18 February 1697 (aged 62–63); Chur
- Occupations: Magistrate, military officer, diplomat
- Known for: Landamman of the League of the Ten Jurisdictions; Baron of the Holy Roman Empire
- Spouse: Narcissa von Planta-Wildenberg
- Father: Johann Anton Buol von Strassberg

Paul Buol von Strassberg und Rietberg (1634 – 18 February 1697, in Chur) was a Grisons political and military figure, Landamman of the League of the Ten Jurisdictions, colonel in Spanish service, and diplomat. Originally Protestant and later Catholic, he was a citizen of Parpan and a leading figure of the Spanish-Austrian party in the Three Leagues.

== Biography ==
He was the son of Johann Anton Buol von Strassberg and married Narcissa von Planta-Wildenberg. He served as Landamman of the League of the Ten Jurisdictions in 1673, captain of the Valtellina from 1681 to 1683, and Landamman of the jurisdiction of Churwalden in 1683. He was also a colonel in Spanish service and a delegate of the Three Leagues to the courts of Spain and Austria.

After his conversion to Catholicism in 1691, Buol renounced his right of citizenship in the League of the Ten Jurisdictions. In 1692 he bought half of Rietberg Castle, whose name he took when Leopold I made him a baron of the Holy Roman Empire in 1696. He was a prominent figure of the Spanish-Austrian party. The house he had built in Chur around 1675 has housed the Rätisches Museum since 1872.

== Bibliography ==
- A. Maissen, Die Landrichter des Grauen Bundes 1424–1797, 1990, p. 94.
