= Hercules Salis =

Hercules Salis may refer to:

- Hercules Salis (died 1575) (1500–1575), Grisons politician, governor of the Valtellina
- Hercules Salis (died 1620) (1566–1620), Swiss politician and military officer from Soglio
- Hercules Salis (died 1727) (1650–1727), Swiss politician from the Grisons
