= Pompeius Planta =

Pompeius von Planta
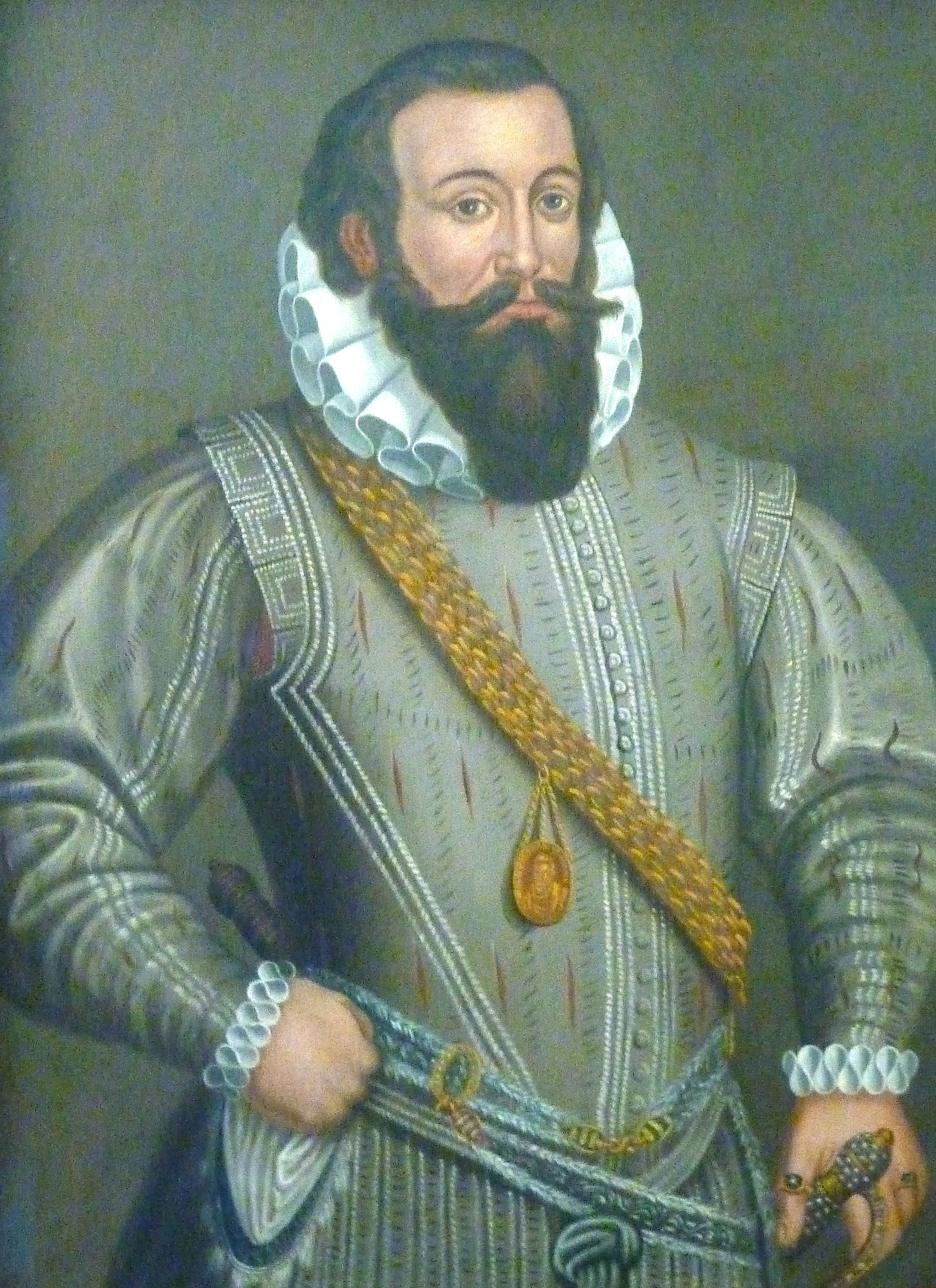
- Pompeius Planta (1570–1621)
- Born: 1570
- Died: 25 February 1621; Rietberg Castle, Three Leagues
- Occupation: Political leader
- Years active: 1614–1621
- Spouse: Catharina von Salis

Pompeius Planta (or Pompejus (von) Planta, 1570–25 February 1621, Rietberg Castle) was a leader of the Spanish-Austrian Party during the so-called Bündner Wirren. His murder by Jörg Jenatsch marked a key Protestant (and anti-Habsburg) uprising in Graubünden during the Thirty Years War.

== Life ==
Pompeius studied in Basel and converted to Catholicism after graduation. As a member of the important Planta family, he soon found himself in high office: in 1614 he was bailiff of the Bishopric of Chur in Fürstenau, as well as Hereditary Marshal. He married Catharina von Salis, the daughter of the Governor-General of the Valtellina. Together with his older brother Rudolf, he led the movement for the Three Leagues to support the Austro-Spanish party. In 1618, his opponents of the Franco-Venetian Party outlawed the Planta brothers and sentenced them to death.

On 25 February 1621, Pompeius was murdered in the presence of his daughter Catherina at Rietberg Castle in Domleschg by a group led by his opponent Jörg Jenatsch. Planta had allegedly hidden with his dog above the fireplace in the tower, where the whining of the dog gave his position away. According to tradition, his heart was removed from his body.

Pompeius Planta is probably the most famous of all the Planta clan, because he and his daughter Catharina (renamed Lucrecia) were immortalised in Conrad Ferdinand Meyer's popular 1876 novel Jürg Jenatsch.

== Sources and further reading ==
- Planta, Pompejus von (2011) in Historical Dictionary of Switzerland
- Wilhelm Oechsli, History of Switzerland 1499-1914, 1922, [2013] pp. 189, 195
- James Murray Luck, A History of Switzerland: The First 100,000 Years, 1985, p. 188
