= Campell Castle =

Castle in Switzerland

- Campì
- Sils im Domleschg
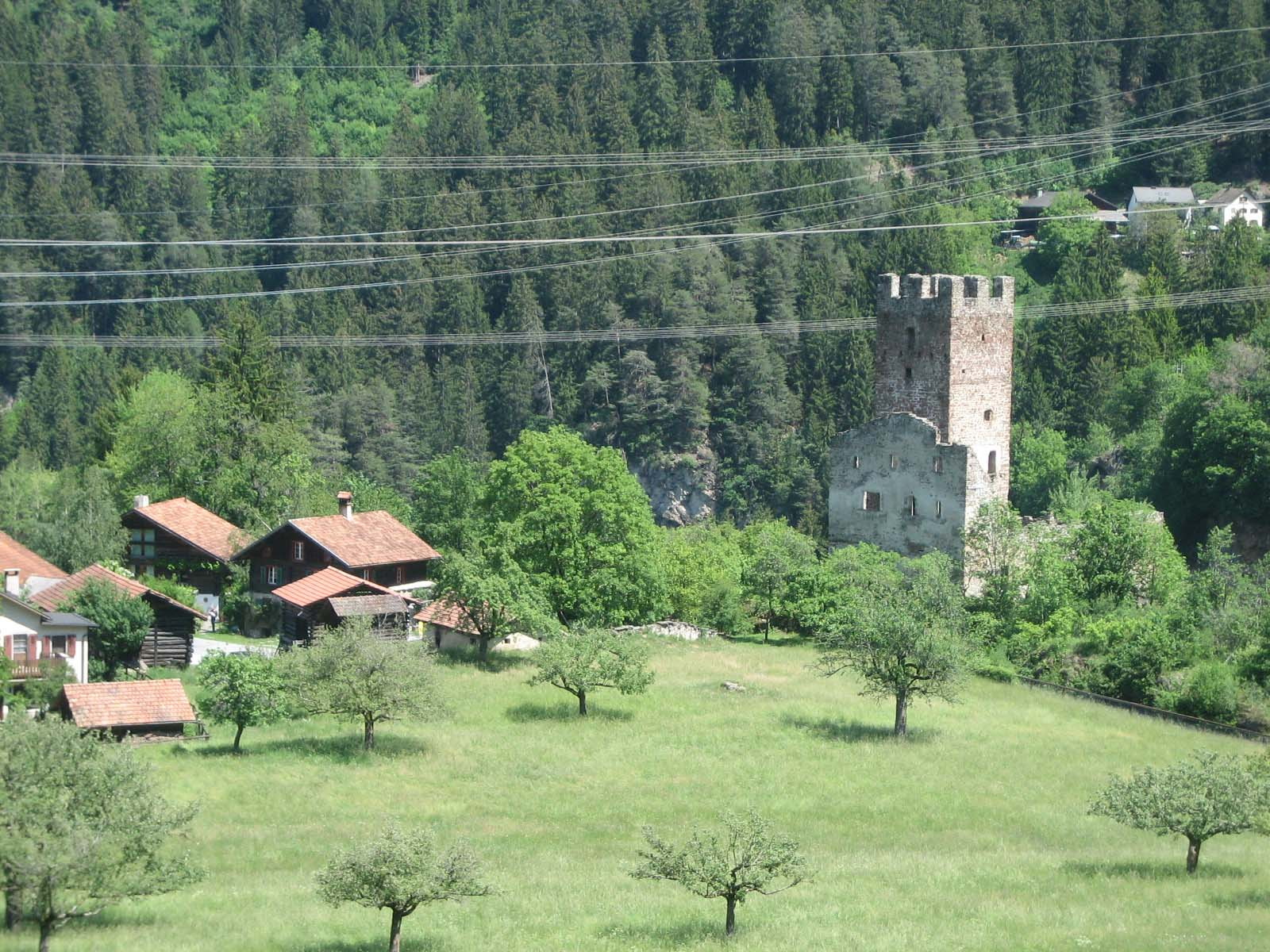
- Ruins of Campell

Site information
- Type: hill castle
- Code: CH-GR
- Condition: ruin

Location
- Location within Canton of Graubünden Location within Switzerland
- Coordinates: 46°42′1.6″N 9°28′17″E
- Height: 772 m above the sea

Site history
- Built: early 13th century

Campell or Campi Castle is a castle in the municipality of Sils im Domleschg of the Canton of Graubünden in Switzerland. It is a Swiss heritage site of national significance.

== History ==
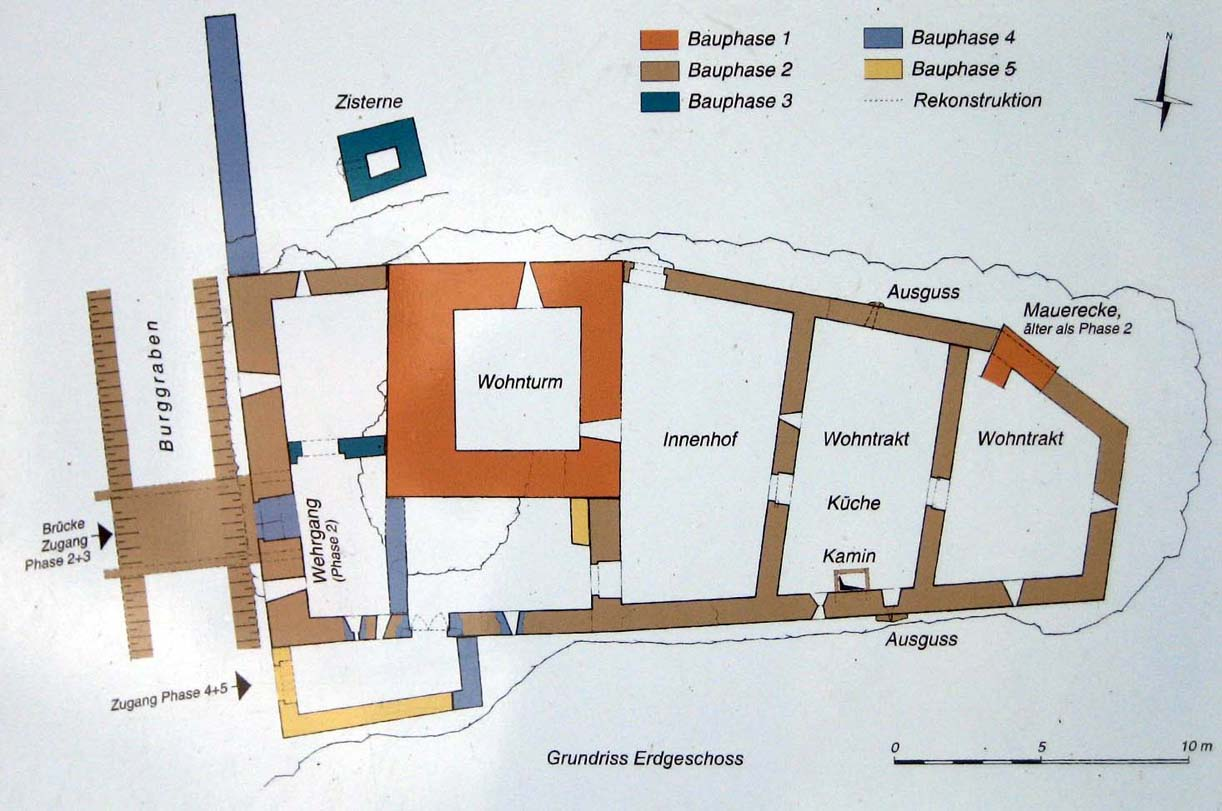
Construction phases of Campell Castle

The castle was probably begun in the early 13th century for the knightly von Campell family. The first mention of the family is from 1289 when Egeno de Campelle appears in a record. The original castle was a four-story bergfried.(Bauphase 1 on drawing) In the 13th or early 14th century it was expanded with a ring wall, gatehouse, ditches and a drawbridge on the west side and a residential wing on the east.(Bauphase 2) However, the Campell family died out in the 14th century. In 1389 the Bishopric of Chur recorded that Bishop Hartmann granted lands that used to be the Campell fief to Hans and Gottfried von Ehrenfels. Though the grant probably did not include the castle, because it wasn't until 1418 that the Bishop granted the castle to Hermann von Schauenstein-Ehrenfels.

During the 15th century, the west wall was raised and had a roof added. The original tower had two more stories added and was topped with crenelations. A large cistern was excavated to the north.(Bauphase 3) Around the middle of the 15th century the castle was given to the Ringg family, but in 1500 it was returned to the Schauenstein family, so it is unclear who renovated the castle.

In the 16th century it was once again rebuilt. The west wall and zwinger were roofed over and became a three-story palas. The old gate in the west was walled up and a new one was added in the south wall. The west wall was extended northward to protect the castle's flank.(Bauphase 4)

In 1562 the Schauenberg-Ehrenfels sold the castle to Hans Faschau. A few years later, in 1567, he sold it to Hercules von Salis, whose family held the castle for almost a century. During the Bündner Wirren of the Thirty Years' War the castle was damaged by fire. The west palas was rebuilt in 1635, while the east residential wing was abandoned and became a stable.(Bauphase 5) In 1647 the Salis family sold it to the Freiherr von Schauenstein-Fürstenau. By 1700 it was abandoned, but remained in good condition. By 1900, it had fallen into ruin when the Albula line of the Rhaetian Railway was built over the outer moat. In 1932 the Campell family bought the castle. It remained with this family until 1987 when they donated it to the Campell/Campi Ruin Foundation (Stiftung Ruine Campell/Campi). Between 1993 and 1998 the ruins were stabilized, repaired and excavated and they opened to visitors in 2001.

== Castle site ==
Aerial video of Campell Castle.

Much of the castle is still standing. The original tower stands in the center of the complex. At the foot of the tower is an arched doorway that leads to the eastern wing of the castle. Both the tower and the east wing have retained their medieval character. The west palas was built after the castle had ceased being a fortification and had become a nobleman's house and so has large windows which would have lit comfortable rooms.

== Gallery ==
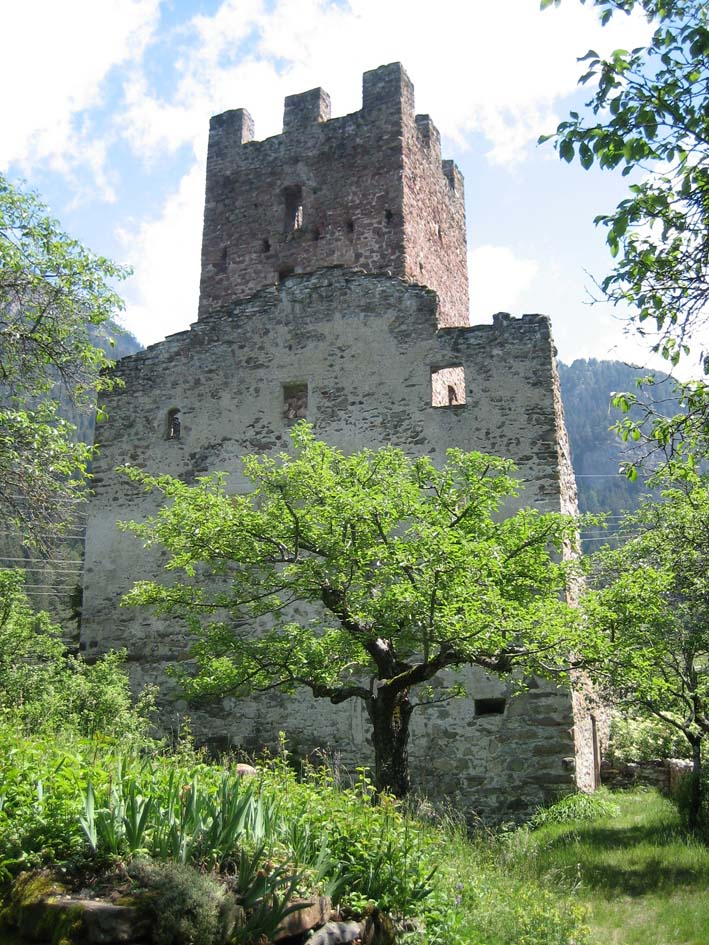
Campell or Campi Castle

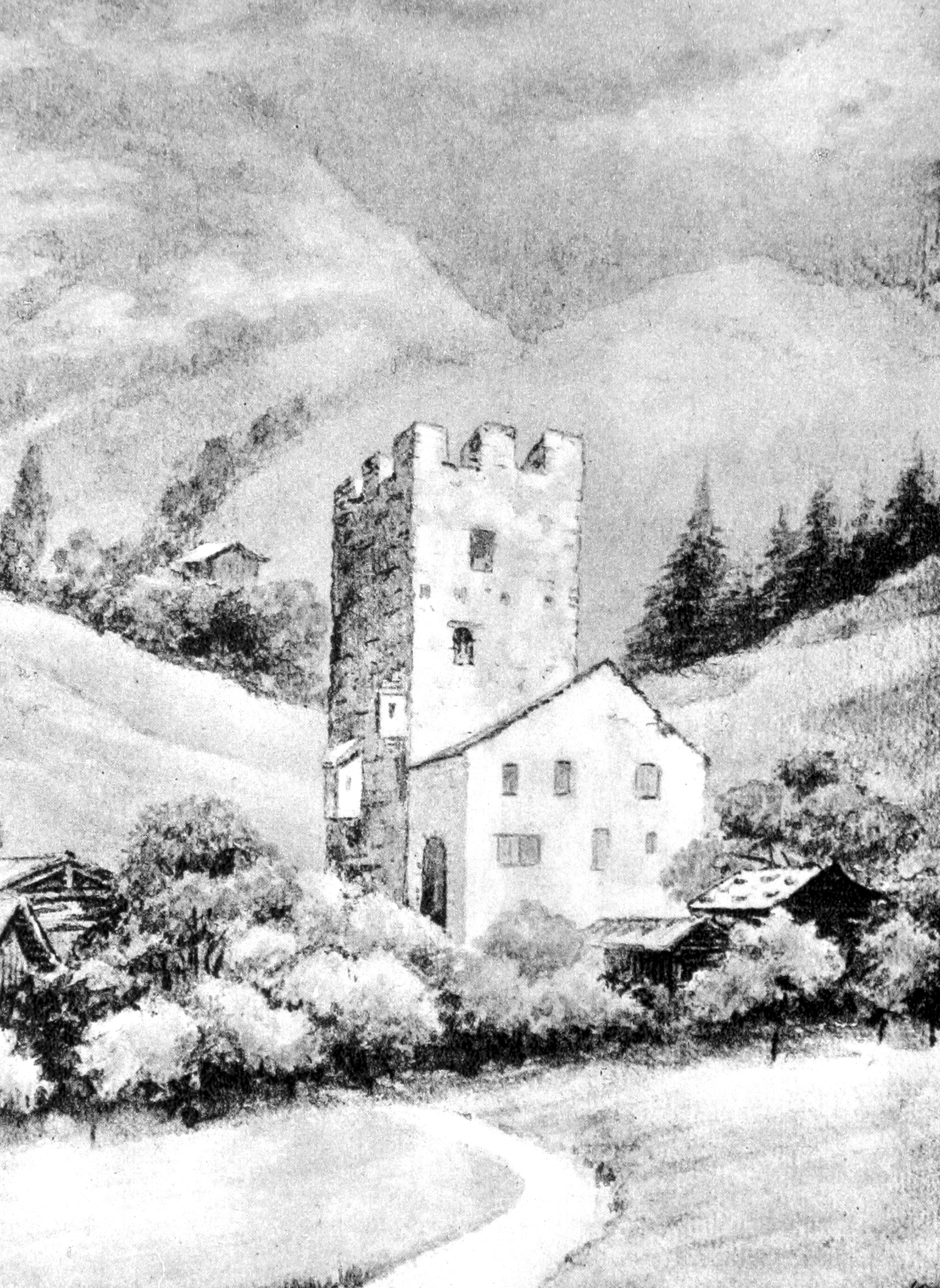
Campell Castle in 1894

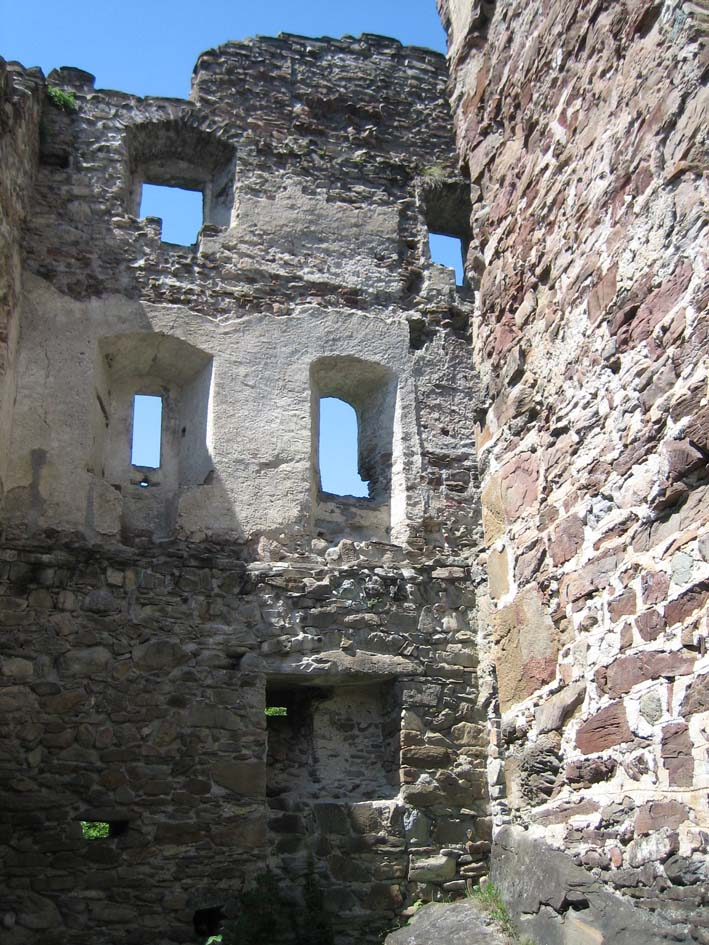
The palas with its large windows

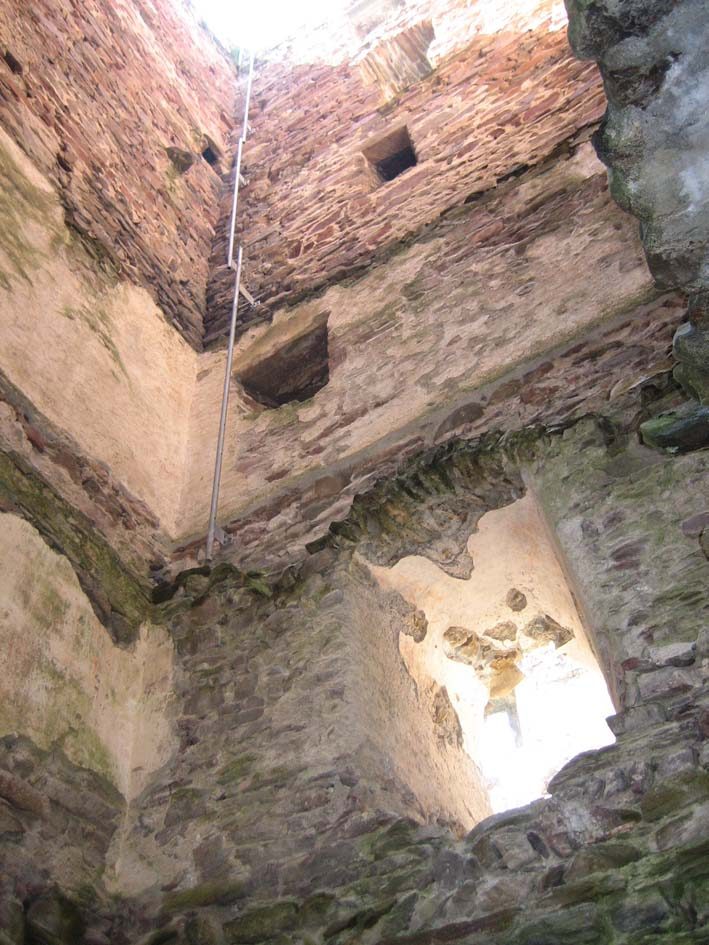
Interior of the main tower

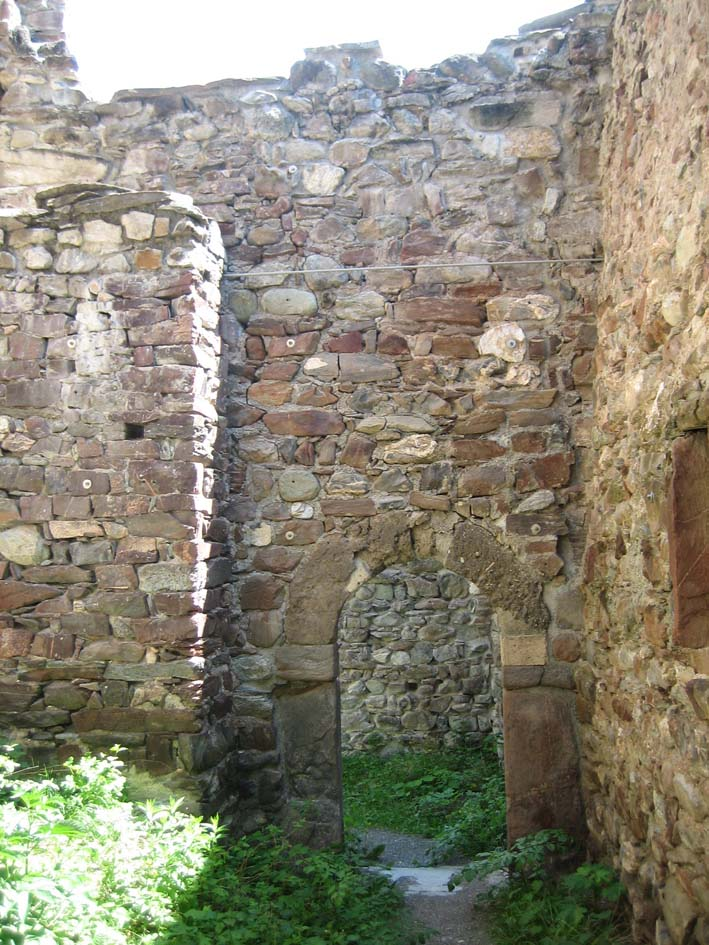
Doorway to the eastern wing

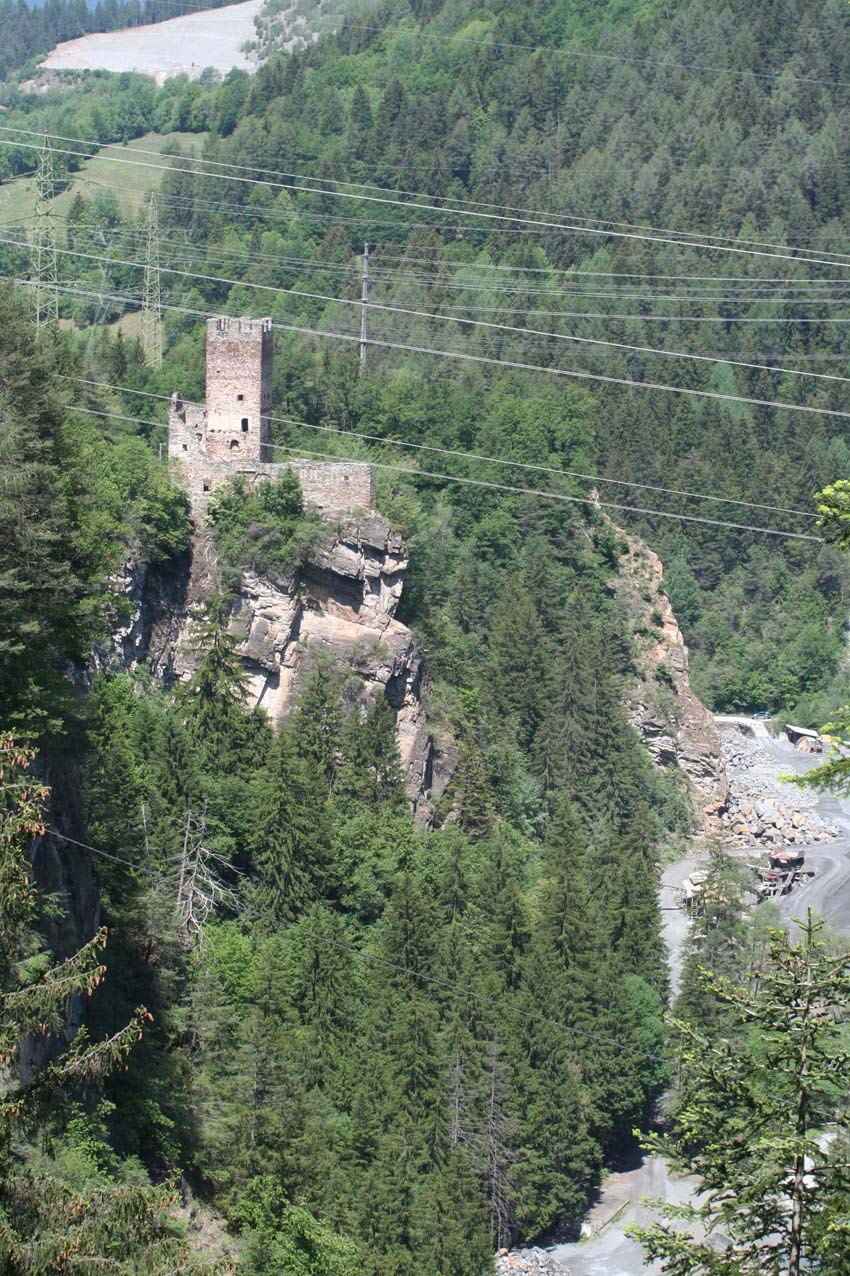
Campell Castle above the Albula river

== See also ==
- List of castles in Switzerland
