= Kaiserstuhl =

Kaiserstuhl may refer to:

- Kaiserstuhl (Aargau), a town in the Swiss canton of Aargau
- Kaiserstuhl (Baden-Württemberg), a mountain range in the German state of Baden-Württemberg
- Kaiserstuhl (Obwalden), a settlement in the municipality of Lungern in the Swiss canton of Obwalden
- Kaiserstuhl (South Australia), a mountain in the Australian state of South Australia
- Kaiserstuhl (asteroid), a main belt asteroid
- Kaiserstuhl (coal mine), a coal mine in the German city of Dortmund
- Kaiserstuhl (coking plant), a former coking plant in the German city of Dortmund
- Kaiserstuhl (throne), the throne of the German emperors and kings

== See also ==
- Kaiserstuhl Conservation Park
- Kaiserstuhl Railway
- Kaiserstuhl railway station (disambiguation)
