= Paul Buol =

Grisons magistrate and diplomat

- Born: 1478/1481
- Died: 18 May 1567; Davos
- Other name: Lux
- Occupations: Magistrate, diplomat, mercenary officer
- Spouses: Anna Mosleiner; Anna (surname unknown)
- Children: 25

Paul Buol, known as Lux (1478/1481 – 18 May 1567), was a magistrate, diplomat, and mercenary officer from Davos in the Grisons. He served as ambassador of the Three Leagues in France and as Landamman of the League of the Ten Jurisdictions.

== Life and career ==
Buol was the son of Hans Buol. He married first Anna Mosleiner and then a second Anna of unknown surname, and was the father of twenty-five children. He served France on several occasions, notably as supreme judge of the Grisons troops, and acted as ambassador of the Three Leagues in France. He was Landamman of the League of the Ten Jurisdictions in 1527–1528 and 1560–1561, and podestà of Morbegno in 1557. Highly esteemed, he was often called upon as an arbiter, and the rise of the Buol family is essentially tied to his person.

== Bibliography ==
=== Sources ===
- H. Ardüser, Wahrhafte und kurtzvergriffne Beschreibung etlicher herlicher und hochvernampter Personen in alter freier Rhätia, 1598, 18–19.

=== Secondary literature ===
- P. Walser, "Drei Generationen der Davoser Familie Buol", in Bündner Jahrbuch, 1989, 145–146.
