= Stephan Buol =

Swiss military officer and politician

- Born: 1658; Chur
- Died: May 3, 1736
- Occupations: Colonel, Burgomaster
- Spouse(s): Magdalena von Buol-Strassberg; Cordula Magdalena Sprecher von Bernegg
- Family: Buol

Stephan Buol (1658 – 3 May 1736) was a Grisons military officer and politician from Chur. He served as a colonel in the French Army and held the office of burgomaster of Chur repeatedly between 1699 and 1729.

== Life and career ==
Stephan Buol was born in 1658, the son of Paul Buol, Landvogt of Maienfeld. He married twice: first to Magdalena von Buol-Strassberg, and second to Cordula Magdalena Sprecher von Bernegg, daughter of Heinrich Sprecher von Bernegg, governor-general of Valtellina, and widow of Antonio de Lazzaroni. He was a Protestant and a citizen of Chur.

Buol served as a colonel in foreign military service under France. In Chur, he was a member of the guild of Shoemakers (Korporation der Schuster). From 1699 to 1729, he alternated between serving as active burgomaster and burgomaster-in-repose (Bürgermeister in Ruh), and presided over the League of God's House (Gotteshausbunds) on several occasions. From 1697, he owned the Buol hotel in Chur, which today houses the Rhaetian Museum (Rätisches Museum).

== Bibliography ==
- U. Jecklin, «Die Churer Bürgermeister/Stadtpräsidenten», in Bündner Monatsblatt, 1988, p. 231
