= Kaiserstuhl railway station =

Kaiserstuhl railway station may refer to:

- Kaiserstuhl AG railway station, on the Winterthur to Koblenz line in the Swiss canton of Aargau
- Kaiserstuhl OW railway station, on the Brünig line in the Swiss canton of Obwalden
