= Meinrad Buol =

Swiss politician (1588–1658)

Landamman of Davos
- In office 1629–1643

Landamman of the League of the Ten Jurisdictions
- In office 1629–1643; 1647–1648; 1655–1656

Personal details
- Born: 31 October 1588 Davos
- Died: 13 July 1658 (aged 69) Davos

Meinrad Buol (31 October 1588 – 13 July 1658) was a Swiss politician and military officer from Davos, who served several terms as landamman of Davos and of the League of the Ten Jurisdictions in the Three Leagues.

== Life ==
Buol was the son of Salomon Buol, landamman of the League of the Ten Jurisdictions. He married three times: first Elisabeth Bavier, then Barbara Sprecher von Bernegg, and finally Anna Kuon (Kuhn) of Rheineck. He began his career as deputy secretary in Davos and served as podestà of Bormio (1607–1609) and Teglio (1613–1615), and as consistorial judge in Davos in 1617.

== Political career ==
Buol was landamman of Davos from 1629 to 1643 and, in that capacity, also landamman of the League of the Ten Jurisdictions. His re-election in 1642 provoked a conflict with the other jurisdictions of the League and led to the Waser ruling. He served again as landamman of the League from 1647 to 1648 and from 1655 to 1656.

In 1643 he was appointed captain general of the Valtellina, and in 1651 he presided over the Syndicate, the commission overseeing the administration of the Valtellina. Between 1629 and 1642 he served on several occasions as ambassador of the Three Leagues. Initially one of the leaders of the Franco-Venetian faction, Buol later advocated an accommodation with the Habsburgs of Madrid and Vienna.

== Bibliography ==
- P. Walser, "Meinrad Buol", in Davoser Revue, 1988, 129–132.
