= Johann Anton Buol von Strassberg =

Swiss officer and politician (1601–1662)

- Born: 1601
- Died: 1662 (aged 60–61)

Johann Anton Buol von Strassberg (1601–1662) was a Swiss officer, magistrate and member of the League of the Ten Jurisdictions, from Churwalden.

== Biography ==
Buol was the son of Ulrich, a podestà. He married Prudenzia à Ries and, later, Barbara von Reidt. He studied in Zürich and Basel (1616), and in Geneva and Heidelberg (1619). He served several times as Landamman of the jurisdiction of Churwalden.

He was captain in the Brügger regiment in French service (1636), and joined the Kettenbund, the anti-French league, in 1637. He became colonel in Spanish service in 1638, and served as Landamman of the League of the Ten Jurisdictions in 1649, 1650 and 1657. He was podestà in the Valtellina, at Morbegno (1639), Traona (July 1642 – June 1643) and Tirano (1659), and was frequently appointed as a delegate or arbiter.

In 1649, Buol was raised to the imperial nobility under the name "Buol von Strassberg". He owned the small castle of Parpan, which he had entirely rebuilt.

== Bibliography ==
- A. von Sprecher, Stammbaum der Familie Buol, 1934 (2nd ed. 1940)
- S. Färber, Der bündnerische Herrenstand im 17. Jahrhundert, 1983
- P. Walser, "Drei Generationen der Davoser Familie Buol", in Bündner Jahrbuch, 1989, pp. 145–150
