= Paul Jenatsch =

Swiss politician (1629–1676)

Landamman of the League of the Ten Jurisdictions
- In office 1659–1660; 1663–1664; 1667–1668; 1671–1672; 1675–1676

Personal details
- Born: 29 April 1629
- Died: 13 December 1676 (aged 47)
- Spouses: Elisabeth von Valär (m. 1650); Jakobea Buol von Strassberg (m. 1669)
- Parent: Jörg Jenatsch

Paul Jenatsch (29 April 1629 – 13 December 1676) was a Swiss politician and military officer from Davos. The son of Jörg Jenatsch, he served several terms as landamman of the League of the Ten Jurisdictions and was a leading member of the Spanish party in the Republic of the Three Leagues.

== Life ==
Jenatsch studied at Zurich (1644) and Basel (1646–1647). He married Elisabeth von Valär in 1650 and, after her death, Jakobea Buol von Strassberg in 1669. He served as landamman of the League of the Ten Jurisdictions in 1659–1660, 1663–1664, 1667–1668, 1671–1672, and 1675–1676, and was podestà of Traona (1653–1655) and Tirano (1671–1673). He was sent on diplomatic missions on several occasions. A leading member of the Spanish party, he served as colonel in the Spanish service.

In 1666 he purchased Grünenstein Castle from the Prince-Abbot of St. Gallen.

He committed suicide on 13 December 1676.

== Bibliography ==
- F. Maissen, "Bundeslandammann Paul Jenatsch", in Bündner Monatsblatt, 1957, pp. 315–326.
