= Kettenbund =

17th-century Grisons secret league

The Kettenbund was a secret league of thirty-one Grisons officers and statesmen formed during the period of the Bündner Wirren. The alliance was concluded on 6 February 1637 at the house of Chur burgomaster Gregor Meyer, with the aim of driving the French out of the Grisons and reconquering the Valtellina.

Jörg Jenatsch, officially in the service of Duke Henri de Rohan, was not a member of the Kettenbund, although he supported it covertly. He commanded a force of 3,000 men that he advanced on 21 March 1637 against Rohan's entrenched position near Landquart. Betrayed, the duke capitulated on 26 March and was dismissed at Chur on 5 May with all the honors due to a friend of the Grisons.

== Bibliography ==
- Pieth, Friedrich. Bündnergeschichte, pp. 221–223.
