= Rudolf Anton Buol =

Austrian envoy and nobleman (1705–1765)

- Born: 1705
- Died: 1765 (aged 59–60)
- Spouse(s): Josepha, Baroness of Wenser
- Family: Buol

Rudolf Anton Buol (1705–1765) was an Austrian baron and diplomat from the Three Leagues who served as Austrian envoy to the cantons of Zurich, Bern, and Lucerne, and played a key role in negotiating the third capitulation of Milan of 1763.

== Life and career ==
Rudolf Anton Buol was born in 1705 into the Buol family of Sumvitg, a Catholic family of the Grey League. He was the son of Johann Anton Buol, president of the Grey League and major general in the Austrian service, and the brother of Johann Anton Buol.

He held senior offices in Vorarlberg and Tyrol, whose citizenship he acquired. As Austrian envoy to the Three Leagues, he was a particularly influential figure in diplomatic affairs. He negotiated the third capitulation of Milan in 1763. He married Josepha, Baroness of Wenser, and was himself raised to the rank of baron.

== Bibliography ==
- A. Maissen, Die Landrichter des Grauen Bundes, 1424–1797, 1990, pp. 94–95
