= Hercules Salis (died 1575) =

Grisons politician (1500–1575)

- Born: 1500
- Died: 1575 (aged 74–75)
- Occupation: Politician
- Spouses: Katharina von Marmels; Juliana von Capol
- Father: Anton Salis

Hercules Salis (1500–1575) was a politician from the Three Leagues, a member of the younger Chur line of the Salis family. He took over Rietberg Castle in 1554 and Campell Castle in 1567, was made a knight in 1568 and was governor of the Valtellina from 1571 to 1573.

== Biography ==
Hercules Salis was born in 1500, the son of Anton, of the younger Chur line of the Salis family. He married first Katharina von Marmels and then Juliana von Capol.

In 1554 Salis took over Rietberg Castle, and in 1567 Campell Castle. He was made a knight in 1568. From 1571 to 1573 he was governor (Landeshauptmann) of the Valtellina. In April 1572 a criminal court (Strafgericht) removed him from office, but in June the diet of the Three Leagues (Bundstag) decided to let him serve out his term. He died in 1575.

== Bibliography ==
- A. von Sprecher, Stammbaum der Familie von Salis (text volume), typescript, 1941 (Staatsarchiv Graubünden)
- A. Collenberg, Die Bündner Amtsleute in der Herrschaft Maienfeld 1509–1799 und in den Untertanenlanden Veltlin, Bormio und Chiavenna 1512–1797, 1999, 36
