= Rietberg Castle =

Castle in Switzerland

- Schloss Rietberg
- Pratval village, Domleschg
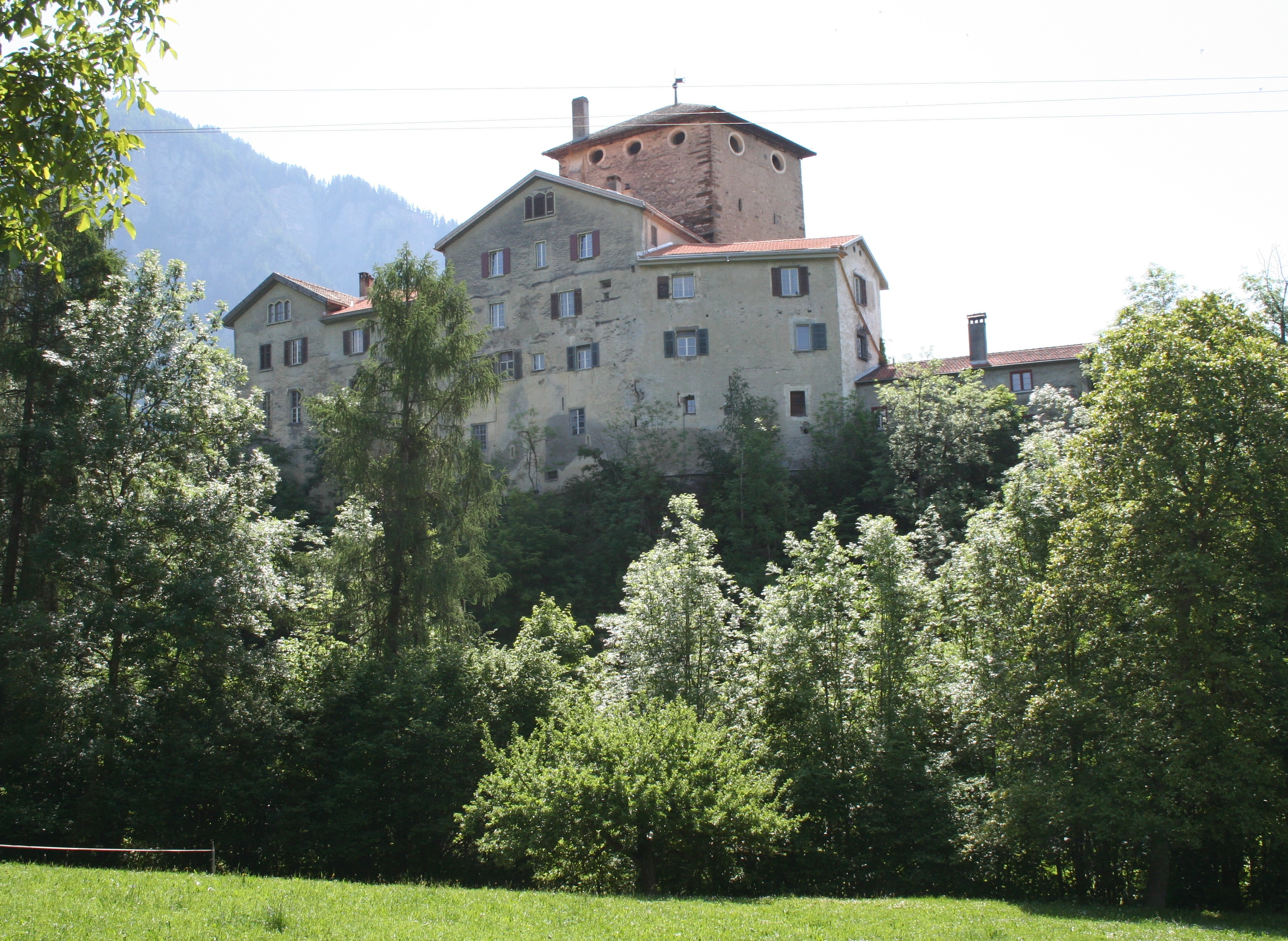
- Rietberg Castle

Site information
- Type: hill castle
- Code: CH-GR
- Condition: privately owned

Location
- Location within Canton of Graubünden Location within Switzerland
- Coordinates: 46°44′09″N 9°26′53″E
- Height: 723 m above the sea

Site history
- Built: early 13th century
- Materials: stone

Garrison information
- Occupants: Pompeius Planta

Rietberg Castle is a castle north of Pratval in the municipality of Domleschg of the Canton of Graubünden in Switzerland. It is a Swiss heritage site of national significance. It was the site of the murder of Pompeius Planta in 1621 by Jörg Jenatsch during the conflicts between Catholics and Protestants known as the Bündner Wirren.

== History ==
=== From foundation to the 17th century ===
The central tower and oldest part of the castle was built in the 13th century, though it may have been built around an earlier 12th-century tower. It was built for the Lords of Rietberg, who in 1286 were vassals of the Freiherr von Sax-Misox. In the 14th century they became vassals of the Bishop of Chur. At that time they held the castle and estates in Schams, Chur and Oberhalbstein and were the bishop's representative in Oberhalbstein and Oberengadin. The last male member of the Rietberg line, Johann von Reitberg, attempted to guarantee that the castle and his estates would pass to his wife, Berta von Rhäzüns, and to his relative Hermann von Landenberg. However, after his death in 1349 the Bishop of Chur claimed the castle. In 1353 he succeed in forcing the Landenbergs to sign away their claim to the castle and estates. Other claims to the castle continued to simmer until 1388 then the Bishop paid off the Lords of Rhäzüns and Lumerins to settle their claims.

The Bishop used the castle, its estates and the office of vogt as collateral for loans from a number of wealthy families or as a reward for gifts from those same families. In 1384 Eglolf von Juvalt lived in the castle. In 1398 the bishop mortgaged the castle to Jakob von Castelmur for 500 silver marks. It was mortgaged again in 1409 to Conradin Rambach and the cathedral chapter, again in 1426 to Bartolomäus Planta and in 1447 to Hans Wellenberg. In 1450 it was mortgaged to Hans Ringg, who passed it to his son Wilhelm in 1483. It continued to be used as collateral into the 16th and 17th centuries. Around 1530 it went to Anton von Travers, followed by Hercules von Salis in 1554. In 1617, parts of the estate were inherited by the Planta family.

=== Murder of Pompeius Planta ===
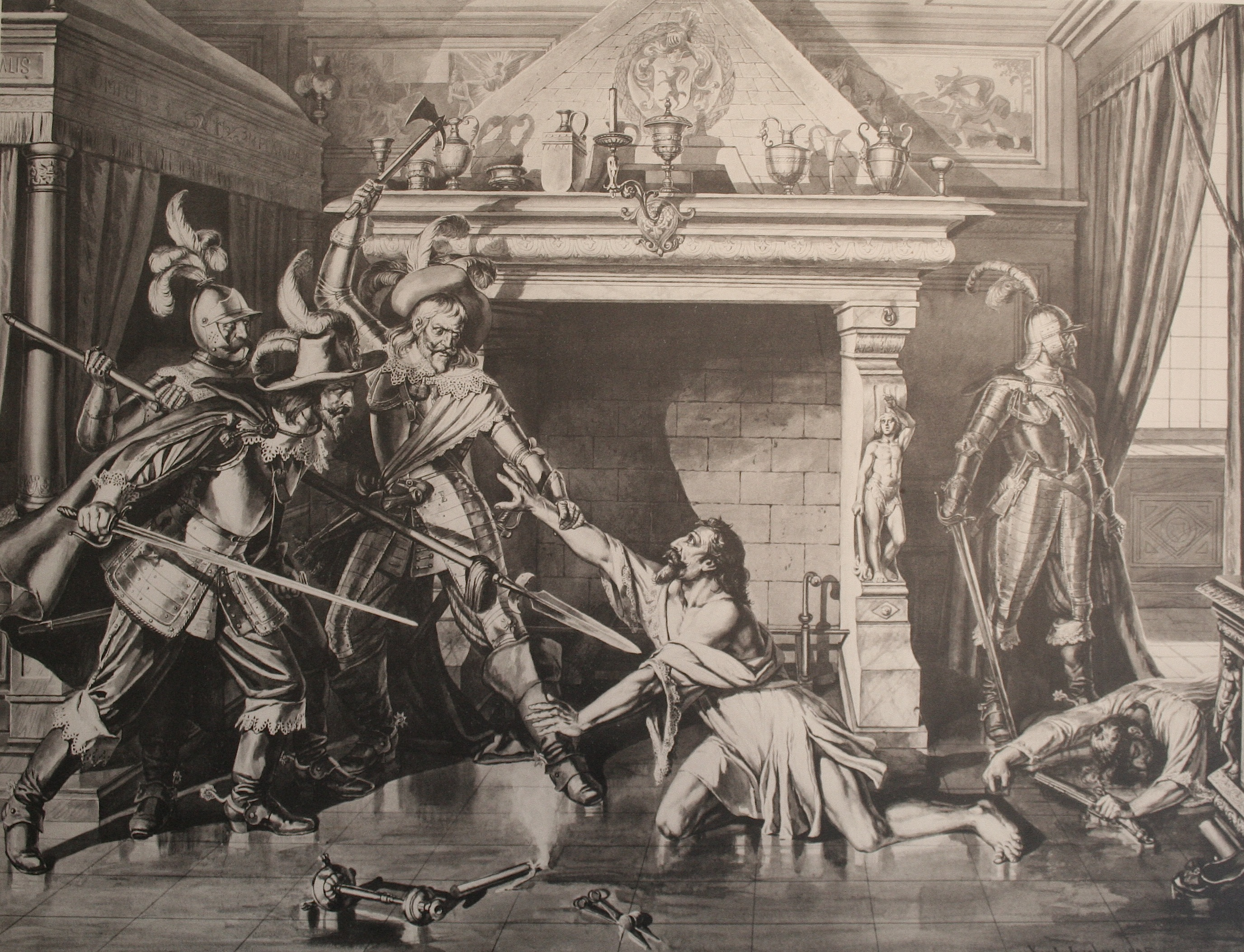
The murder of Planta by Karl Jauslin.

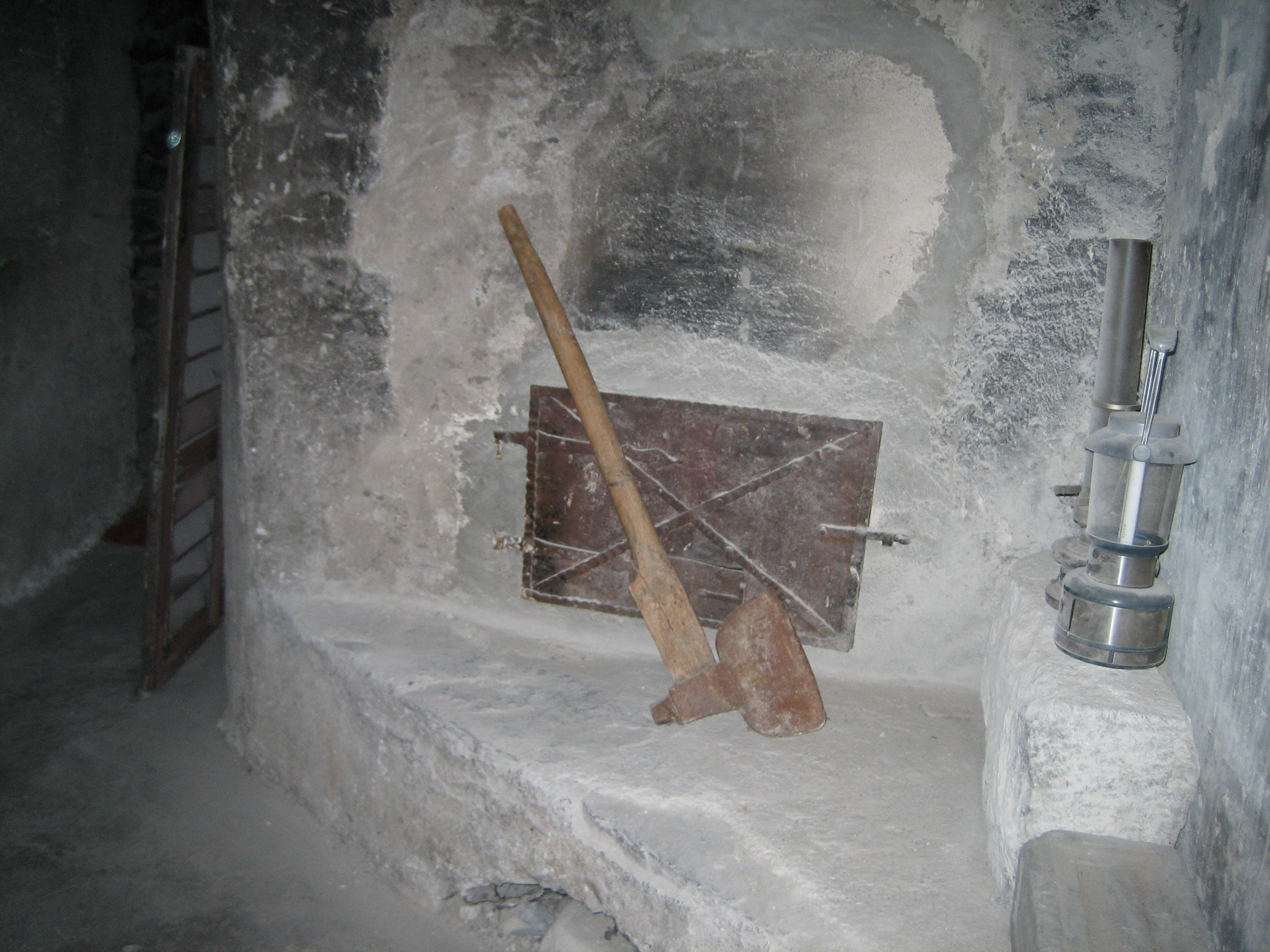
The fireplace in the tower when Planta was killed.

During the Bündner Wirren, the castle was home to Pompeius Planta who was a prominent member of the Catholic, pro-Habsburg faction in the Three Leagues. In 1618, the young radical Jörg Jenatsch became a member of the court of 'clerical overseers' and a leader of the anti-Habsburg faction. The popular court in Thusis, which was associated with the overseers, outlawed many leading men from the pro-Habsburg faction, notably Rudolf Planta and his brother Pompeius Planta. With the support of the anti-Habsburg court, armed mobs attacked and arrested several pro-Habsburg leaders including the archpriest Nicholas Rusca and the provost Johann Baptista who was known as Zambra. The Planta brothers escaped the mob, but their estates were burned. The mobs brought the captured men to the court in Thusis. Zambra was accused of conspiring with the Spanish, convicted and executed. Nicholas Rusca was beaten and died before the court could sentence him to death. The court also handed down 157 convictions against men who had escaped the mobs.

In 1620, Catholic forces attacked and killed between 500 and 600 Protestants in the Valtellina valley. Around the same time Pompeius Planta returned to Rietburg believing that enough time had passed. However, on 24 February 1621, a force of anti-Habsburg troops led by Jörg Jenatsch assembled to attack the castle in retaliation for the killings in Valtellina. Early in the morning on 25 February, the troops attacked the castle and killed Pompeius Planta as he attempted to flee. According to one version of the story, Pompeius attempted to hide in a chimney, but was discovered by a dog. He was attacked by the raiders and killed by Jenatsch with an axe. Years later, Jenatsch converted to Catholicism and on 24 January 1639, he was killed during Carnival in Chur by an unknown attacker who was dressed as a bear. The attacker may have been a son of Pompeius Planta or an assassin hired by the local aristocracy. According to legend he was killed by the same axe that he used on Pompeius.

=== After the 17th century ===
In 1617 the castle and associated titles were shared between the Salis family and Pompeius Planta, who had married into the Salis family. After his death, the ownership remained divided until 1664 when the Salis family sold their share to Christoph von Rosenroll for 9000 gulden. Christoph's son sold the half share to the Buol family in 1670. Nearly a century later, in 1758, the Buols bought the Planta family's share and became the sole owner of the castle.

In 1798 Johann von Buol-Schauenstein sold the castle to his brother, the Bishop of Chur Karl Rudolf. The Bishop's plans to turn the castle into a seminary ended with the 1798 French invasion of Switzerland and the end of the Prince-Bishops' power under the Helvetic Republic. In the 19th century it passed through a number of owners before ending up with the Casparis family in 1822. In 1917 it was inherited by a branch of the Planta family. Today it is privately owned by the families Bürge & Hämmerle.

The knight-hall apartment was renovated in 2018 and is now a guest accommodation www.ferienresidenz-von-planta.com

== Castle site ==
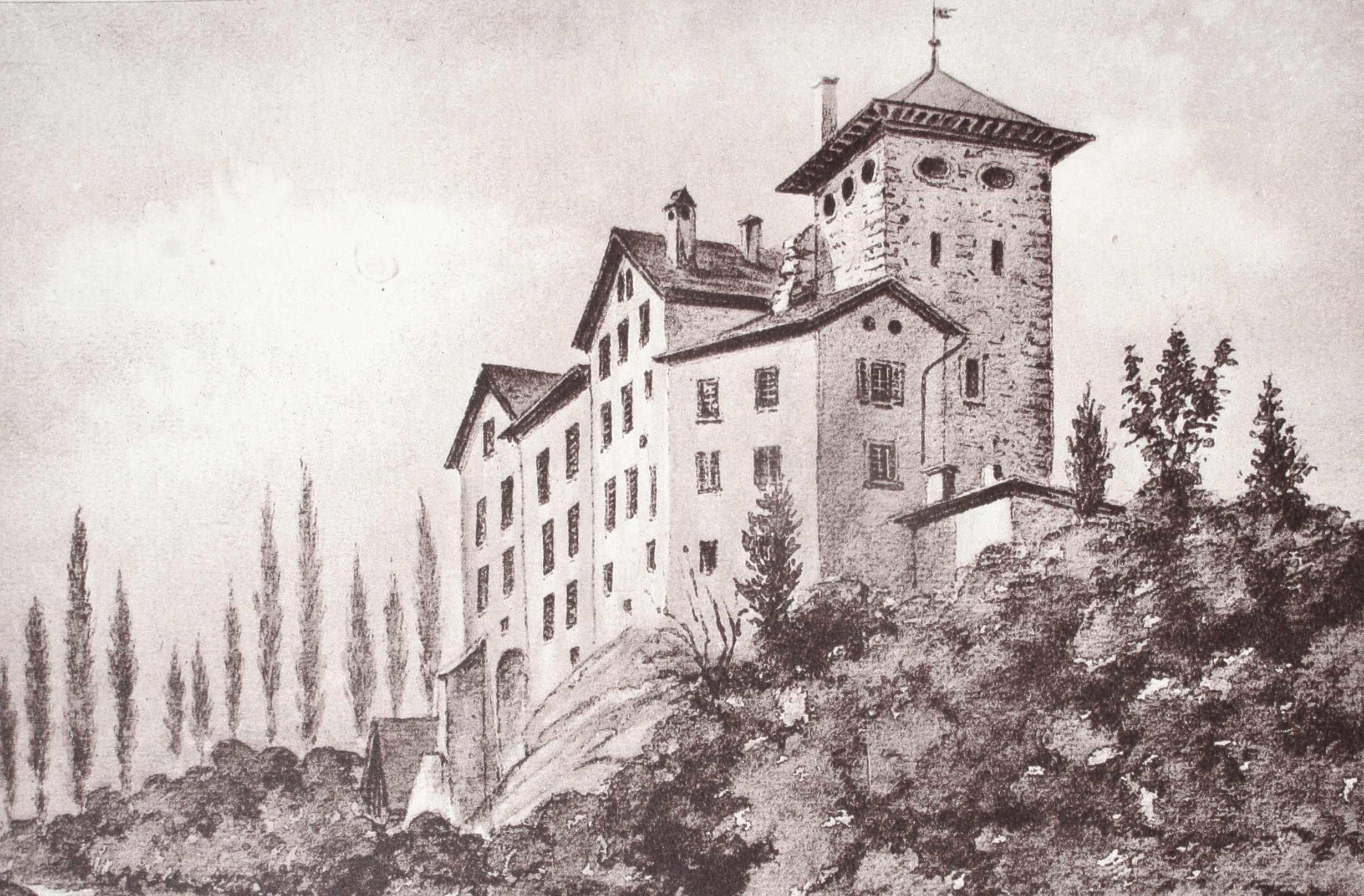
The castle in 1880

The rectangular tower from the 13th century has walls that are up to 2.5 m (8.2 ft) thick. The original entrance was probably on the third story of this tower. the tower crenelations were filled in on three sides during the 18th century. The current tower roof was added in the last century. The tower is flanked to the north by two residential buildings which have medieval foundations. However, they were completely rebuilt in the 17th and 18th centuries. The current appearance of the castle dates back to the 17th century. The cistern, in the courtyard north-east of the tower, was built during the Middle Ages. A Baroque round tower was built over the cistern in the 17th century. Today the cistern can be reached by tunnel from the residential wing. In the 17th century a crenelated ring wall was added to the castle.

== Gallery ==
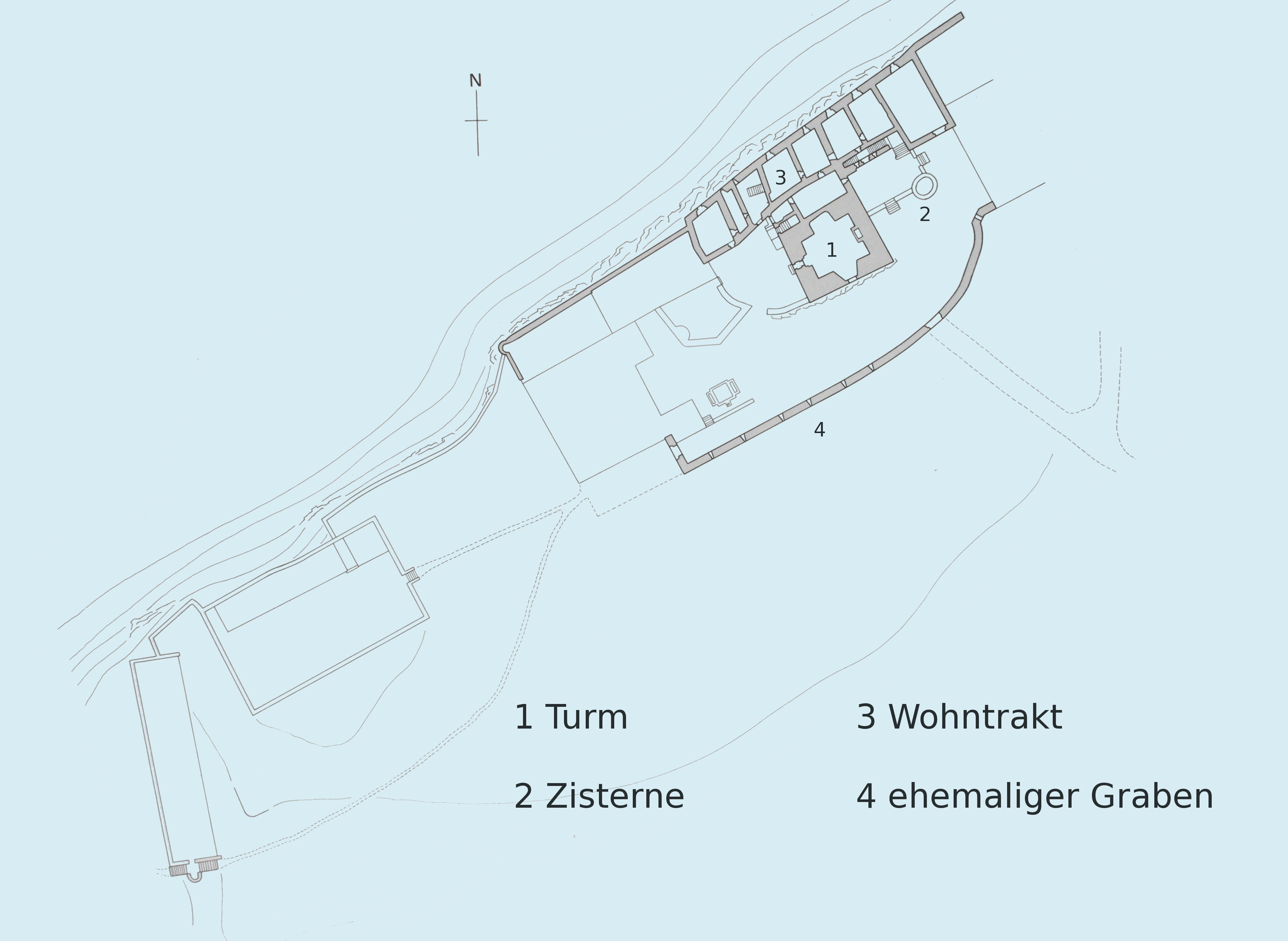
Castle floorplan

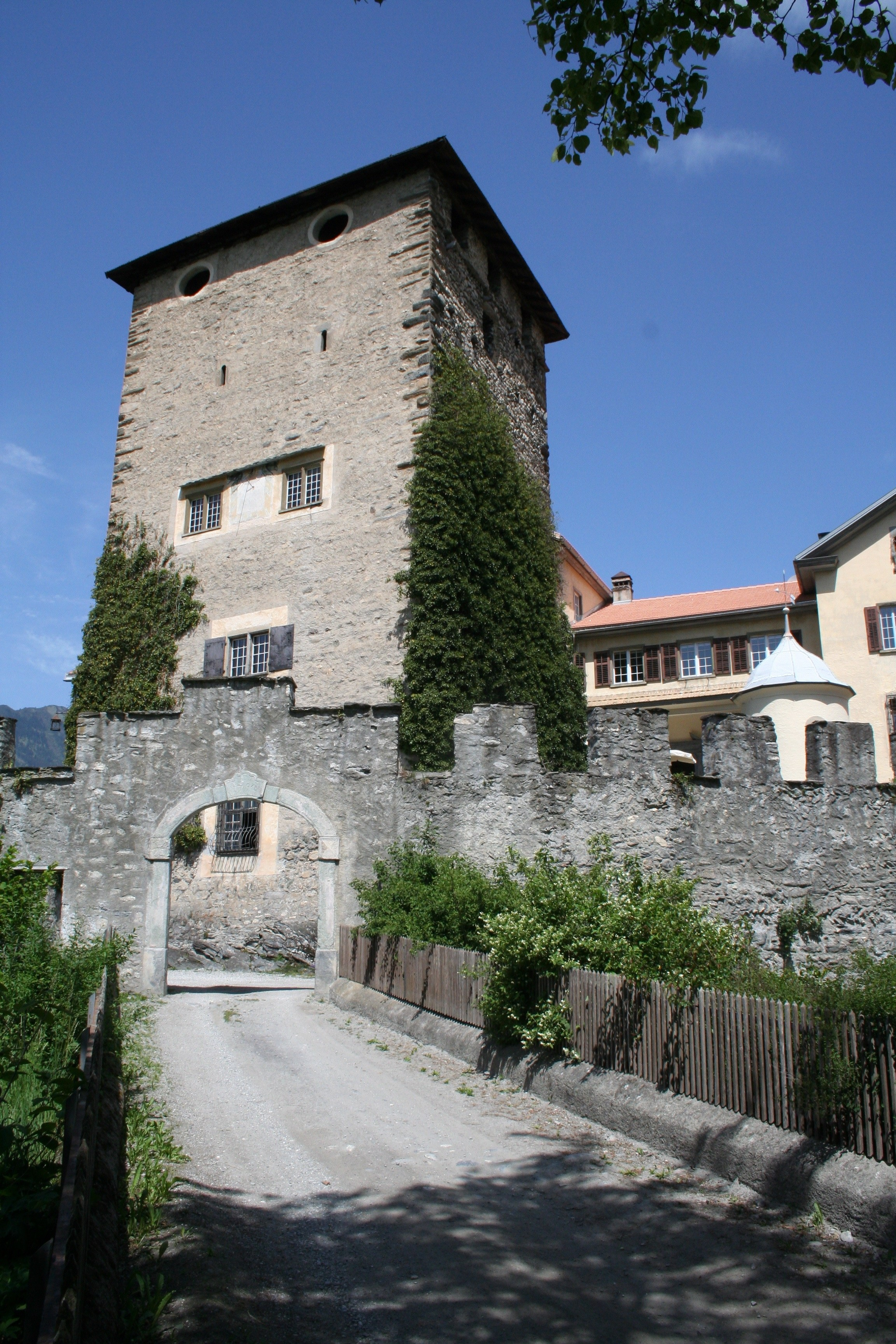
17th century castle wall and gate

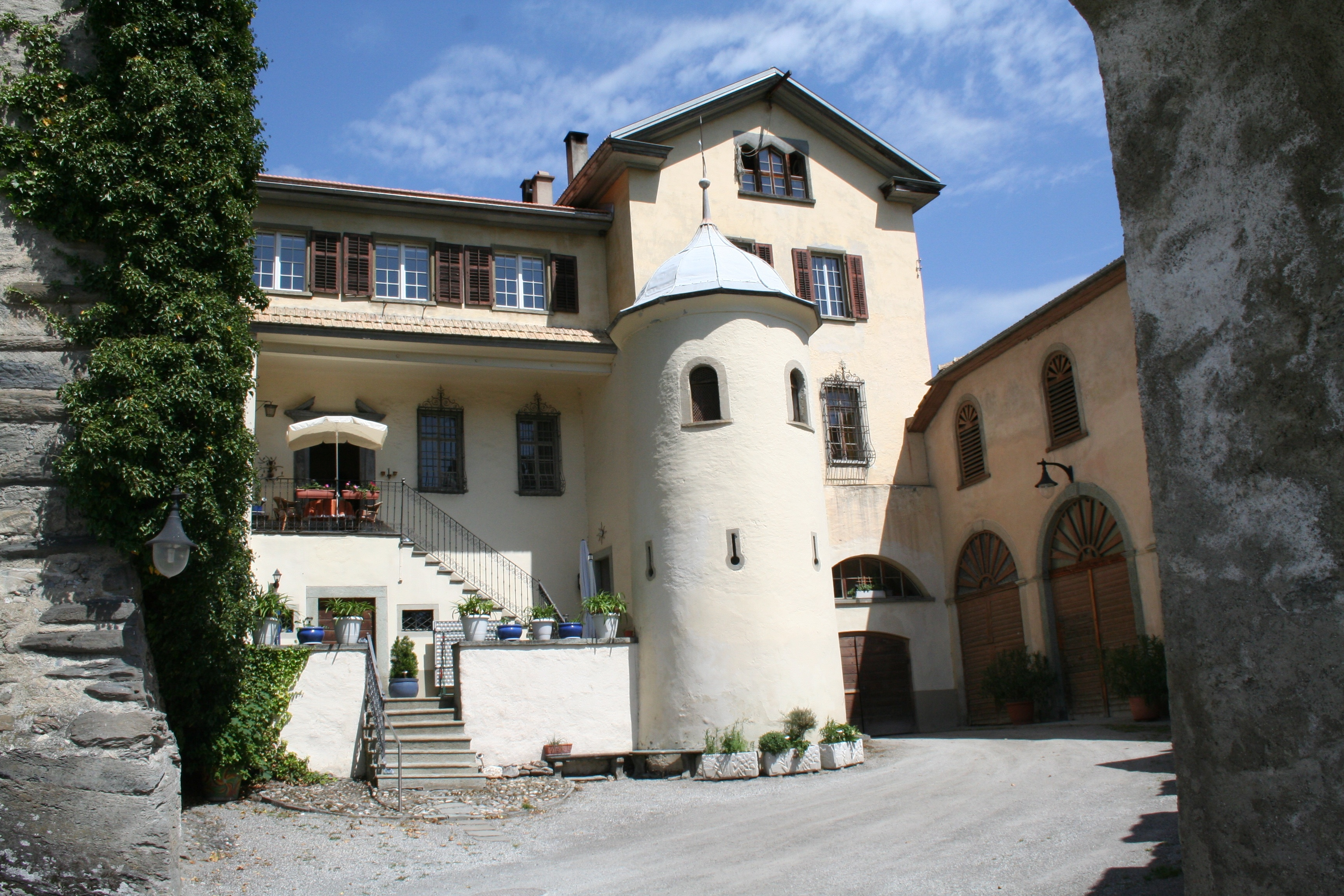
Courtyard and round tower

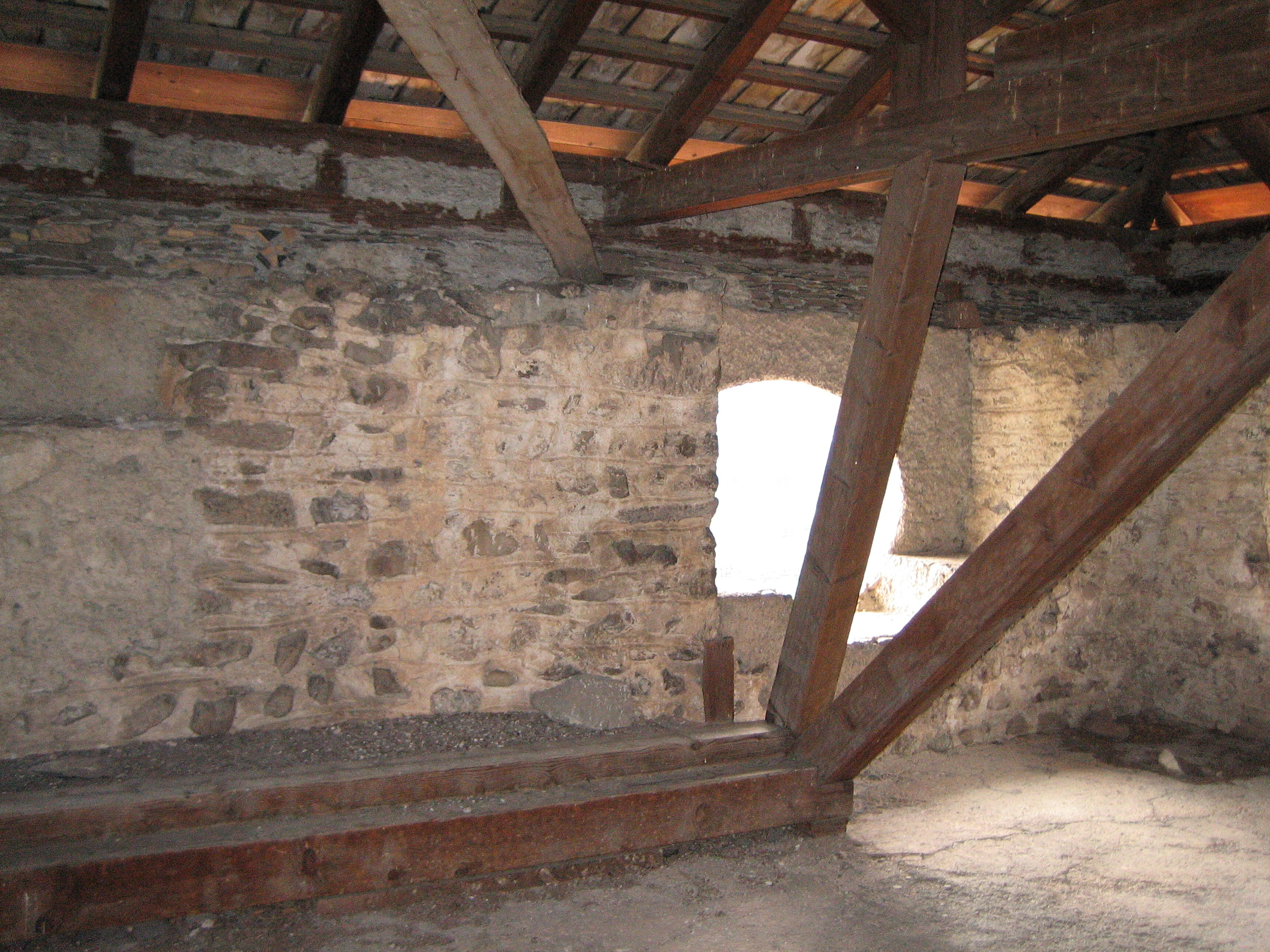
Interior of the main tower

== See also ==
- List of castles in Switzerland
