= Bündner Wirren =

Military conflict

The Bündner Wirren
- Part of the Thirty Years' War
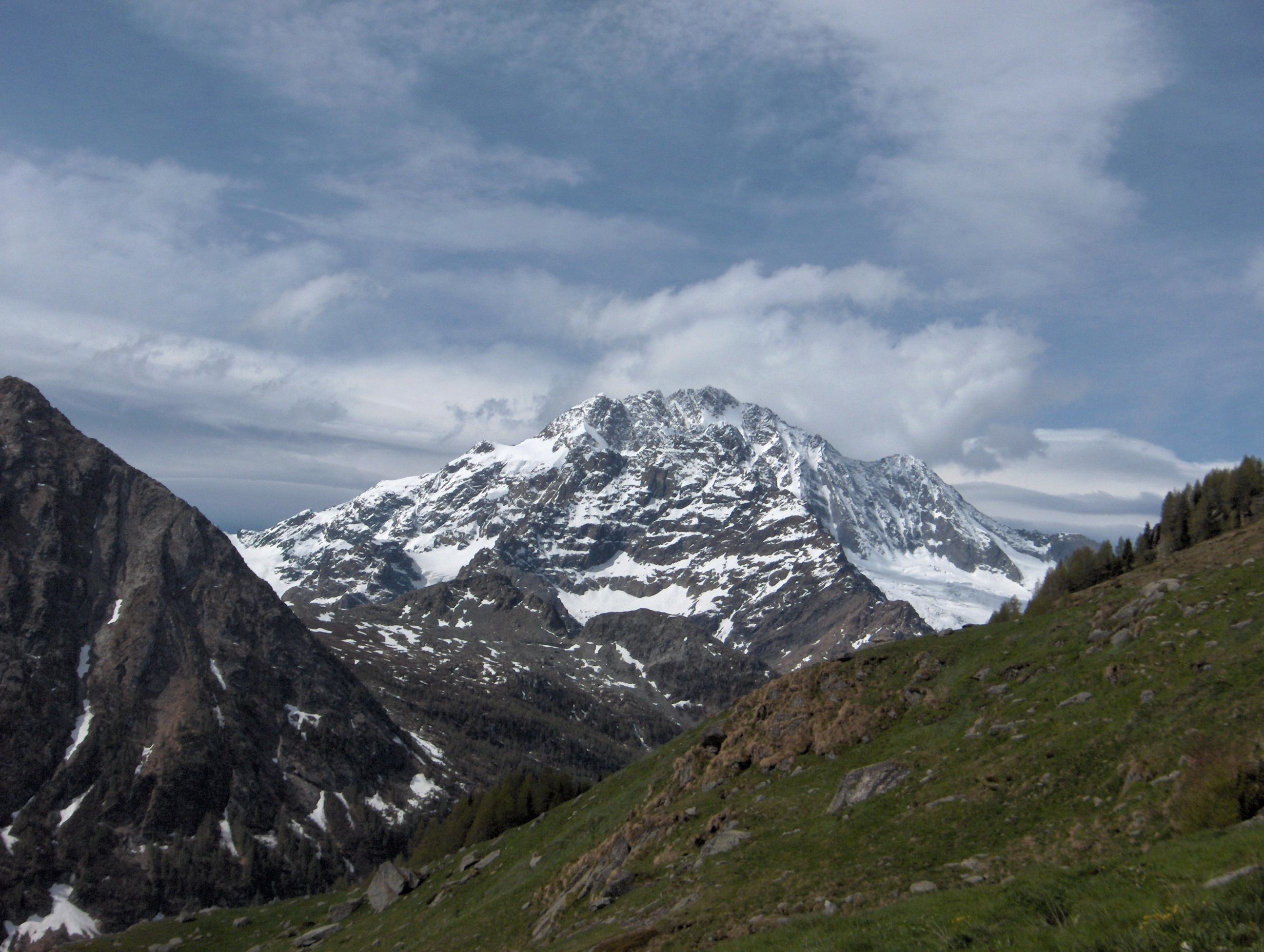
- Monte Disgrazia 3,678m; the Valtellina Pass
Date	1618–1639
Location	Swiss canton of Graubünden
Result	The Three Leagues regain control of the Valtellina but allow free exercise of the Catholic faith.

Belligerents
The Three Leagues; Kingdom of France; Venice; Duchy of Savoy	Grison rebels Holy Roman Empire; Spain

Commanders and leaders
Jörg Jenatsch † (Kingdom of France) Henri de Rohan (Kingdom of France) François Annibal d'Estrées	(Spain) Pompeius Planta † (Spain) Gómez de Feria (Papal States) Torquato Conti (Holy Roman Empire) Freiherr von Fernemont (Holy Roman Empire) Archduke Leopold

The Bündner Wirren (Romansh: Scumbigls grischuns/Scumpigls grischuns/Sgurdins grischuns, French: Troubles des Grisons, Italian: Torbidi grigionesi, English: Graubünden disturbances or Revolt of the Leagues) was a conflict that lasted between 1618 and 1639 in what is now the Swiss canton of Graubünden.

Initially a revolt by local Catholics against their Protestant overlords, many regional powers became involved as it potentially affected control of the Valtellina alpine passes. A loose alliance of France, Venice, and the Duchy of Savoy supported the Three Leagues against the Grison rebels, backed by the Habsburg monarchy. The conflict threatened to draw the Swiss Confederation into the Thirty Years War.

== Background ==
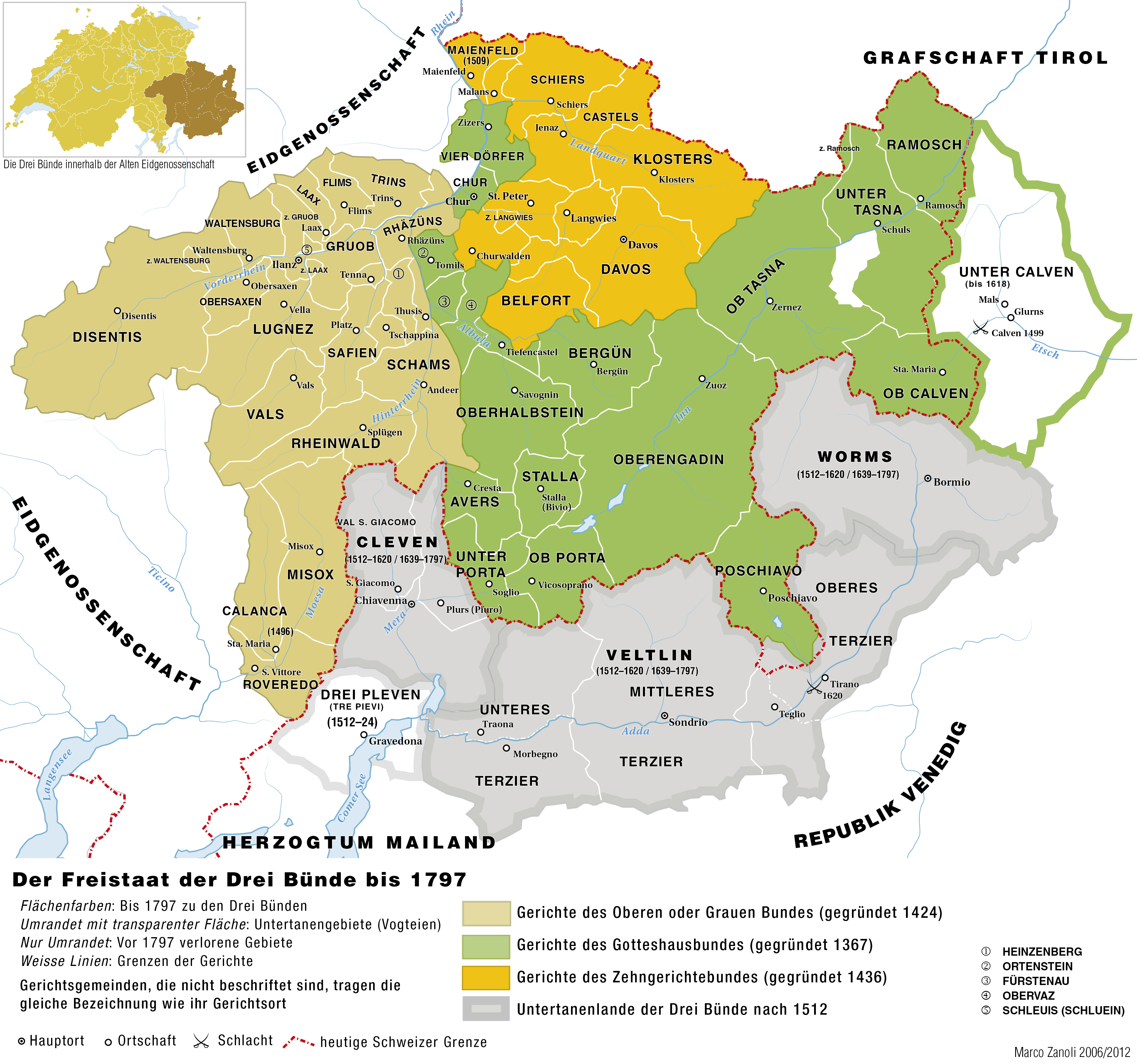
Map of the Three Leagues and surrounding lands

The Three Leagues were a federation of three states (the League of God's House, the League of the Ten Jurisdictions, and the Grey League) in the alpine valleys around the city of Chur. Due to their position, they controlled a number of key alpine passes. The League was also not a unified state and virtually all external affairs were settled by referendum.

At the beginning of the 17th century, the regional powers around the Leagues attempted to secure transit and trade routes through the League passes. For France and Venice the alpine passes represented important trade routes. For the Austrian Habsburgs, they were the shortest route between Habsburg controlled Milan and Austrian Tyrol. In 1602, France secured some of the alpine passes. A year later Venice bought the transit right through the passes and an alliance for 10 years. This agreement between the Leagues and Venice angered the Spanish Habsburgs. In Milan, Don Pedro Henriquez de Acevedo, Count of Fuentes declared an embargo against the Leagues and built a fortification, the Forte di Fuentes, at Montecchio on Lake Como at the entrance to the League controlled Valtellina valley. Politically, the Leagues were split into pro-Habsburg and pro-Venice parties. In 1607, about 6,000 armed men met together in a bitter Landsgemeinde or cantonal assembly. A court was set up that initially supported the French-Venetian faction and pronounced judgments against the Habsburg faction for a variety of crimes. Shortly thereafter the Habsburg faction gained power and returned judgments against the French-Venetian side.

At the same time, the Protestant and even a few Catholic representatives turned their ire on the Bishop of Chur, Giovanni or Johann V of Flugi. They criticized the Bishop for working against the interests of the Leagues and for living outside the Diocese in Feldkirch or at Fürstenburg in Vintschgau. The citizens then got a court to issue an arrest warrant for the Bishop. In response, the Bishop fled to Feldkirch and refused to return and face a trial. The Bishop remained in exile until 1610, but the trial of the Bishop illustrated the religious and secular conflicts in the Leagues. After the Bishop returned, he was forced to flee twice more, once in 1612 and a second time in 1617.

== Jörg Jenatsch and Valtellina murders ==
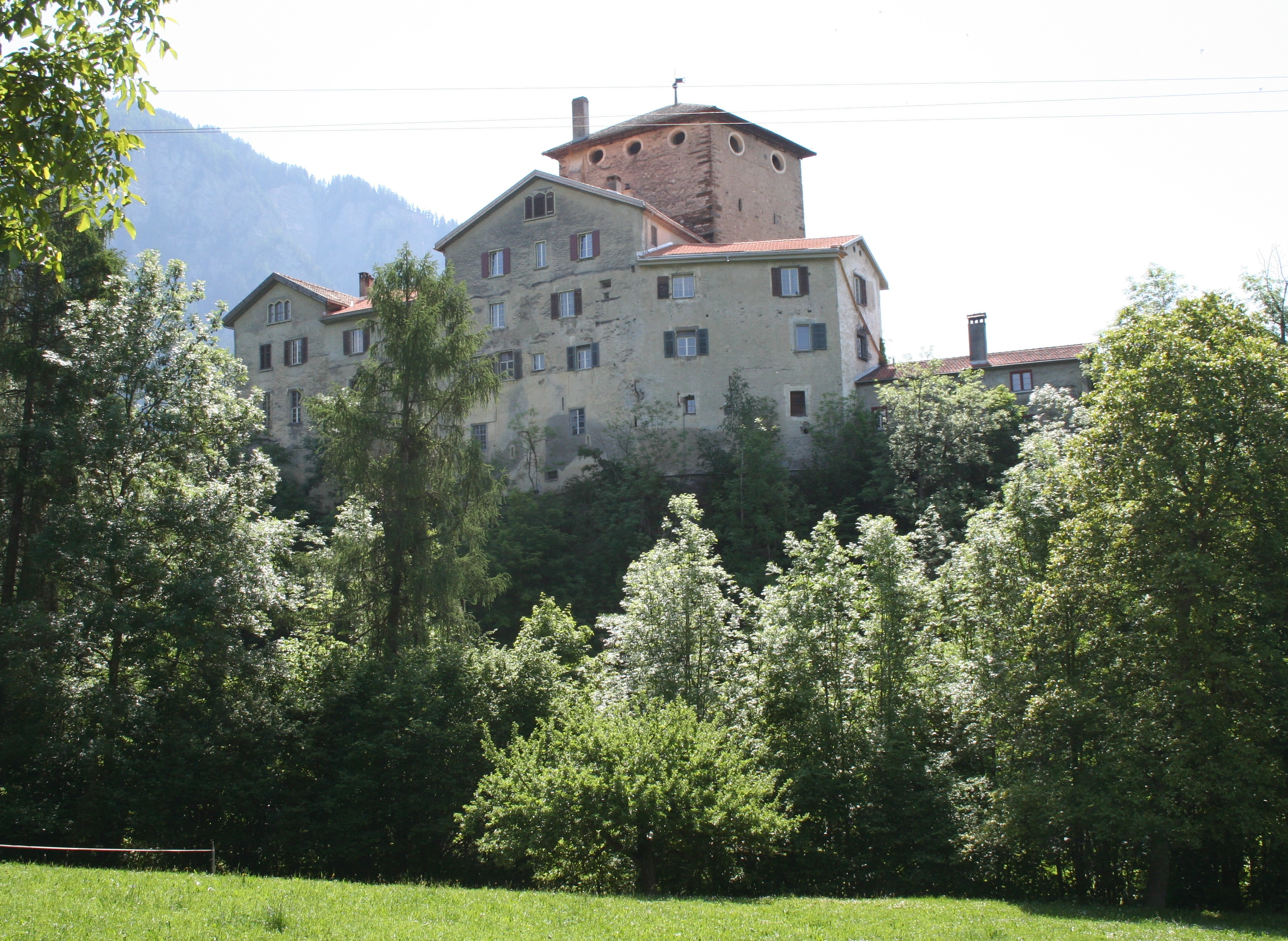
Rietberg Castle, home of Pompeius Planta

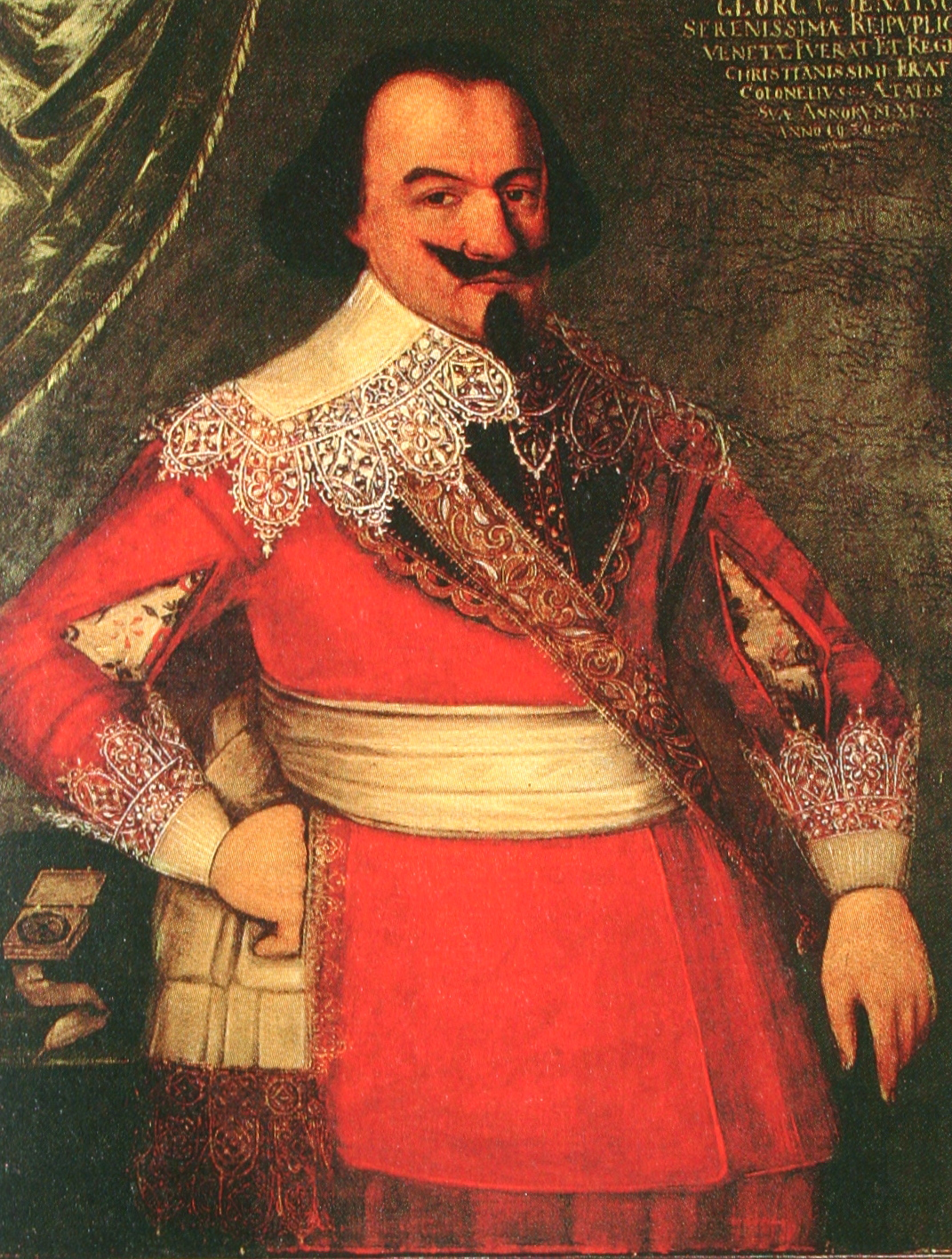
Jörg Jenatsch

In 1618, the young radical Jörg Jenatsch became a member of the court of 'clerical overseers' and a leader of the anti-Habsburg faction. The popular court in Thusis, which was associated with the overseers, outlawed many leading men from the pro-Habsburg faction, notably Rudolf Planta and his brother Pompeius Planta. With the support of the anti-Habsburg court, armed mobs attacked and arrested several pro-Habsburg leaders including the archpriest Nicholas Rusca and the provost at Johann Baptista who was known as Zambra. The Planta brothers escaped the mob, but their estates were burned. The mobs brought the captured men to the court in Thusis. Zambra was accused of conspiring with the Spanish, convicted, and executed. Nicholas Rusca was beaten and died before the court could sentence him to death. The court also handed down 157 convictions against men who had escaped the mobs.

The harsh judgments of the Thusis court against a number of Catholics in the Valtellina led to a conspiracy to drive the Protestants out of this southern valley. The leader of the conspiracy, Giacomo Robustelli of the Planta family, had ties to Madrid, Rome, and Paris. On the evening of 18/19 July 1620, a force of Valtellina rebels supported by Imperial and Spanish troops marched into Tirano and began killing Protestants. When they finished in Tirano, they marched to Teglio, Sondrio, and further down the valley killing every Protestant that they found. Between 500 and 600 people were killed on that night and in the following four days. The attack drove nearly all the Protestants out of the valley, prevented further Protestant incursions, and took the Valtellina out of the Three Leagues.

During 1620, Pompeius Planta, believing that enough time had passed, returned home to Rietberg Castle. However, on 24 February 1621, a force of anti-Habsburg troops led by Jörg Jenatsch assembled to attack the castle. Early in the morning on 25 February, the troops attacked the castle and killed Pompeius Planta as he attempted to flee. According to one version of the story, Pompeius attempted to hide in a chimney, but was discovered by a dog. He was attacked by the raiders and killed by Jörg Jenatsch with an axe.

== Catholic response ==
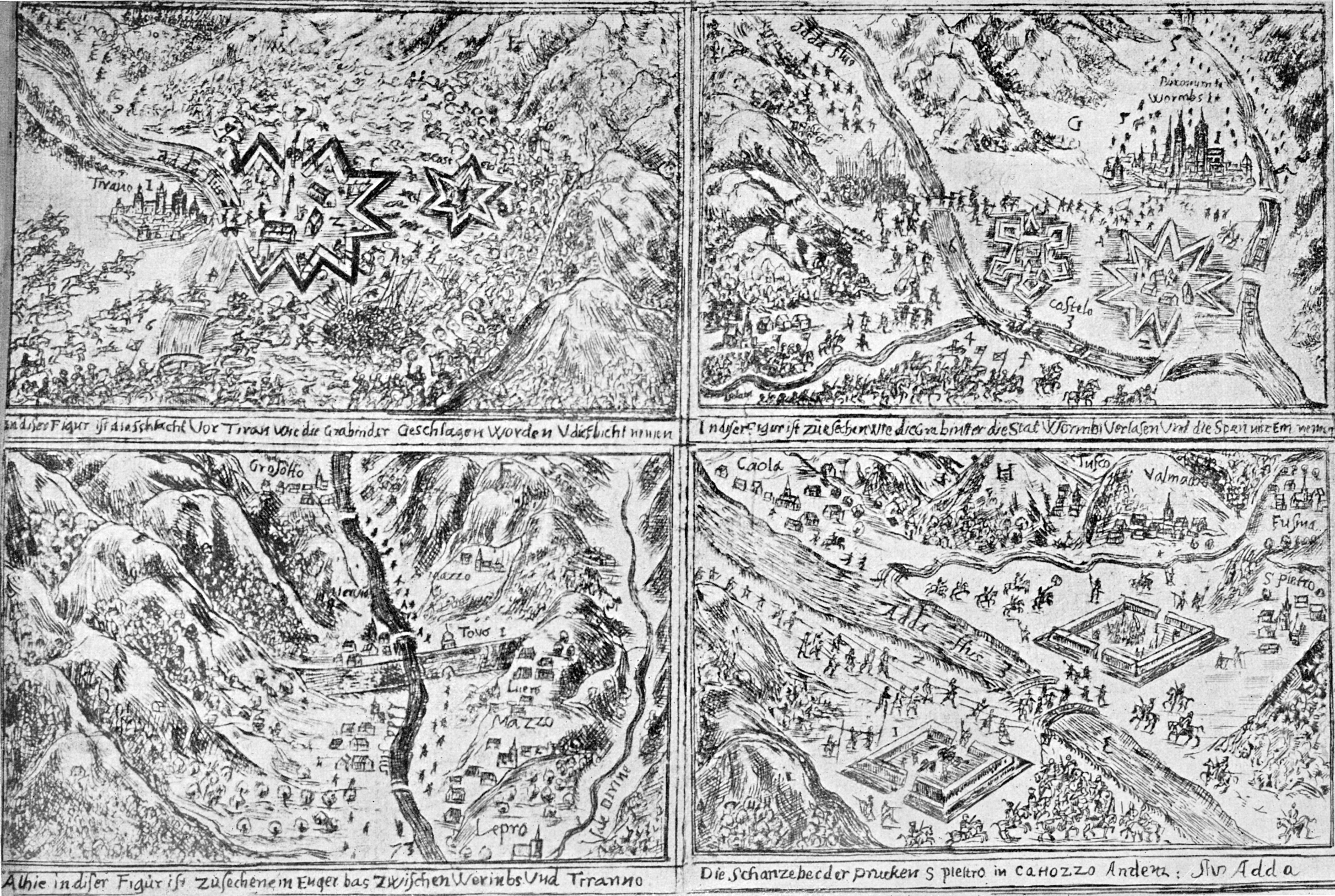
Drawings of the League/Duke Henri de Rohan invasion of the Valtellina.

Emboldened by the murder of Pompeius Planta, the Protestant forces in the Three Leagues assembled an army to retake the Valtellina and other subject lands. The army was thrown together from a number of villages and was poorly armed and led. They slowly marched toward Bormio. However, before they even reached the town, the army disintegrated and the remnants returned to the Leagues. This attempted invasion gave the Spanish and Austrians an excuse to invade the Leagues. By the end of October, Spain and Austria had occupied all of Graubunden. The allied Swiss Confederation was divided along religious lines and only Bern and Zurich sent help. The Catholic central Swiss cantons intervened under the abbot of Disentis on the side of the Spaniards and Austrians. In January 1622, Graubünden had to cede the Müstair, the Lower Engadine, and Prättigau valleys. The treaty also forbade the Protestant religion in these valleys. In response, in 1622, the Prättigau valley rebelled against the Austrians and drove them out of the valley. The Austrians invaded the valley twice more, attempting to reimpose the Catholic faith, in 1623-24 and 1629–31.

In 1622 the Catholic Congregation for the Evangelization of Peoples appointed the Capuchins to spread Catholicism in the region. On 24 April 1622, the leader of the Capuchin mission, Fidelis of Sigmaringen, was murdered by Protestant peasants while on his way from Sewis to Grüsch near Chur. His death ended the first Capuchin missionary effort. A second attempt to convert Misocco and Calanca was undertaken by the Capuchins in 1635.

In 1623 the Leagues entered into an alliance with France, Savoy, and Venice. Cardinal Richelieu saw the Valtellina as an opportunity to weaken the Spanish. Jürg Jenatsch and Ulysses von Salis used French money to hire an 8,000 man mercenary army and drive out the Austrians. The peace treaty of Monzon (5 March 1626) between France and Spain confirmed the political and religious independence of the Valtellina. In 1627 the French withdrew from the Valtellina valley, which was then occupied by Papal troops. Starting in 1631 the League, under the French Duke Henri de Rohan, started to expel the Spaniards. However, Richelieu still did not want to hand the valley over to its residents. When it became clear that the French intended to remain permanently in the Leagues, but would not force the Valtellina to convert to Protestantism, Jürg Jenatsch (now a mercenary leader) converted in 1635 to the Catholic faith. In 1637, he rebelled and allied with Austria and Spain. His rebellion along with the rebellion of 31 other League officers forced the French to withdraw without a fight.

== End ==
On 24 January 1639, Jürg Jenatsch was killed during Carnival by an unknown attacker who was dressed as a bear. The attacker may have been a son of Pompeius Planta or an assassin hired by the local aristocracy. According to legend he was killed by the same axe that he used on Pompeius Planta. On 3 September 1639 the Leagues agreed with Spain to bring the Valtellina back under League sovereignty, but with the promise to respect the free exercise of the Catholic faith. Treaties with Austria in 1649 and 1652, brought the Müstair and Lower Engadine valleys back under the authority of the Three Leagues.
