= Johann Anton Buol von Schauenstein =

Swiss baron and politician (1710–1771)

President of the Grey League
- In office 1744, 1750, 1753, 1764

Landammann of the high jurisdiction of Disentis
- In office 1743–1745

Personal details
- Born: 1710
- Died: 28 March 1771 (aged 60–61)
- Spouse: Eleonora Tschidera von Gleissheim
- Parent: Johann Anton Buol von Schauenstein (father)

Johann Anton Buol von Schauenstein (1710 – 28 March 1771) was a Swiss baron and politician from Sumvitg in the Grey League.

== Life ==
Buol von Schauenstein was the son of Johann Anton Buol von Schauenstein, president of the Grey League and major-general in Austrian service. His brother was Rudolf Anton Buol. He married Eleonora Tschidera von Gleissheim. He was educated at the Jesuit college in Feldkirch.

== Career ==
Buol von Schauenstein served as Landammann of the high jurisdiction of Disentis from 1743 to 1745, and was president of the Grey League in 1744, 1750, 1753, and 1764. In 1742 he inherited the title of baron of Schauenstein (and Ehrenfels), as well as the lordships of Reichenau and Tamins, from a childless maternal uncle, Count Franz Thomas von Schauenstein. As castellan and proprietor of a toll at the bridge of Reichenau, he ventured into mining without much success.

== Bibliography ==
- A. Maissen, Die Landrichter des Grauen Bundes 1424–1797, 1990, 94–95.
