= Jörg Jenatsch =

Swiss political leader (1596–1639)

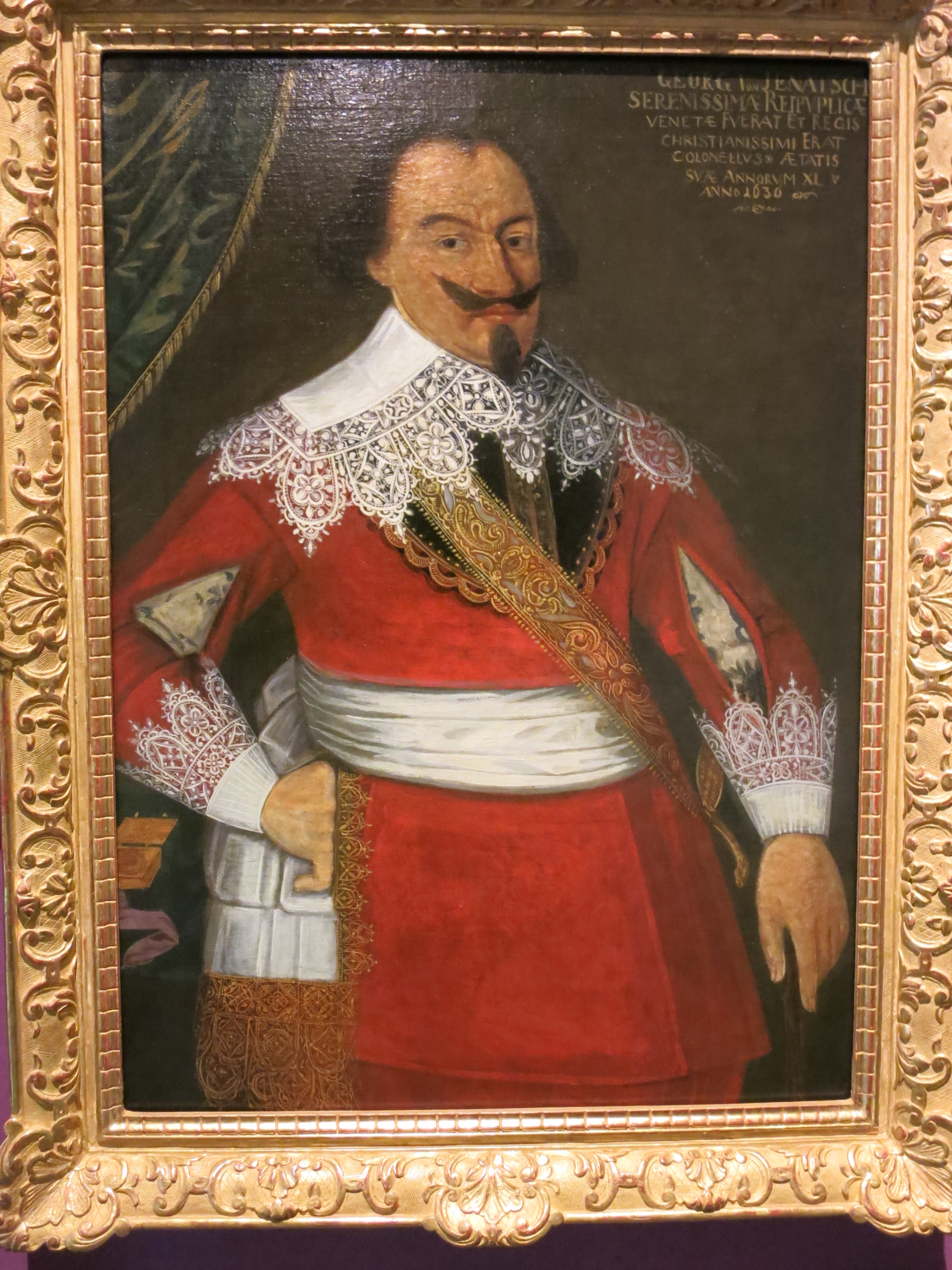
- 1636 portrait of Jenatsch
- Born: 1596; Samedan, Free State of the Three Leagues
- Died: 24 January 1639 (aged 42–43); Chur, Free State of the Three Leagues
- Occupation: Political leader
- Years active: 1617–1639

Jörg Jenatsch, also called Jürg or Georg Jenatsch (1596 – 24 January 1639), was a Swiss political leader during the Thirty Years' War, one of the most striking figures in the troubled history of the Grisons in the 17th century.

== Protestant leader ==
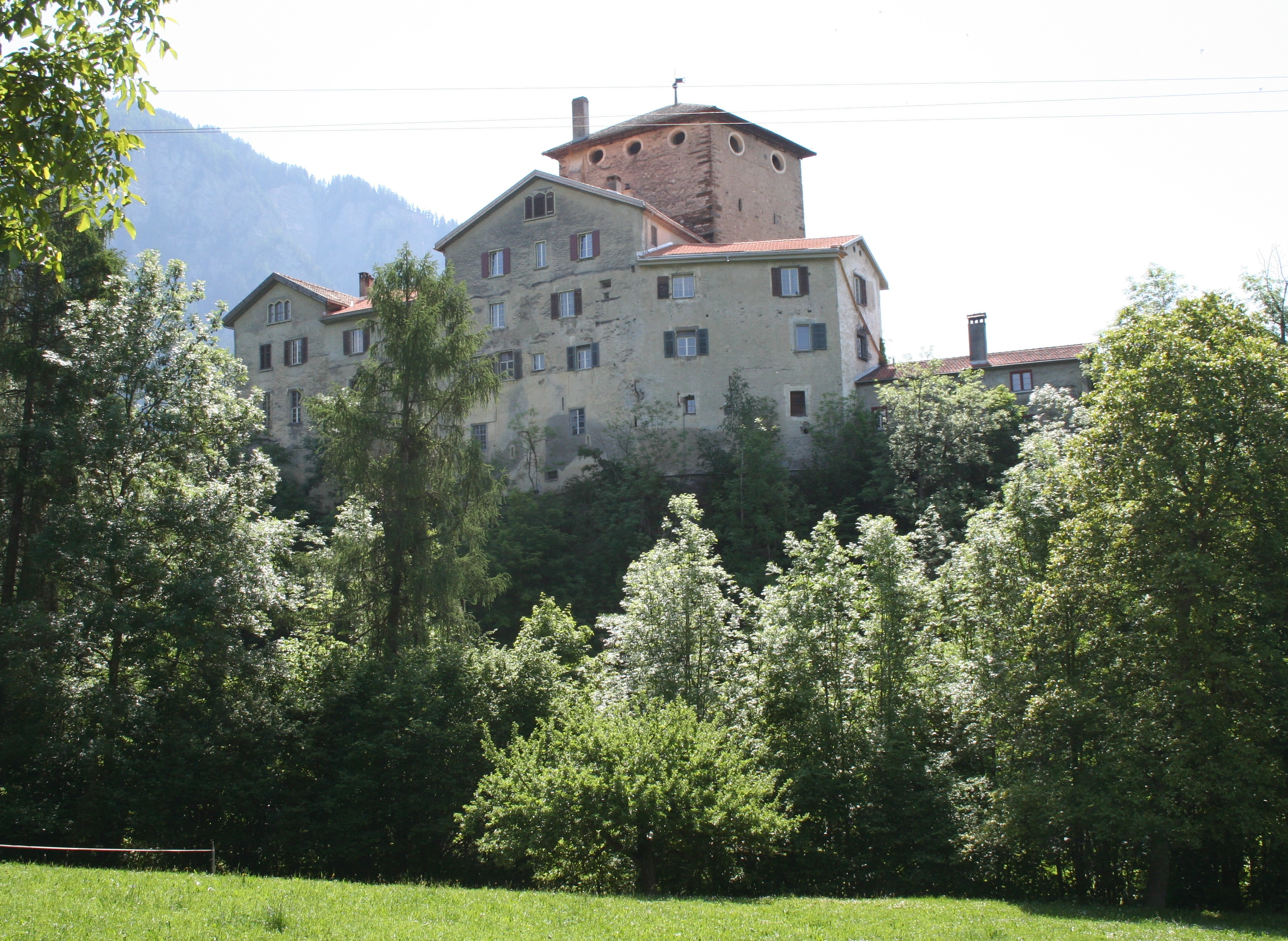
Rietberg Castle, home of Pompeius Planta

He was probably born in Lohn, or Samedan in the Upper Engadine. His childhood was spent in Silvaplana, before studying theology at Zürich and Basel, and in 1617 he became the Protestant pastor of Scharans (near Thusis) on the Protestant-Catholic border. Almost at once he plunged into active politics, taking the side of the Venetian and Protestant party associated primarily with the Salis family in the region, against the pro-Spanish Habsburgs and Catholic policy supported by the rival faction, headed by members of the Planta family.

He became one of the board of Protestant 'clerical overseers' and a leader of the anti-Spanish faction. In 1618 he supervised the torture to death of the arch-priest Nicola Rusca of Sondrio. The popular court in Thusis associated with the overseers also outlawed many leading men from the Spanish faction, notably Rudolf von Planta and his brother Pompeius von Planta. A subsequent popular court in the region's capital, Chur, rejected the Thusis verdicts, and the Republic of the Grisons slid towards anarchy in what became known as the Bündner Wirren or the Confusion of Graubünden. In 1620, an uprising coordinated with the Spanish governor in Milan resulted in the massacre of a number of Protestants in the Republic's subject territory in the Valtellina, a fertile valley of considerable strategic importance (for through it the Spaniards in Milan could communicate by the Umbrail Pass and the Stelvio Pass with the Austrians in Tirol). From 1620 to 1639, control over the Valtellina became a bone of contention among Spain, Venice and France, with the Republic of the Grisons unable to reassert its control.

== Murders ==
Jenatsch took part in the brutal murder (1621) of Pompeius von Planta, the head of the rival party, at his castle, Rietberg. Planta was left pinned to the floor with an axe, though the actual murderer was most likely Niklaus Carl von Hohenbalcken. Soon after, Jenatsch and many others associated with the Reformed church, Venice, or the Salis family had to flee the country. After the murder of Planta and several other violent incidents, Jenatsch also lost his position as a pastor, and henceforth acted solely as a soldier and military entrepreneur. He participated in the revolt against the Austrians in the Prättigau (1622), and in the invasion of the Valtellina by a French army (1624), but the peace made (1626) between France and Spain left the Valtellina in the hands of the pope, and so thwarted the Republic's hopes of regaining the territory. Jenatsch, however, thrived in the military life, and rose rapidly through the ranks to major, and later colonel of his own regiment.

Jenatsch killed his colonel, Giacomo Ruinelli, in a duel in 1626 in Chur, but was cleared of murder charges by a city court. He turned to military recruiting, and as Spanish and Austrian influence grew in the Grisons, eventually raised a company for service with the Venetians (1629-1630). He was briefly imprisoned in Venice after an incident of insubordination, and later claimed that reading the Church Fathers while jailed had contributed to his later religious conversion. In 1631 he was recruited for the French campaign designed by Richelieu to drive the Spaniards out of the Valtellina, which after several years of delay, led to the successful campaign of Henri, duc de Rohan (1635). But Jenatsch, along with the military and political leadership of the Republic, soon saw that the French were as unwilling as the Spaniards to restore the Grisons' lordship over the Valtellina.

== Conversion to Catholicism ==
In 1635, Jenatsch made public his conversion to Roman Catholicism (though his family declined to follow suit), and gave covert support to a secret alliance, the Kettenbund, of thirty-one Grisons officers and statesmen — including both Catholic and Protestant leaders — that negotiated secretly with the Spaniards and Austrians. Although officially still in the service of Duke Henri de Rohan, Jenatsch commanded the 3,000-man force that the Kettenbund launched against Rohan's position near Landquart in March 1637, resulting in the expulsion of Rohan and the French from the Grisons.

During the next two years, Jenatsch pushed forward the negotiations with Spain and Austria for the return of the Valtellina under Grisons sovereignty, as well as seeking a noble title for himself. He also became one of the most powerful men in the region, taking the pivotal governorship of Chiavenna for himself, and mixing in the tangled affairs of the Planta clan.

== Death ==
On 24 January 1639 Jenatsch was assassinated in Chur by a band of men whose leader was costumed as a bear, as it was Carnival. Although the murderers remained anonymous and were never captured or tried, the most likely culprit was Rudolf von Planta, son of the murdered Pompeius, or men in his employ. Later historians have proposed many other suspects, and novels and plays about Jenatsch have searched even further afield. Later in 1639, the much coveted Valtellina was restored by Spain to the Grisons, which held it until 1797. Jenatsch's career is of general historical importance as one aspect of the long conflict between France and Spain for control over the Valtellina, which forms one of the most tumultuous episodes in the Thirty Years' War.

== Jenatsch in literature ==
Although interest in Jenatsch waned rapidly after his burial in the Chur cathedral, still wearing the bloodied clothes he had been murdered in, later historians and literary figures took up his story again. In the nineteenth century, he became the subject of numerous plays and biographical studies, which tended to emphasize his fiery character as well as his allegedly deep attachment to his fatherland. One work to discuss him was the novel Jürg Jenatsch by Conrad Ferdinand Meyer (1876), which among other accomplishments changed his name, at least in popular perception, from Giorgio, Georg or Zoartz (the most common forms during his lifetime in Italian, German and Romansh, respectively) to the more north German 'Jürg.' A key feature of Meyer's novel, picked up by later literary versions, was that his murderer was 'Lucrecia' von Planta, daughter of Pompeius and Jenatsch's lover. In Meyer's adaptation of the story, Lucrecia kills Jenatsch, using the same axe he had used on her father, when his self-love and ambition overpower his desire to serve his fatherland. In fact, Meyer changed Jenatsch's birthdate in the novel to make such a relationship possible; earlier authors had already renamed the real Katherina von Planta as 'Lucrecia', a name for which there is no historical foundation. The story about the same axe, however, is found in chronicles written within weeks of Jenatsch's death in 1639.

Since Meyer's novel, several other novels as well as a film (Jenatsch, 1987) have treated his story; and he appears in the 1632 series alternate history novel 1635: The Papal Stakes. In addition, there are two major biographies, one by Ernst Haffter (Davos, 1894), and one by Alexander Pfister, (1936, now in its fifth edition). On the significance of the Valtelline, see the article by Horatio Brown, "The Valtelline", in the Cambridge Modern History, Vol. 4 (1906), and Geoffrey Parker, The Army of Flanders and the Spanish Road, 1567–1659, (1972, 2nd edn. 2004). The newest investigation of Jenatsch the historical figure is Randolph C. Head's Jenatsch's Axe: Social Boundaries, Identity and Myth in the Era of the Thirty Years' War (University of Rochester Press, 2008); Head is a significant scholar of early modern Swiss history writing in English.

In 2012, Jenatsch's body was exhumed from Chur cathedral by a team seeking DNA to confirm that the body was, in fact, Jenatsch.
