= Frischenberg Castle =

- Sennwald

Site information
- Type: hill castle
- Code: CH-SG
- Condition: ruin

Location
- Coordinates: 47°13′54″N 9°26′57″E
- Height: 585 m above the sea

Site history
- Built: after 1313

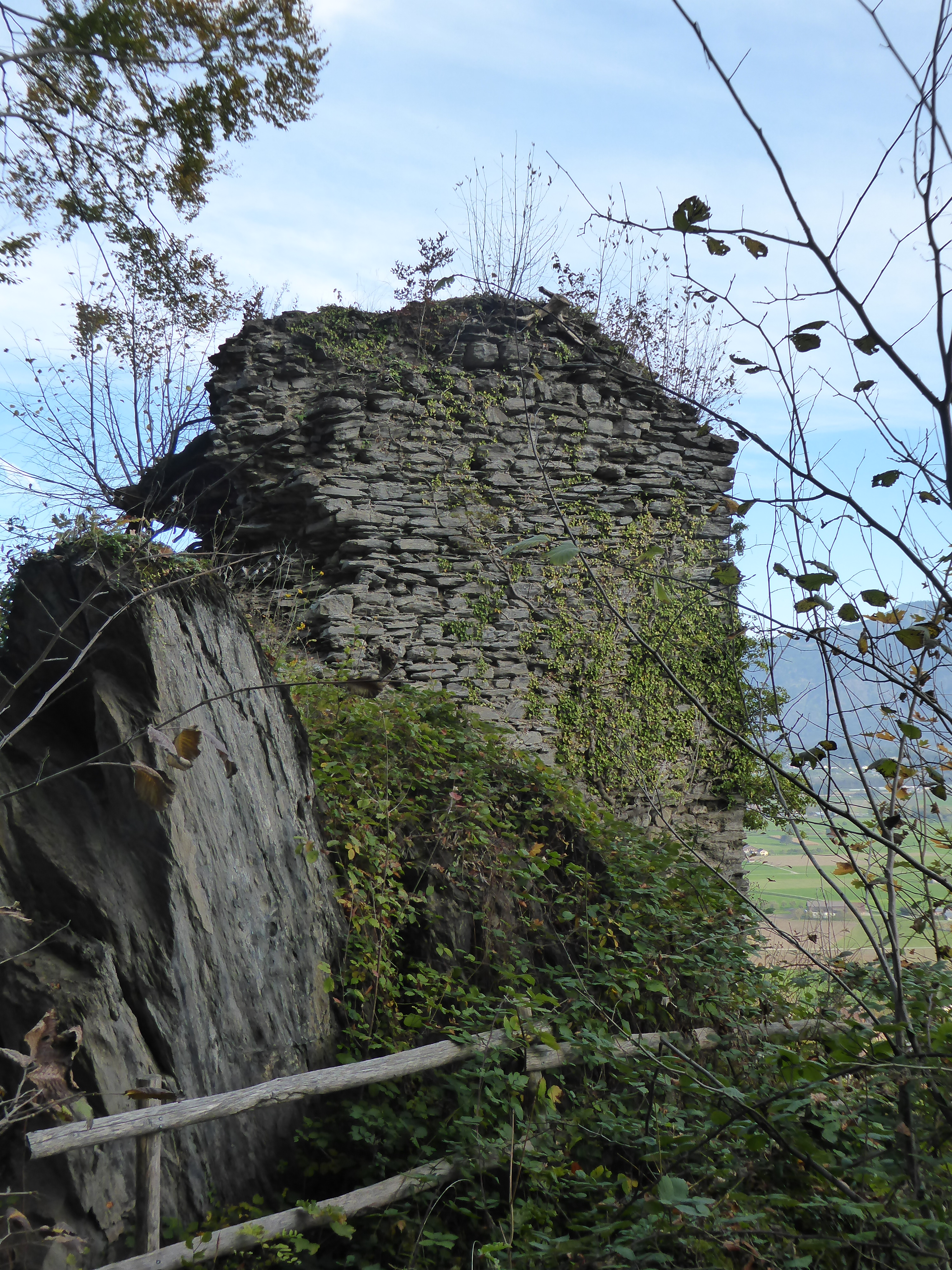
Frischenberg Ruins

Frischenberg is a ruined castle in Sennwald, canton of St. Gallen, Switzerland. It was built in the early 14th century by the lords of Hohensax, probably by Ulrich III von Hohensax some time after 1313. It was destroyed and rebuilt in 1446, and abandoned in 1551.

It is located on a rocky ridge at 585 m (1,919 ft) elevation, overlooking the Alpine Rhine Valley. The ruins of the older Hohensax Castle is nearby on the same ridge, at a distance of about 400 m (1,300 ft)

The castle was sold to duke Leopold IV of Austria in 1393 along with the Hohensax lordship, but returned to Ulrich Eberhard IV of Hohensax as a fief. In the Appenzell War of 1405, the castle was occupied by Appenzell and became detached from the lordship of Hohensax. It was bought by Ulrich von Hohensax in 1440, but in 1446, the castle was again attacked by Appenzell, in the context of the Old Zürich War, and was destroyed. Frischenberg was bought to Albrecht V of Hohensax in 1454. After the St. Gallerkrieg of 1489/90 it passed to the Swiss Confederacy, who gave it to Ulrich IX of Hohensax. Ulrich incorporated the lordship of Frischenberg into Sax-Forstegg in 1517. The castle was abandoned by Ulrich Philipp von Hohensax, who built his new residence in Sax (now part of Sennwald municipality).

== See also ==
- House of Sax
- List of castles in Switzerland
