= Hohensax Castle =

Castle in St. Gallen, Switzerland

- Burg Sax or Hohensax
- Sennwald
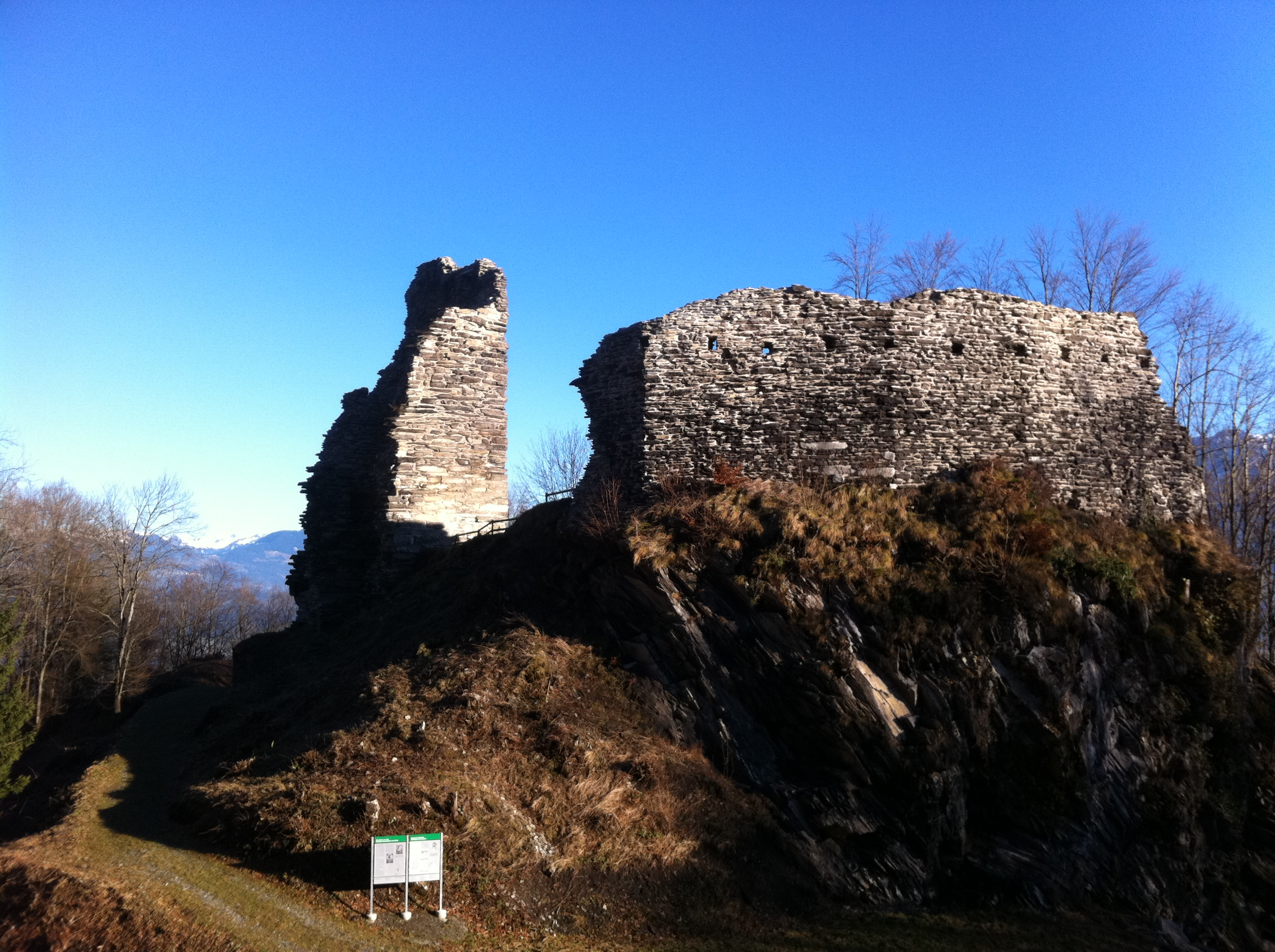
- The ruins of Hohensax Castle

Site information
- Type: hill castle
- Code: CH-SG
- Condition: ruin

Location
- Location within Switzerland
- Coordinates: 47°13′49″N 9°26′37″E
- Height: 750 m above the sea

Site history
- Built: 1200

Hohensax (German: Ruine Hohensax or German: Burg Hohensax) is a ruined castle in the Sennwald municipality in the Swiss canton St. Gallen. The castle was built around 1200 by the barons of Sax, and was destroyed in 1446. In 1248, the castle passed to Ulrich von Sax, founder of the Sax-Hohensax line of the noble family. The castle was plundered in a feud of 1393, and sold together with the villages of Sax and Gams to the dukes of Austria. In the Old Zürich War, the people of Appenzell captured and slighted the castle in 1446. After this, the barons of Hohensax resided in the nearby Forstegg castle at Salez. In 1640, the ruin passed to the barony of Sax-Forstegg, one of the constituent parts of the canton of Linth of the Helvetic Republic in 1798, and later the canton of St. Gallen. It included the villages of Sax, Salez and Gams.

== Gallery ==
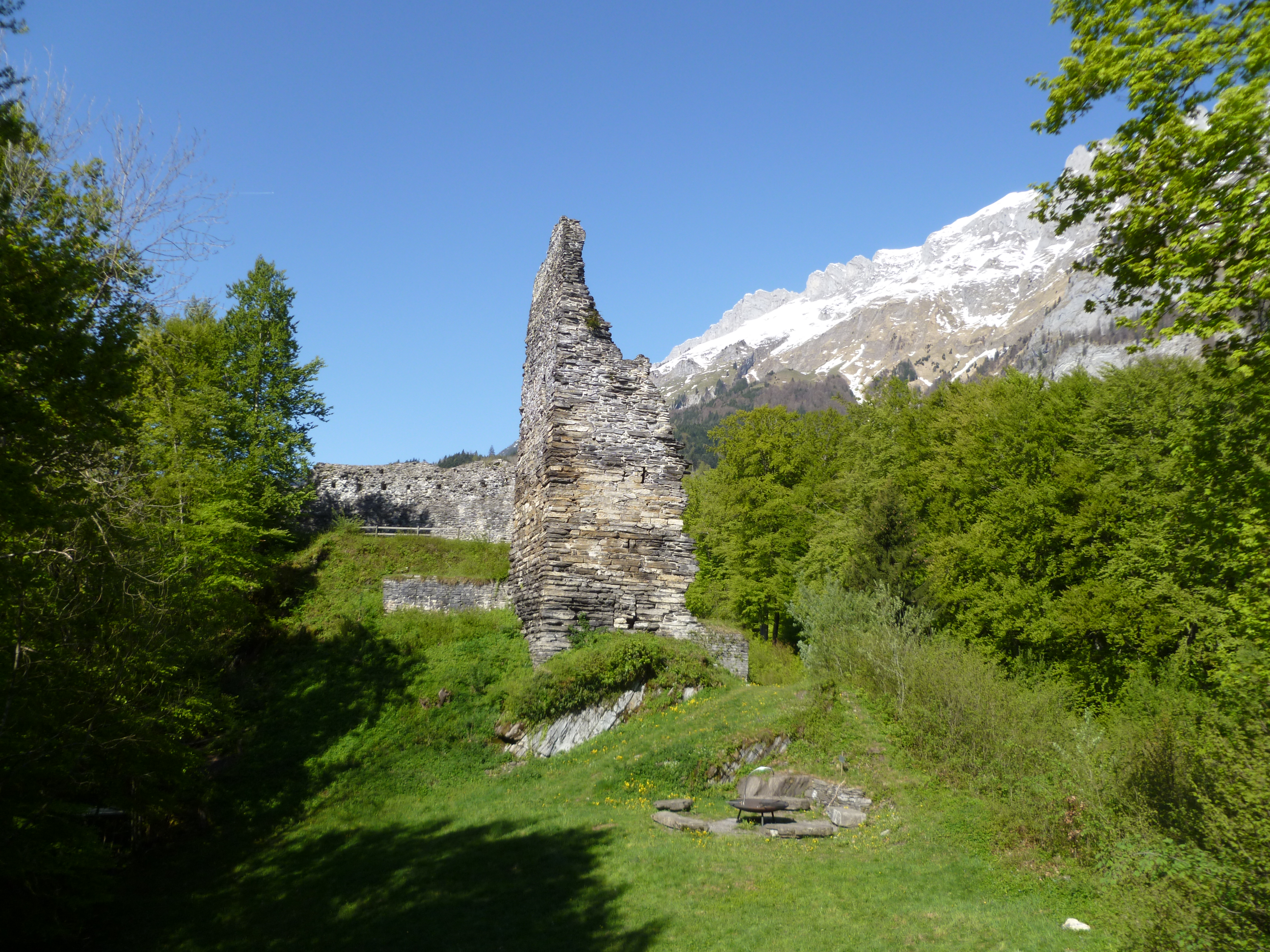
View of the castle from below the tower

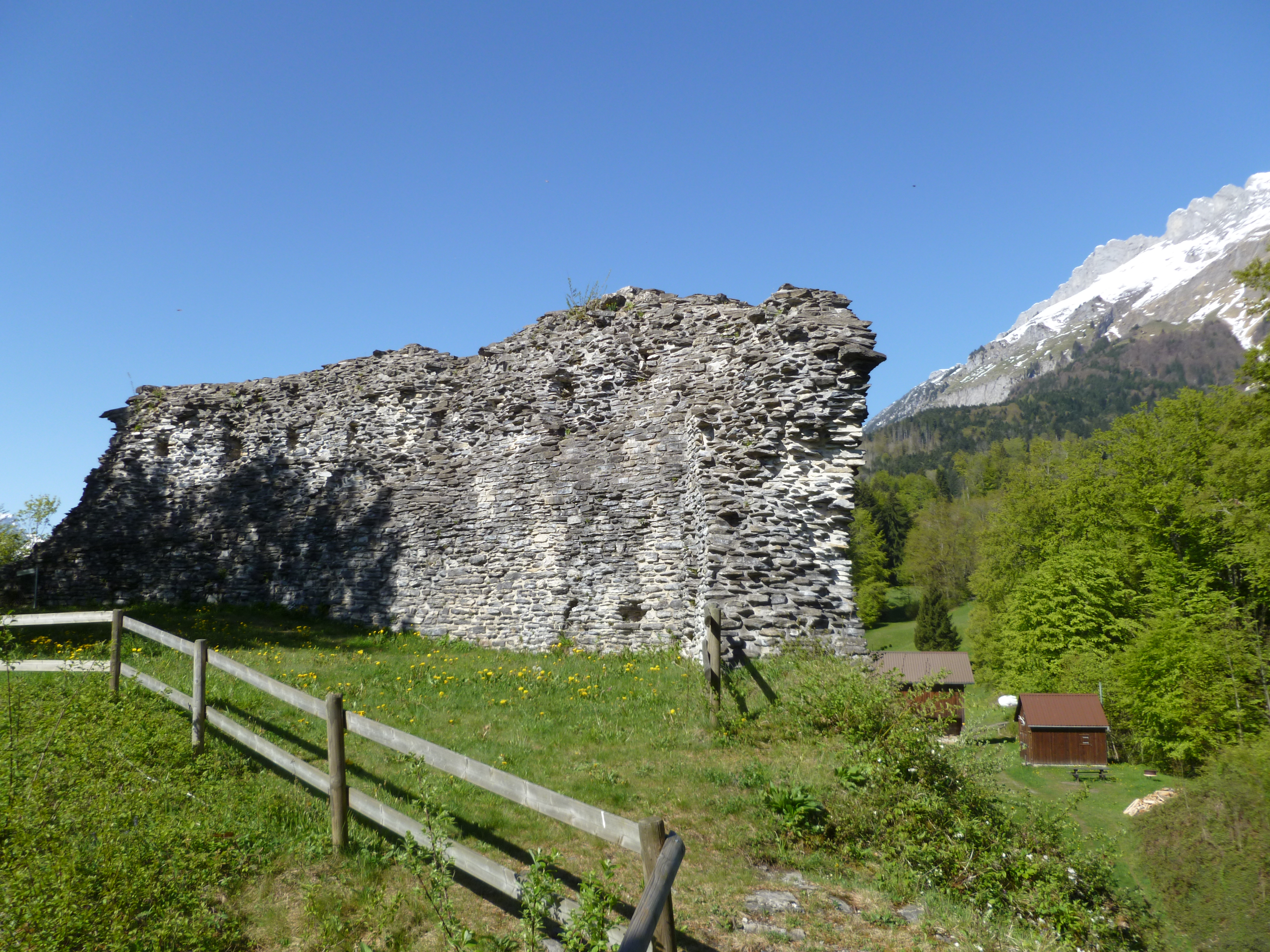
Castle walls

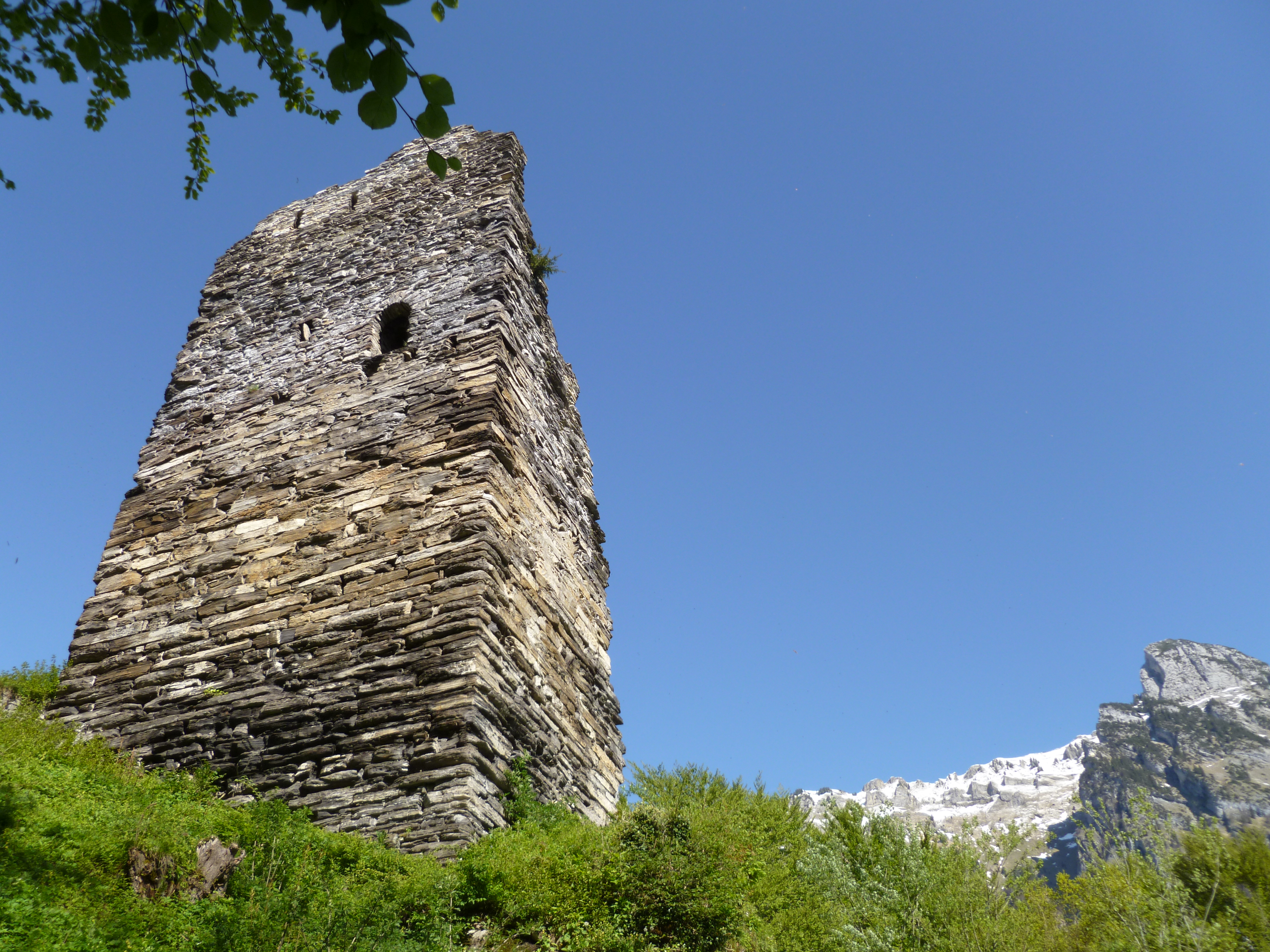
Castle tower

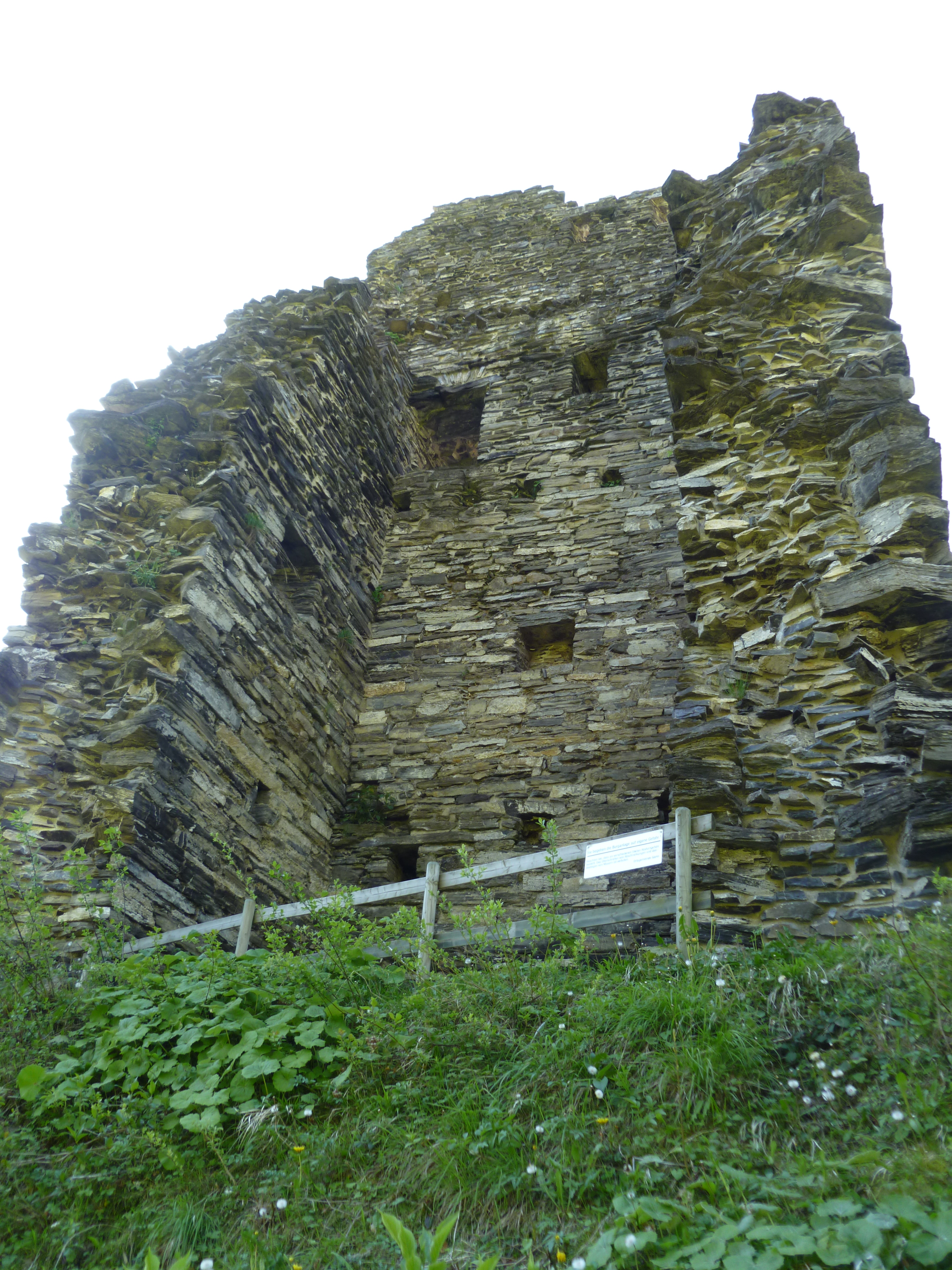
Interior of the castle tower

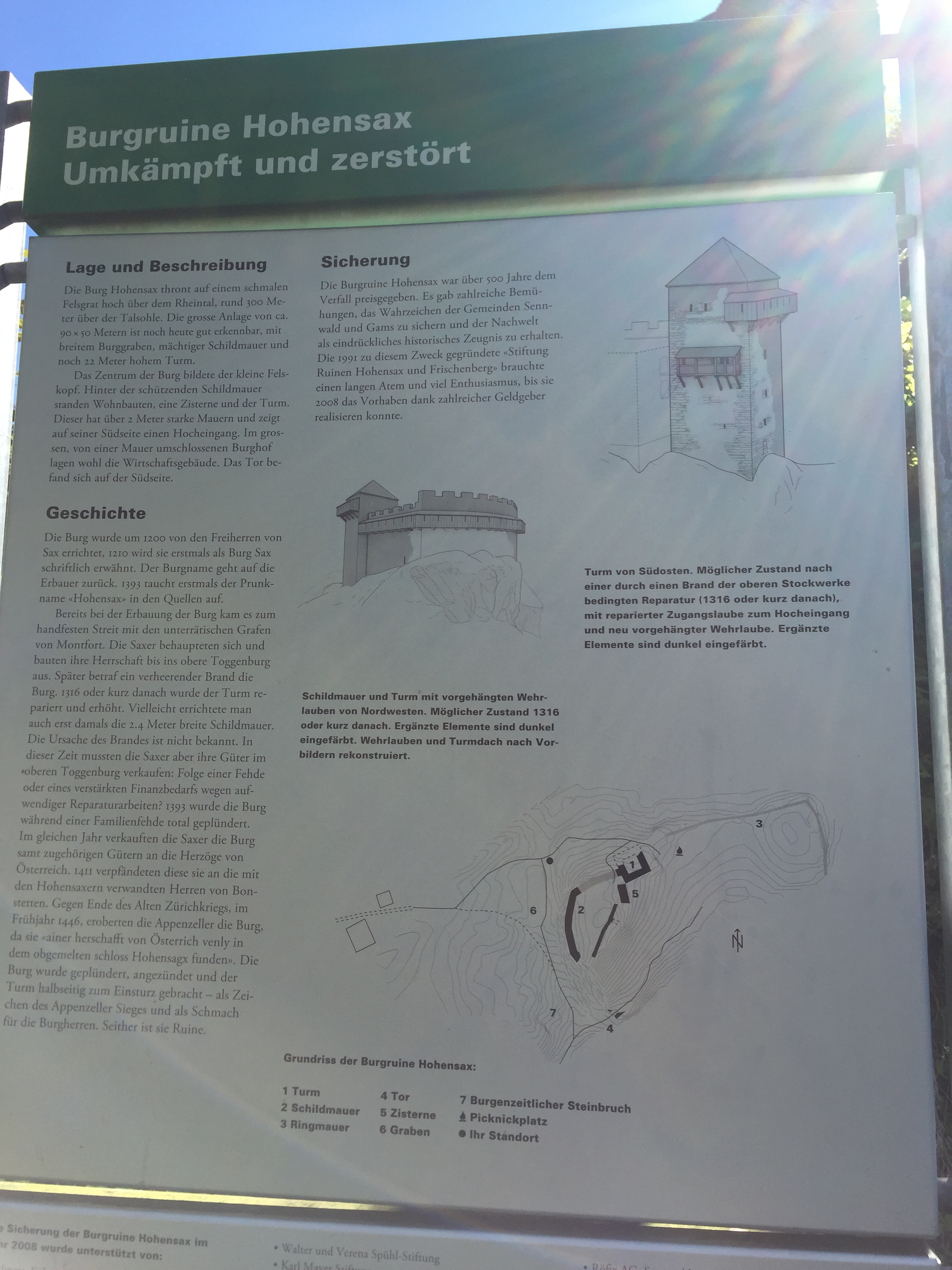
Information board

== See also ==
- List of castles in Switzerland
