= Forstegg Castle =

Ruined castle in Switzerland

- Burg Forstegg
- Sennwald
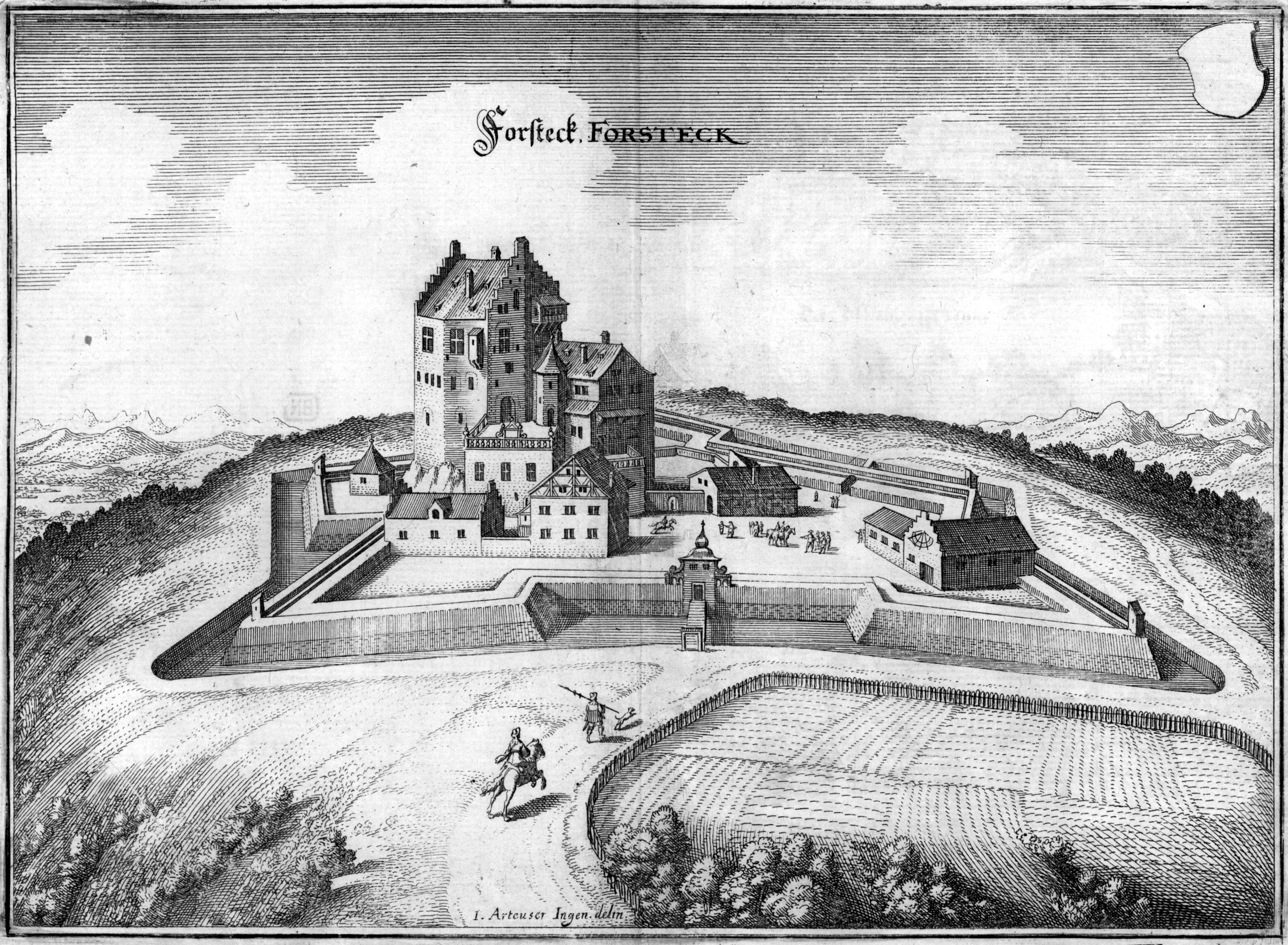
- Forstegg Castle in 1630

Site information
- Type: hill castle
- Code: CH-SG
- Condition: ruin

Location
- Coordinates: 47°14′44″N 9°29′45″E
- Height: 460 m above the sea

Site history
- Built: about 1200

Garrison information
- Occupants: Freiherr of Sax/Misox

Forstegg Castle is a ruined castle in the municipality of Sennwald of the Canton of St Gallen in Switzerland. It was built around 1200 by the Barons of Sax/Misox, was abandoned in the 19th century and fell into ruin in 1894.

== See also ==
- List of castles in Switzerland
