= Sax-Forstegg =

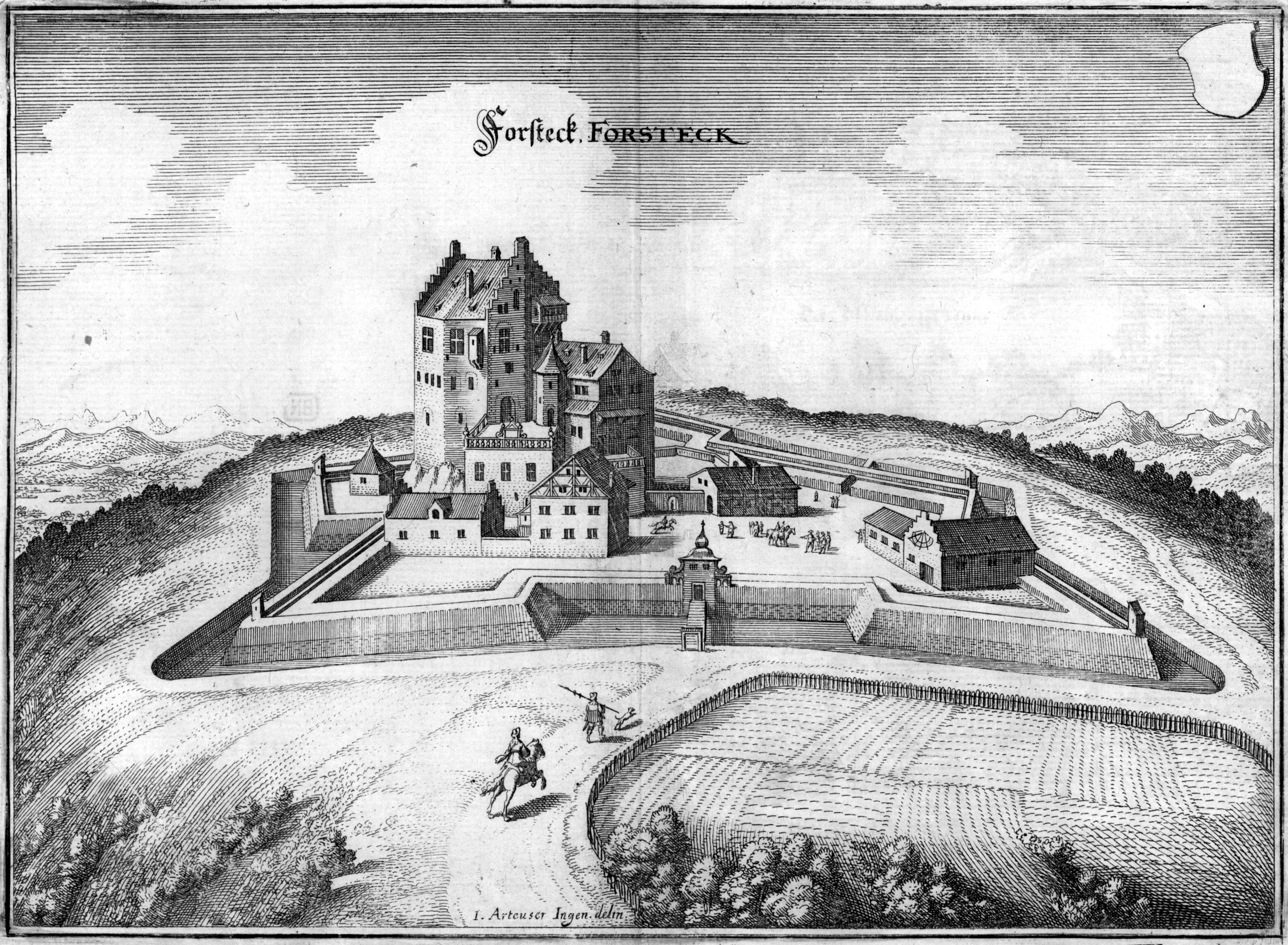
Forstegg castle (Forsteck), engraved by Johann Ardüser, 1654

The Lordship of Sax-Forstegg was a territory in the Alpine Rhine Valley, including the settlements of Sennwald and Altstätten, now part of the canton of St. Gallen, Switzerland. It was named for the baronial family of Sax and their castle Forstegg. It was created with the division of the old Lordship of Sax into Hohensax and Frischenberg in the late 14th century. In 1458, the lords of Sax-Forstegg entered a pact with the Swiss Confederacy. In addition, they were also citizens of St. Gallen from 1463, and citizens of Zürich from 1486.

Baron Ulrich VII von Sax received the villages of Frischenberg and Lienz as a gift from the Confederacy in 1490. He was a successful military commander on the side of the Confederacy in the Swabian War of 1499. The Swiss Reformation was introduced in Sax-Forstegg in 1553. The territory was acquired by Zürich in 1615. Sax-Forsteg remained a bailiwick of Zürich until the collapse of the Old Swiss Confederacy in 1798. It was attached to the canton of Linth in 1798 and became part of the canton of St. Gallen in 1803, from 1831 within Werdenberg District.
