= Belmont Castle, Graubünden =

Ruined castle near Flims, Graubünden, Switzerland

Belmont Castle
- Burg Belmont
- Flims
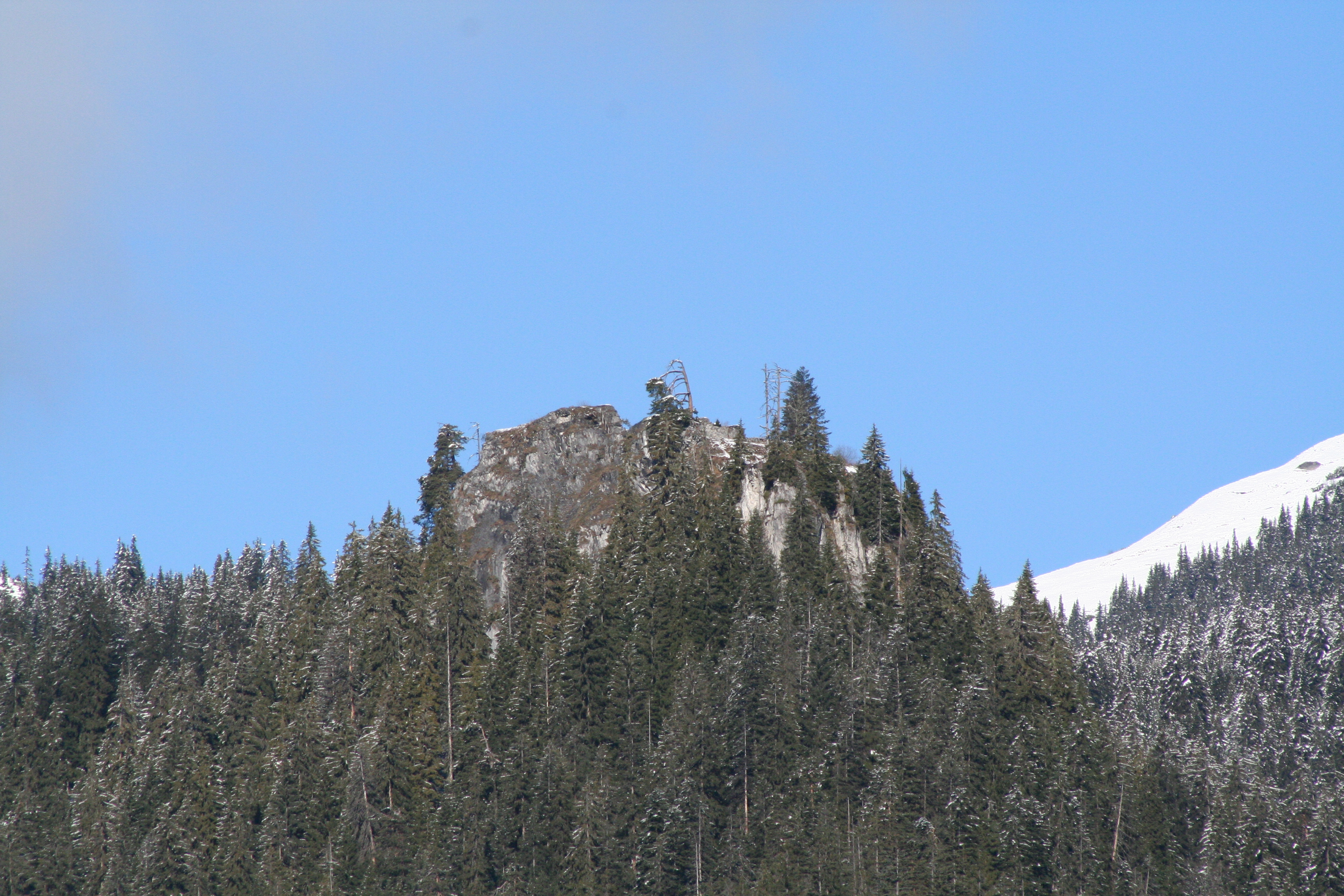
- Ruins of Burg Belmont on its hill

Site information
- Type: Hill castle
- Code: CH-GR
- Condition: ruin

Location
- Coordinates: 46°50′44″N 9°20′3″E
- Height: 1,420 m above the sea

Site history
- Built: about 1000

Garrison information
- Occupants: free nobility

Belmont Castle (German: Burg Belmont) is a ruined castle near Flims, Graubünden, Switzerland. It was the home of the Barons of Belmont.

== History ==
Belmont Castle was built in the 10th or 11th century for the Freiherr von Belmont. The first recorded member of the family was Lutefridus de Belmonte in 1137/39. The Belmont family was related to a number of other Raetian noble families including the powerful von Vaz. By the 13th century they were one of the most powerful families in Graubünden. They owned castles and villages throughout the region. Konrad von Belmont was the Bishop of Chur from 1273 until 1282. In 1267 Heinrich von Belmont was the first student from Raetia to study at University of Bologna. By 1200 the Belmonts appear to have moved to another castle near Castrisch and then to Tuma Casti by Domat/Ems, probably leaving a bailiff or vogt at Belmont.

In 1352 Ulrich Walter von Belmont led a successful uprising against the Counts of Werdenberg-Heiligenberg. Together with the armies of the Montalt and the Rhäzüns families they defeated a Werdenberg-Heiligenberg army at Mundaun near Ilanz. In retaliation, soon thereafter, a Werdenberg army burned Ilanz to the ground. It is unknown whether Belmont Castle was also attacked and destroyed or was bypassed, but by the late 14th century it had fallen into ruins. On 11 July 1371 Ulrich Walter von Belmont died childless and the Belmont lands were inherited by the Montalt and Sax-Misox families. In 1380 the Sax-Misox family traded the ruins of Belmont Castle as well as other lands to Brun von Rhäzüns. After the trade the castle remained abandoned and continued to disintegrate.

From 1932 through 1936 the ruins were excavated and repaired.

== Castle site ==
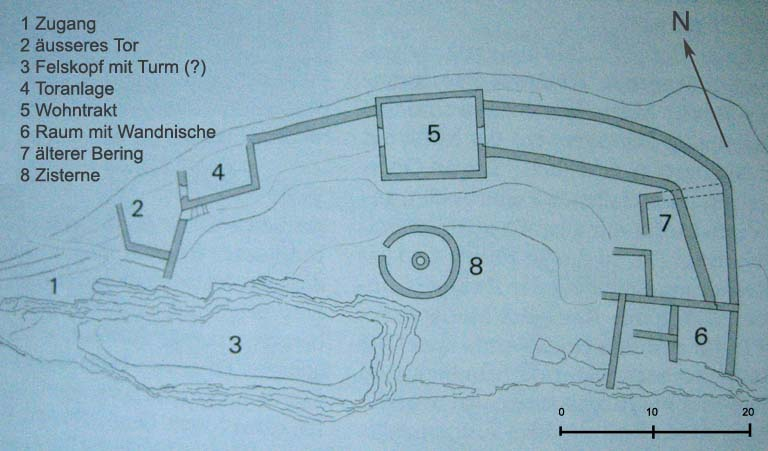
Floor plan of Belmont Castle

The castle was built near the, now abandoned and vanished, Walser village of Fidaz near Flims. It was built on a rocky spire with sheer cliffs on the north and east sides. Very little is known about the construction history and layout of the castle. However, there were two semi-circular ring wall that wrapped around the east, north and north-west sides of the peak with the inner one built first followed by the outer later. The walls connected at least three buildings. The central and eastern building were probably residences. In the center of the half-circle is a 5.7 meters (19 ft) deep cistern. On the southern side of the castle is a smaller rocky peak that stands about 8 m (26 ft) above the castle and has a flat top that is about 10 m × 30 m (33 ft × 98 ft). No stone ruins have been found on the small peak, so it was probably topped with one or more wooden buildings.

A stone wall which was probably part of the outer fortifications is still visible at the foot of the spire.

== Gallery ==
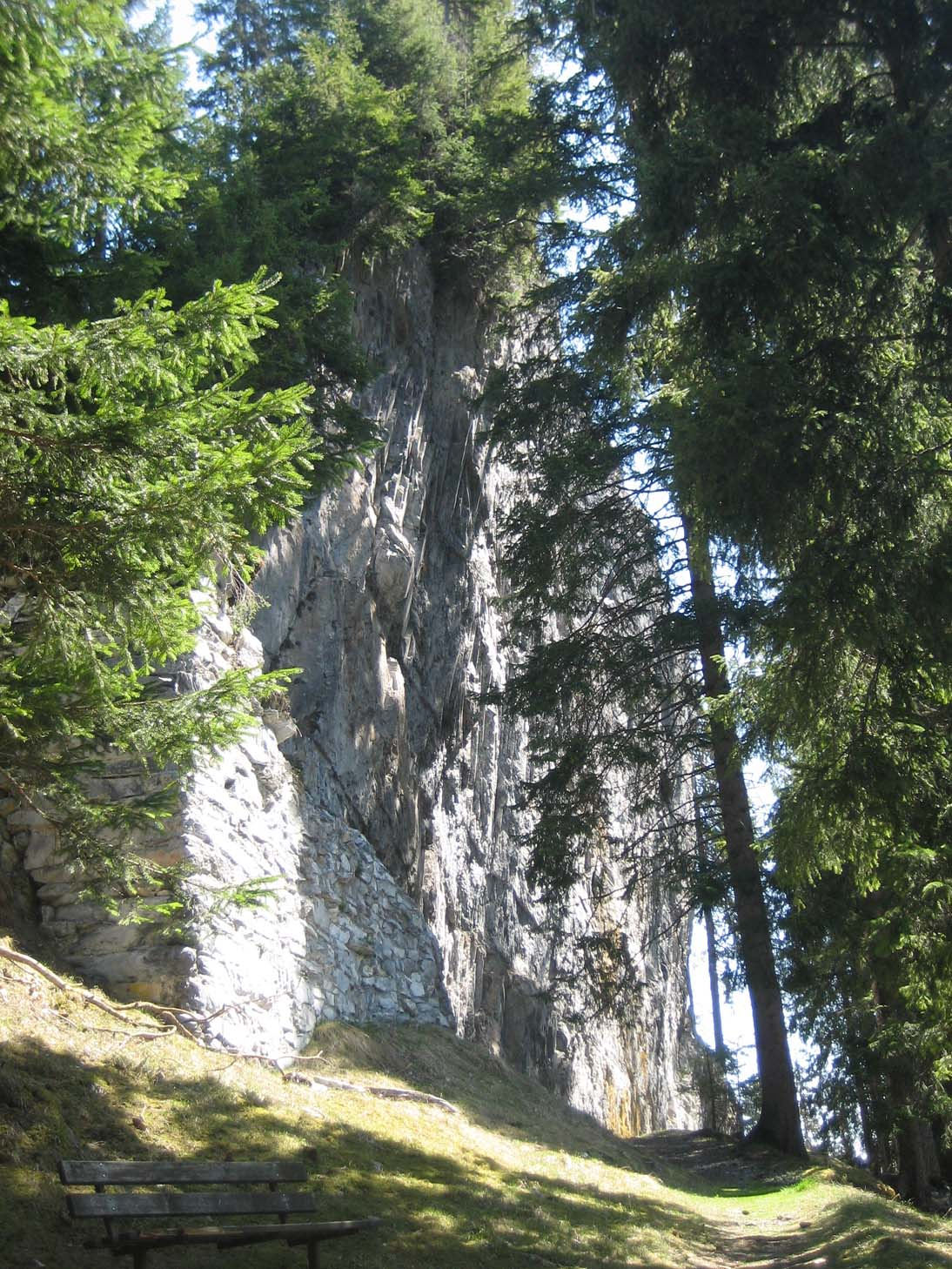
Stone wall below Belmont Castle

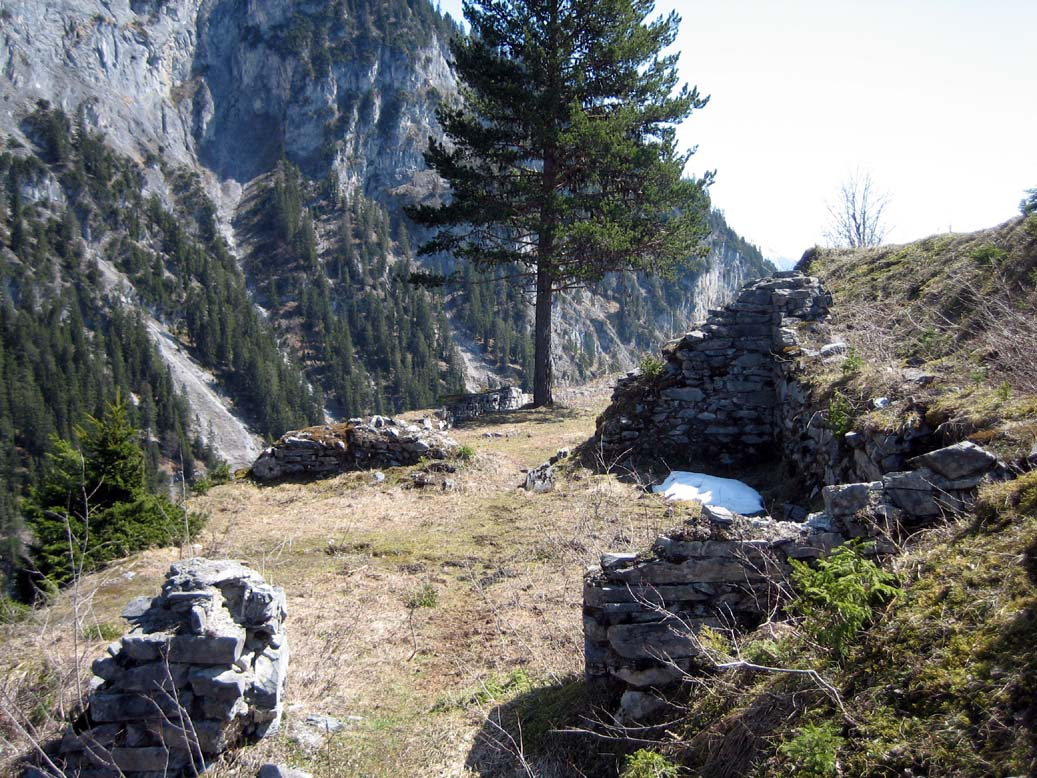
Residential building

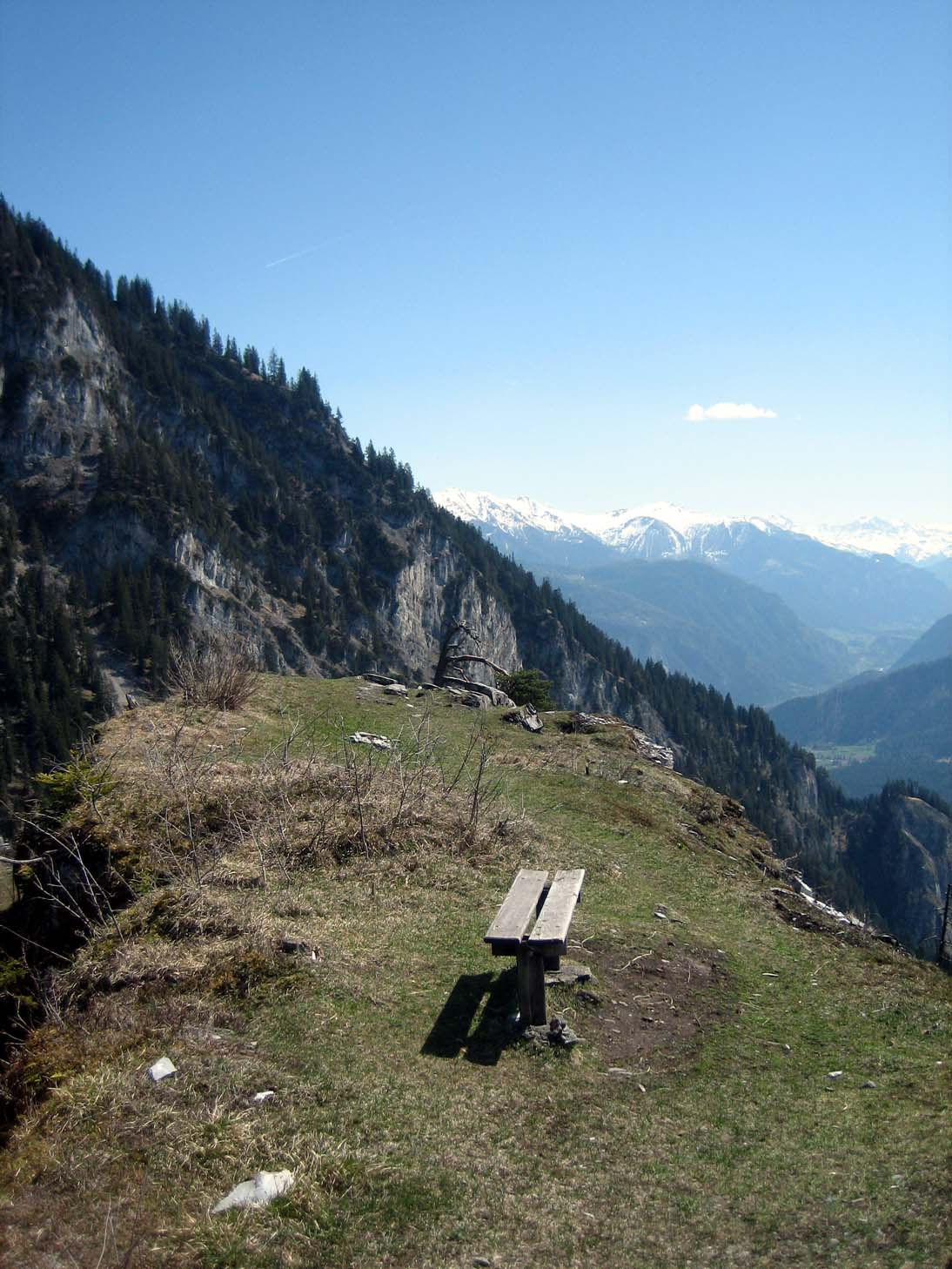
Upper peak

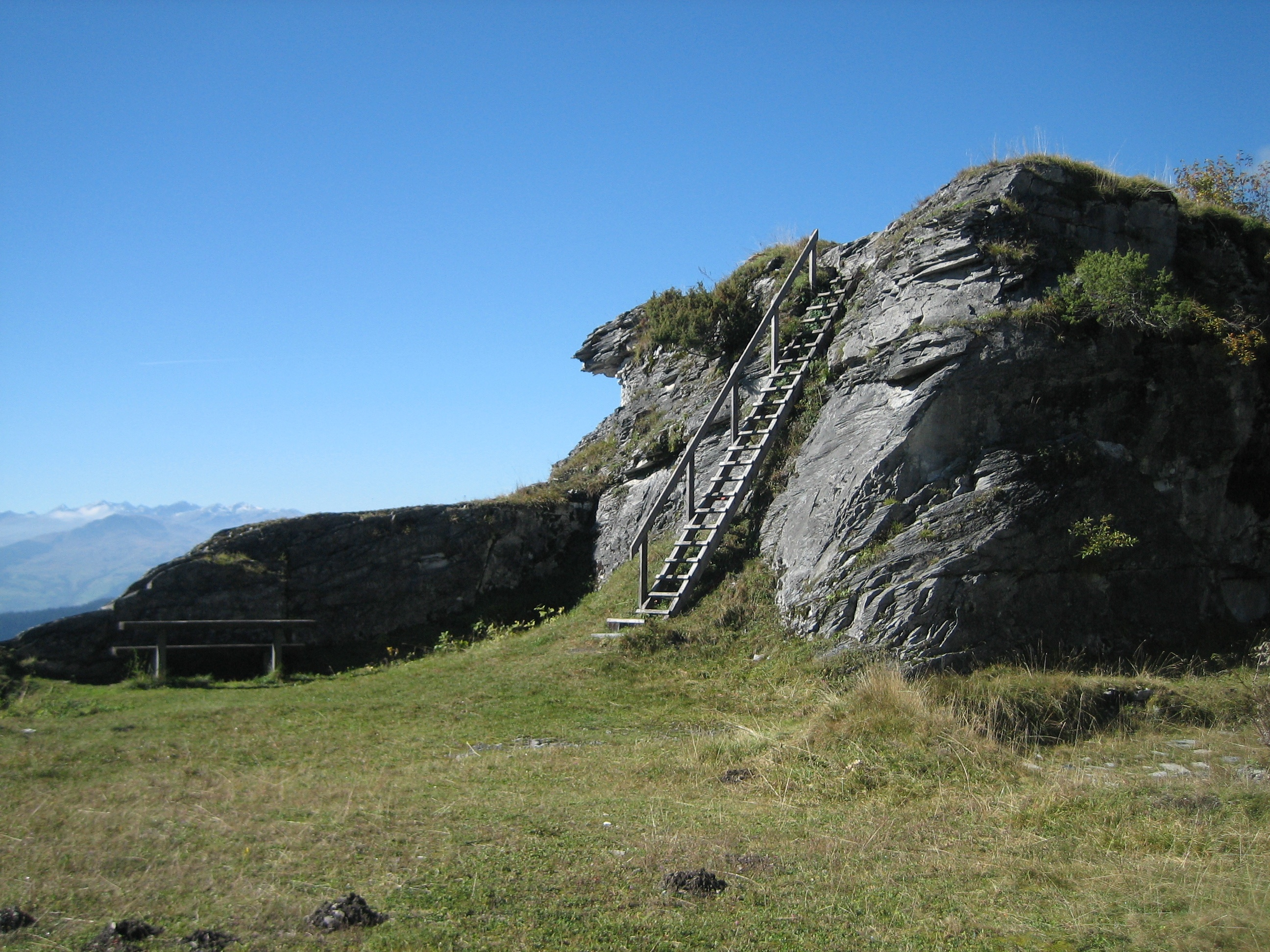
Ladder to the upper peak

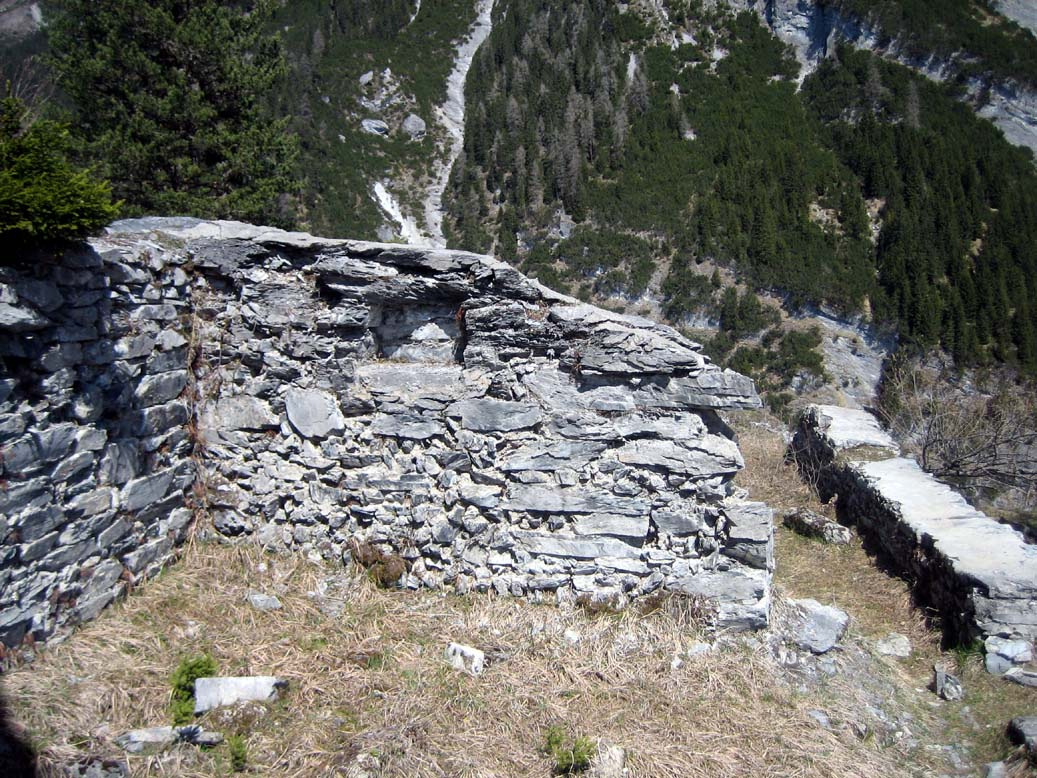
Small niche in a wall in the residential building

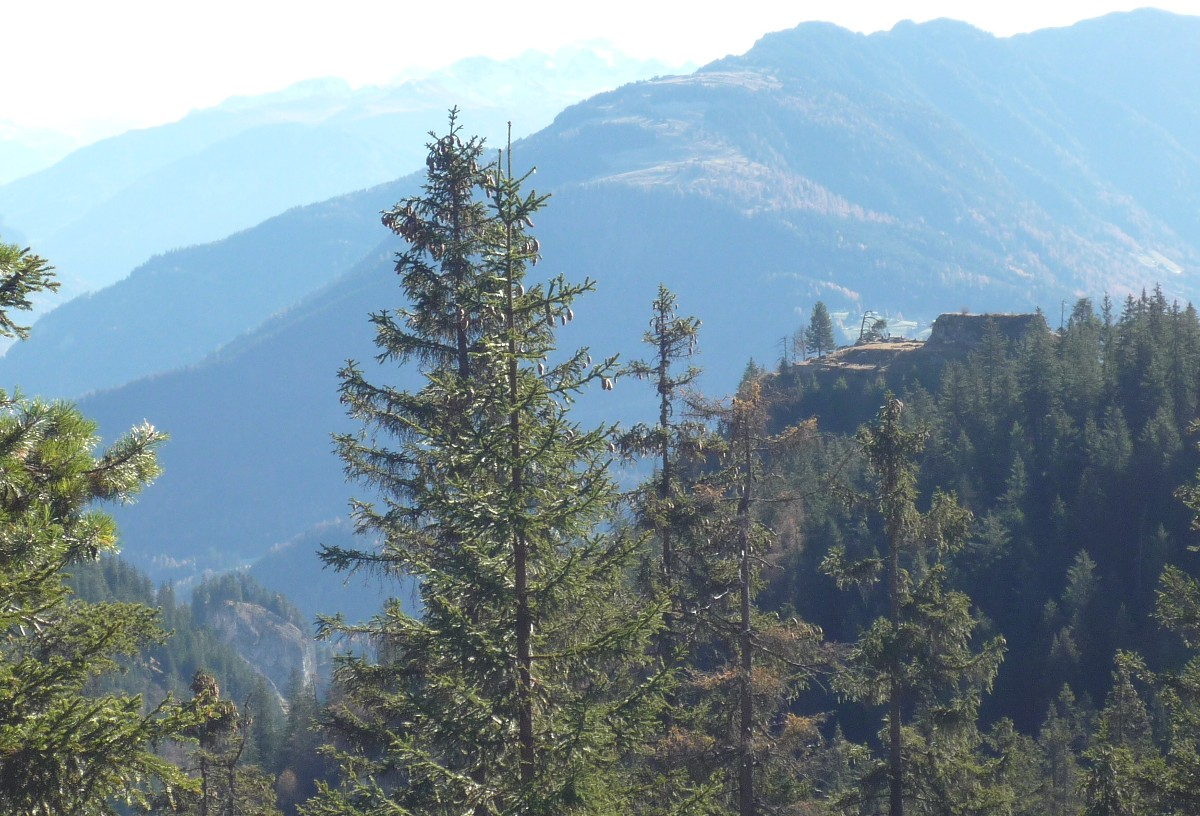
View of the Belmont Castle site

== See also ==
- List of castles in Switzerland
