= Swiss Associates =

Type of diplomatic relationship in the Old Swiss Confederacy

Swiss Associates Zugewandte Orte (German) Pays alliés (French) Paesi alleati (Italian)
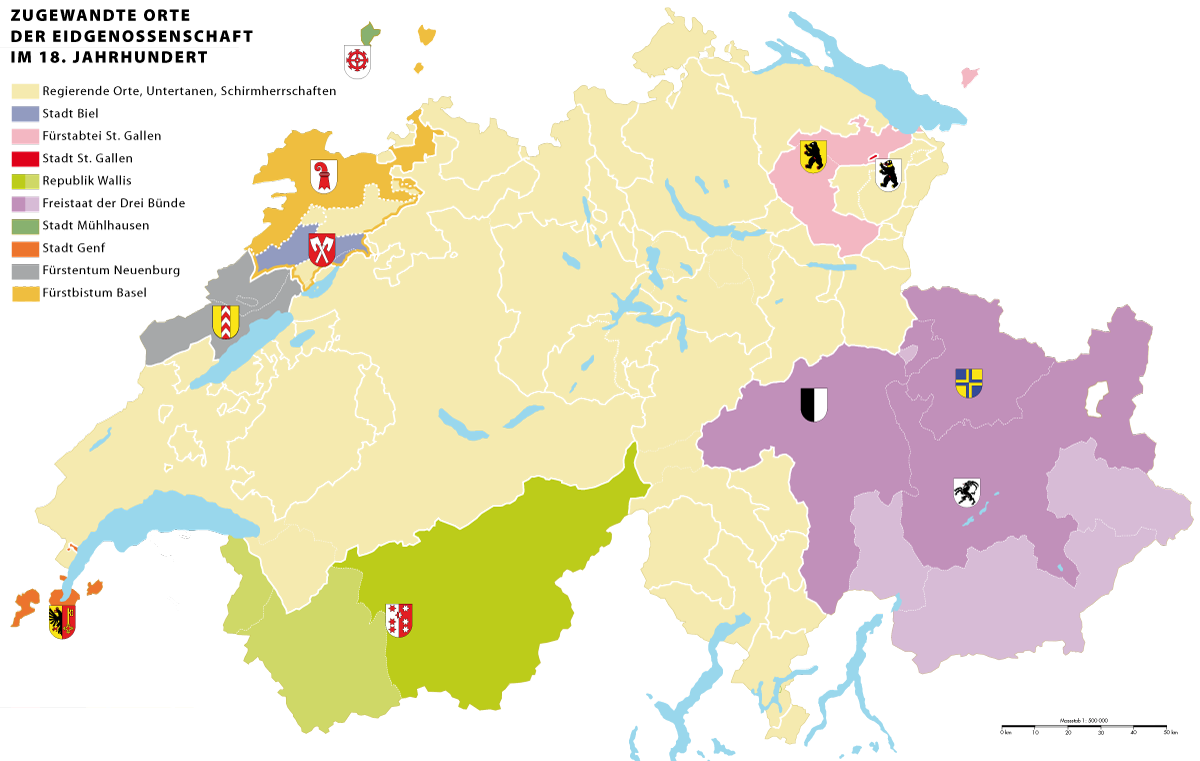
- Map showing the Swiss Associates
- Status: Associated States of the Old Swiss Confederacy
- Common languages: Middle French / French / Alemannic German / Lombard / Rhaeto-Romansh
- Religion: Catholic / Reformed
- Government: Associated States; Tagsatzung

Swiss Associates, also known as Associated Places, Zugewandte Orte (Facing Places), or Pays Alliés (Allied Countries), were associate states of the Old Swiss Confederacy, with some form of alliance agreement with either the entire Confederation or individual cantons.

The associates were extremely heterogeneous. They had no institution that bound them together, other than their alliances with the Swiss Confederacy. Some had extremely close bonds with the Confederation, whereas others were only bound with one or two cantons. Generally, all nations that were related to the Confederation that were not subjects nor fully fledged cantons were considered associates.

Whereas members of the Swiss Confederacy were not permitted to form alliances or ties with outside states without consent of all cantons, the associates were permitted to form their own alliances and conduct their own diplomacy. Grisons for example even had their own delegates at the Congress of Vienna. Following the creation of the Federal Diet, associate states were also permitted to send delegates as representatives in the diet. However, not all associate states were not granted the right vote. Over time, many associates were gradually absorbed into the cantons, or became cantons themselves. By 1815, the remaining associates would become part of the modern Swiss Confederacy.

== Etymology ==
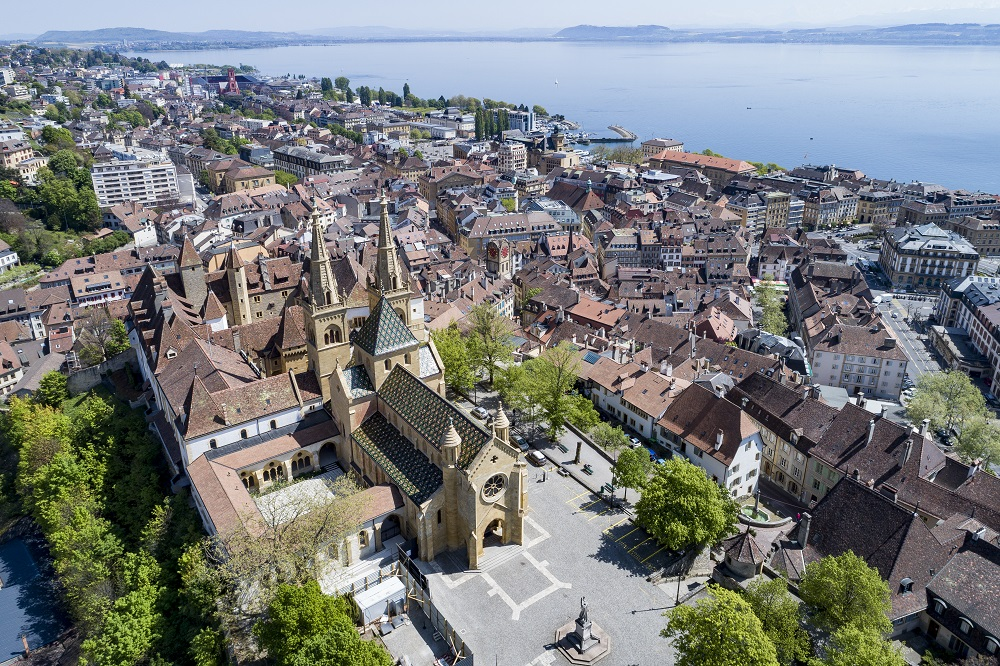
Neuchatel, which was a Swiss Associate, became a canton in 1815

The origin of the German term Zugewandte Orte (literally meaning Facing Places) is unknown, but it was used in 15th century Swiss sources to refer to certain secular and ecclesiastical territories that were subject to contractual agreements with the Confederation without being a full member of the Confederation. Throughout the 16th century, multiple states would be described as being related to the Confederacy, such as the Bishopric of Constance. The French term, Pays Alliés (meaning Allied Countries), is a more modern representation of the term.

== Relationship with the Swiss Confederacy ==
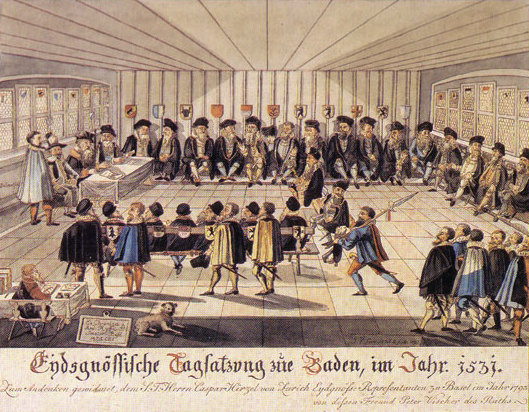
Artwork depicting the Federal Diet, also known as the Tagsatzung

As mentioned before, each associate had different relations with the Confederacy when compared to others. Associates were allied with the confederation in terms of military aid, though on occasion such aid was asymmetrical, as was the norm with European diplomacy at the time due to the complex shifting of alliances. What was always ensured was the enactment of duties, trade, justice, and mediation in terms of conflicts, that latter of which generally enforced by the Federal Diet, in which most associates had representatives in.

The associates themselves also differed in how close their relations were with the Swiss cantons. Some had excellent relations with all or most of the cantons, whereas others hardly had treaties at all.

While Biel was united by a Burgrecht treaty only to Fribourg, Bern and Solothurn, the cities of Rottweil and Mulhouse were allied to all 13 cantons; nevertheless the latter are the only ones who are no longer currently part of the [Confederacy]. The Gray League and the Caddea League were linked to the seven [cantons]... the League of the Ten Jurisdictions only to the [cantons] of Zurich, Bern and Glarus. The bishop of Sion and the Valais were allied... with the cantons.. of central Switzerland and... with Bern. The city of St. Gallen was an [ally] of six cantons, while the abbey principality was an [ally] and protectorate of four cantons; Furthermore, a part of its territory, Toggenburg, was in turn considered an allied country of Schwyz and Glarus on the basis of the… Treaty of 1436, but without the right to vote in the [Federal] Diet.

— Andreas Würgler, Zugewandte Orte.

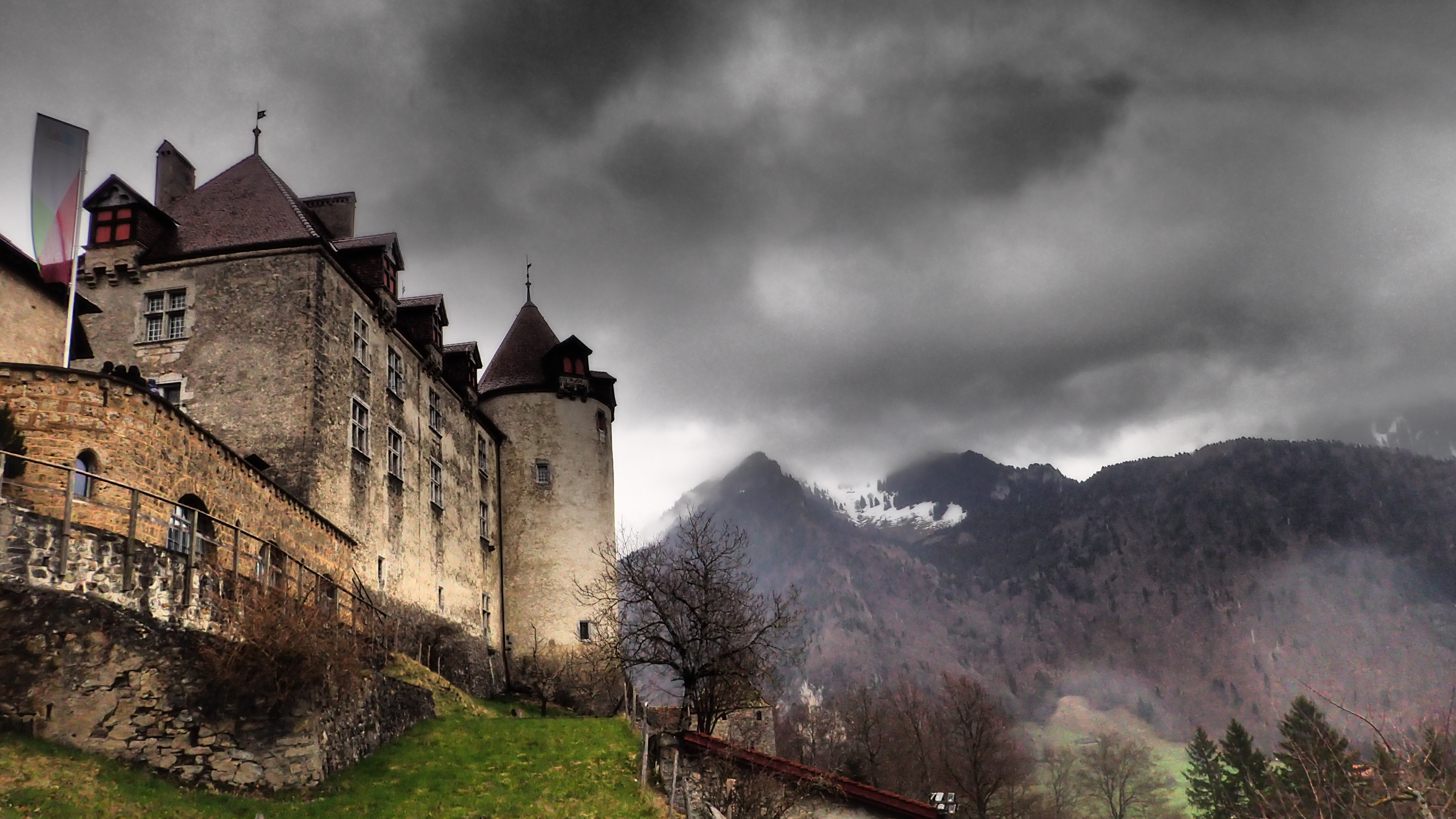
Gruyere Castle

In the later years of the Confederacy, some associates even gained the ability to vote in the Federal Diet, which was not possible in the past. This privilege was only granted to the largest and most influential associates. The associates of St. Gallen and Biel were regular and officially authorized members of the diet from 1667, and Graubünden, Valais, Mulhouse and Rottweil all held sporadic spots in the diet as well. Not all associates had such benefits; The city and county of Neuchâtel, the city of Geneva and the Prince-Bishop of Basel, all did not have any representation in the diet.

Some associates even had their territory directly integrated into the Confederacy. The County of Gruyere, originally an associate, fell bankrupt in 1555, and was partitioned by the cantons of Fribourg and Bern. The Lordship of Sax-Forstegg, which held an associate status due to a 1458 treaty with Zurich, would be annexed by Zurich in 1615. These annexations were not rare, and were important in the centralization of Switzerland. In the 14th and 15th century, Switzerland was littered with Imperial Villages. These were some of the smallest entities within the Holy Roman Empire. By 1803, only 5 imperial villages remained, several of which annexed into the Confederation by larger cantons.

Due to the extremely vague and undefined nature of the Swiss Associates, they were unique when it came to political affairs. Depending on the situation, the Federal Diet could either emphasize autonomy or subtract autonomy from the associate states. The surrounding areas also acted as a buffer state, defending the core of the Swiss Confederacy from their rivals. The Three Leagues for example provided a good buffer to Habsburg Austria. The Confederation could also use the military potential of the associates without having the bear responsibility for the land, for they weren't fully part of the Confederation.

== List of Swiss Associates ==
=== Close associates ===
These associates were known as Engere Zugewandte:

- Biel – 1344–82 treaties with Fribourg, Bern and Solothurn. Nominally, Biel was subject to the Bishopric of Basel.
- Imperial Abbey of St. Gallen – 1451 treaty with Schwyz, Lucerne, Zürich and Glarus, renewed in 1479 and 1490. The abbey was simultaneously a protectorate.
- Imperial City of St. Gallen – 1454 treaty with Schwyz, Lucerne, Zürich, Glarus, Zug and Bern.

=== Eternal associates ===
This consisted of two Federations, known collectively as Ewige Mitverbündete:

- Sieben Zenden, an independent federation in the Valais – Became a Zugewandter Ort in 1416 through an alliance with Uri, Unterwalden and Lucerne, followed by a treaty with Bern in 1446.
- Three Leagues were independent federations on the territory of the Grisons and became an associates of the Old Swiss Confederacy in 1497/98 through the events of the Swabian War. The Three Leagues together concluded an alliance pact with Bern in 1602.
  - Grey League, who had been allied with Glarus, Uri and Obwalden through pacts from 1400, 1407 and 1419, entered an alliance with seven of the old eight cantons (the Acht Orte without Bern) in 1497
  - League of God's House (Gotteshausbund) followed suit a year later.
  - League of the Ten Jurisdictions, the third of the leagues, entered an alliance with Zürich and Glarus in 1590.

=== Protestant associates ===
There were two associates known as Evangelische Zugewandte:

- Republic of Mulhouse – Concluded a first treaty with some cantons in 1466 and became an associate in 1515 through a treaty with all 13 members of the Confederacy, remaining so until events of the French Revolutionary Wars in 1798.
- Republic of Geneva – 1536 treaty with Bern and a 1584 treaty with Zürich and Bern, remaining so until events of the French Revolutionary Wars in 1798.

=== Other ===
- County of Neuchâtel – 1406 and 1526 treaties with Bern and Solothurn, 1495 treaty with Fribourg and 1501 treaty with Lucerne.
- Imperial Valley of Urseren – 1317 treaty with Uri; annexed by Uri in 1410.
- Weggis – 1332–1380 by treaties with Uri, Schwyz, Unterwalden and Lucerne; annexed by Lucerne in 1480.
- Murten – from 1353 by treaty with Bern; became a confederal condominium in 1475.
- Payerne – from 1353 by treaty with Bern; annexed by Bern in 1536.
- County of Sargans – from 1437 by treaty with Glarus and Schwyz; became a confederal condominium in 1483.
- Barony of Sax-Forstegg – from 1458 by treaty with Zürich; annexed by Zürich in 1615
- Stein am Rhein – from 1459 by treaty with Zürich and Schaffhausen; annexed by Zürich in 1484.
- County of Gruyère – had been allied with Fribourg and Berne since the early 14th century, becoming a full associate of the Confederation in 1548. When the counts fell bankrupt in 1555, the country was partitioned in twain
  - Lower Gruyère – from 1475 by treaty with Fribourg
  - Upper Gruyère – from 1403 by treaty with Berne; annexed by Berne in 1555:
    - Imperial Valley of Saanen
    - Imperial Valley of Château-d'Œx
- County of Werdenberg – from 1493 by treaty with Lucerne; annexed by Glarus in 1517.
- Imperial City of Rottweil – from 1519 to 1632 through a treaty with all 13 members; a first treaty on military cooperation had already been concluded in 1463. In 1632, the treaty was renewed with Lucerne, Uri, Schwyz, Unterwalden, Zug, Solothurn and Fribourg.
- Bishopric of Basel – 1579–1735 by treaty with Lucerne, Uri, Schwyz, Unterwalden, Zug, Solothurn and Fribourg.
