= Mesocco Castle =

Ruined castle in Switzerland

- Castello di Mesocco
- Mesocco
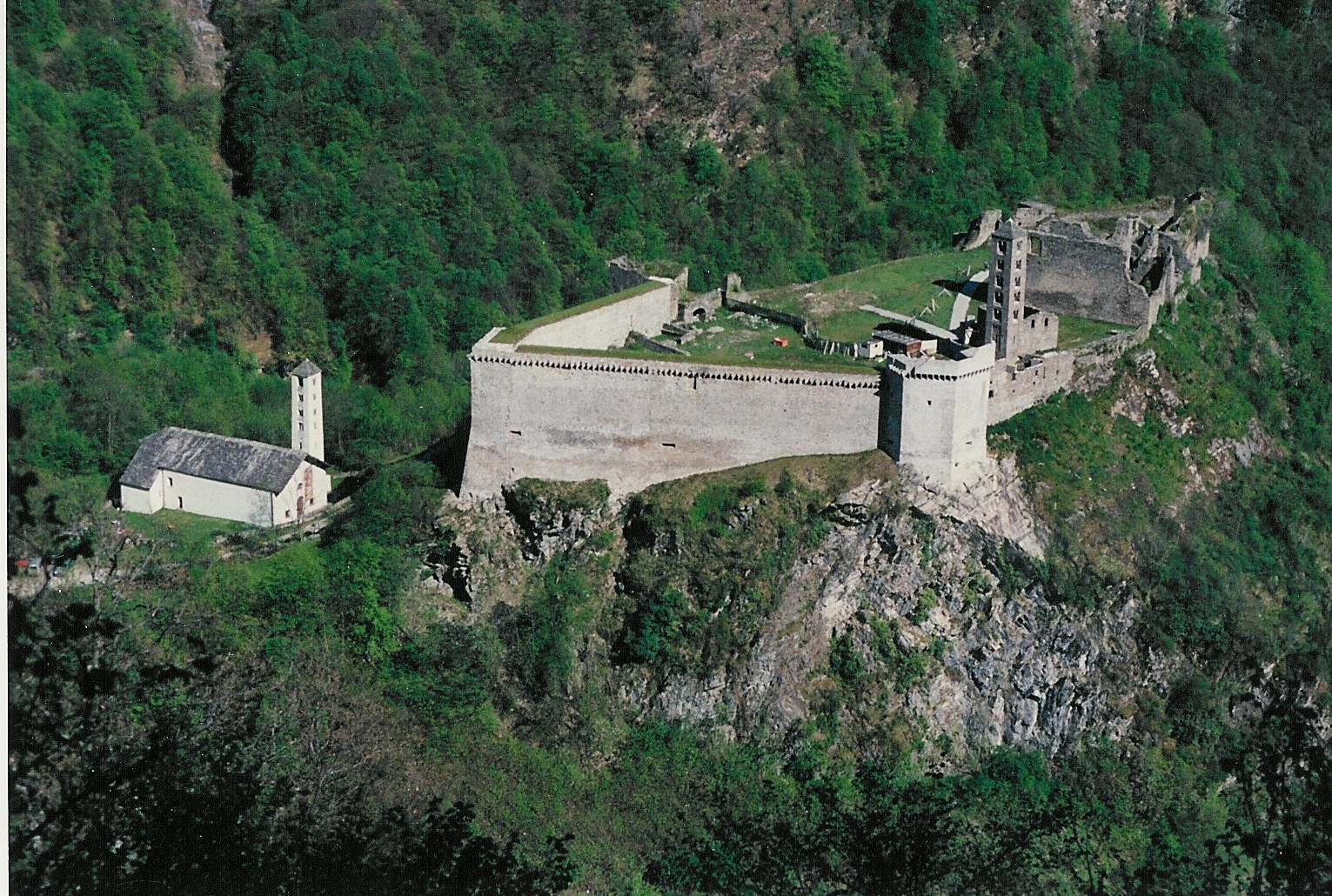
- Mesocco Castle ruins and Church of Sta. Maria del Castello

Site information
- Type: Hill castle
- Code: CH-GR
- Condition: ruin

Location
- Coordinates: 46°22′48″N 9°13′57″E
- Height: 752 m above the sea

Site history
- Built: Before 1219

Mesocco Castle is a ruined castle in the municipality of Mesocco of the Canton of Graubünden in Switzerland. It is a Swiss heritage site of national significance.

The Castello ruins are among the largest in the canton. Originally the seat of the noble family von Sax, from the 12th century until 1480 it was held by the Freiherr of Misox/Mesocco. From 1480 until 1549 it was held by the Trivulzio family.

== History ==
A small fortified church, the Church of S. Carpoforo, was built on the hill top around the 7th century as a refuge castle for the surrounding villages. Around 1000, the fortifications around the church began gradually expanding and a bell tower was added to the church. A bergfried was added between 1150 and 1200, changing the shape and location of the walls. By the 12th century the fortified church and occasionally used fortifications had expanded into a permanently occupied castle with a nobleman who ruled over the nearby valley. By 1219 it was mentioned as Mesocco Castle. In the 13th century the castle was expanded again. A ring wall now encircled the entire hill top and a large residential wing was added to the tower. Around 1400 the residential wing was expanded and now formed an inner castle with the tower.

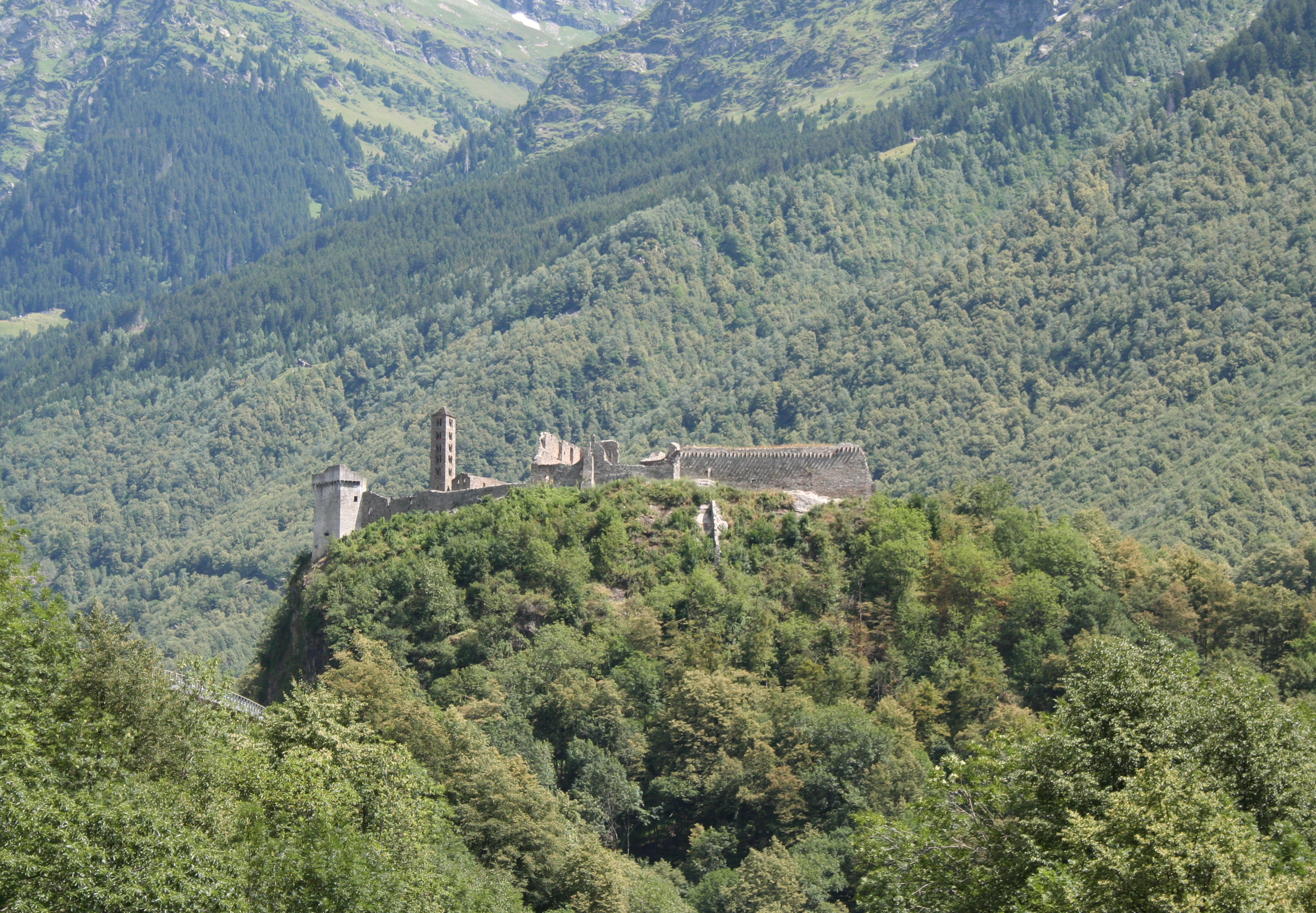
Mesocco Castle from the South

The first ruler of the castle was the local Baron of Sax/Misox, who by the 13th century ruled over the entire Val Mesolcina and controlled a number of castles. By the end of the century, the baron's power crossed over the San Bernardino Pass and by the 14th century they reached the peak of their power. Baron Albert von Sax-Misox was a founding member of the Grey League and the family's future looked bright. However, Albert's murder in 1406 led to the gradual decline of the family. In 1480 they sold Mesocco castle and its associated demesne to General Giacomo Trivulzio.

Trivulzio had been sent by Milan to acquire the castle and strengthen their claims in the strategic valley. After he paid a deposit on the castle and occupied it, he refused the pay the remainder of the agreed upon price of 16,000 Rheingulden. In 1483 the Baron of Sax and local forces besieged the castle in an unsuccessful attempt to force Trivulzio to pay. However, over the following years, he broke with Milan and paid the remaining money to improve local relations. In 1490 Trivulzio expanded and strengthened the castle and sited cannons on the walls.

In 1496 he signed a treaty with the Grey League to support them with weapons and supplies in the event of a war, which he was called to do during the Swabian War and Musso War. Despite the extensive fortifications, in 1526 the newly formed Three Leagues ordered the castle abandoned and moved the administrative center of the valley to Palast Trivulzio in Roveredo.

The castle fell into ruin until 1925-26 when it was excavated and reinforced. A further project in 1986-90 restored a polygonal tower and northern and north-western walls.

== Castle site ==
The castle sprawls over the entire top of a small mountain. The walls form an irregular pentagon with five towers. The interior of the castle was home to the count's family and his soldiers as well as armories, a foundry, a bakery, a dairy, a cistern and a charnel house. The church of S. Carpoforo also stood inside the castle walls. At the foot of the castle is the Church of Santa Maria al Castello. The church was first mentioned in 1219. It houses several frescoes from the workshop of Seregnesi from the mid-15th century.

== Gallery ==
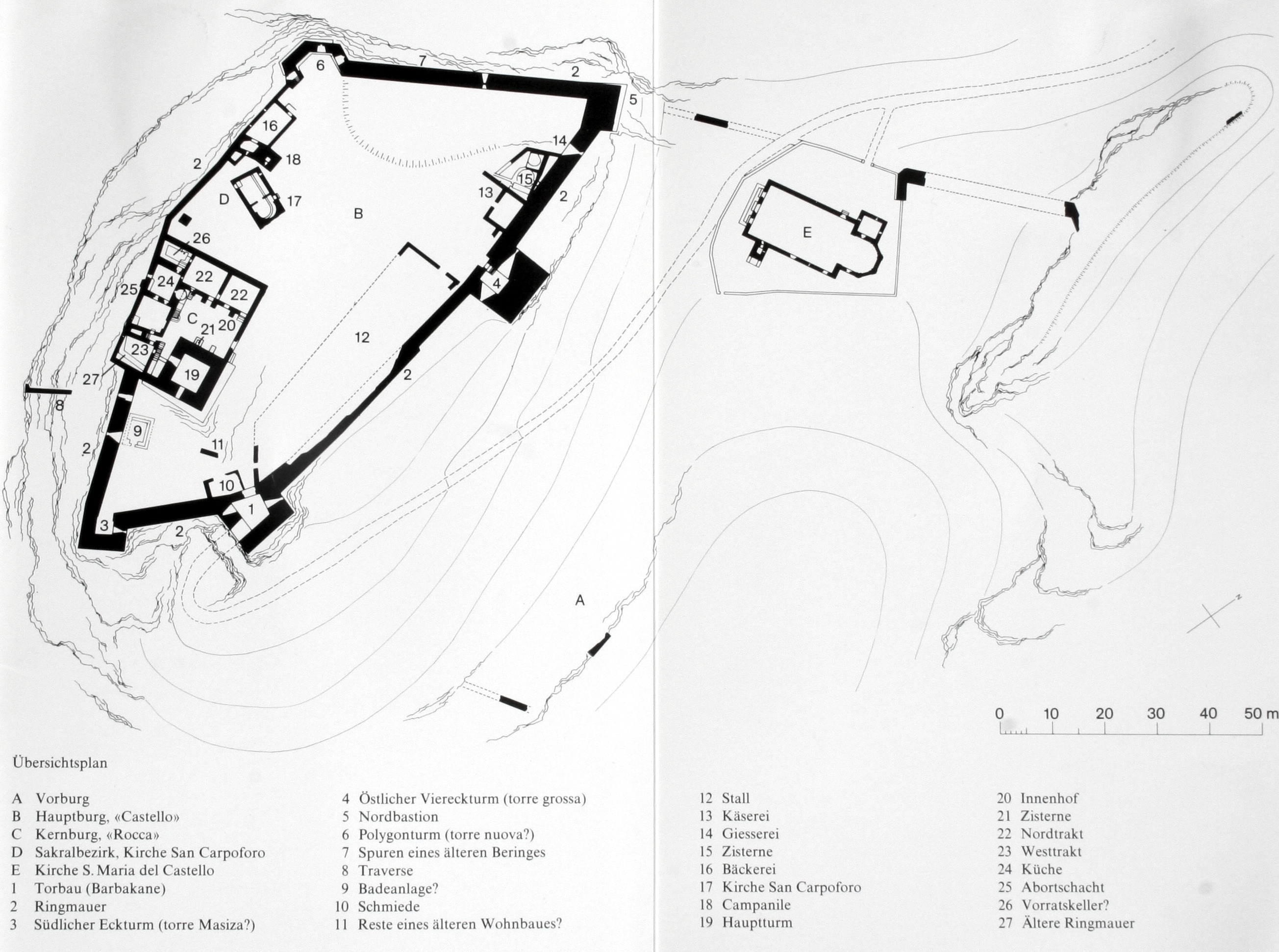
Plan of the castle

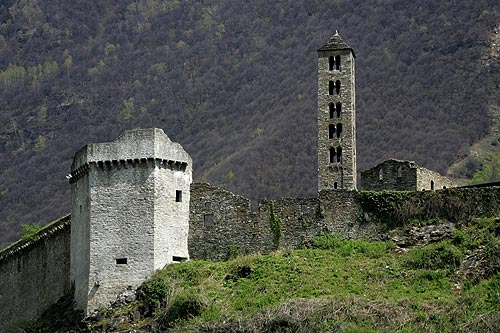
Polygonal tower and church tower

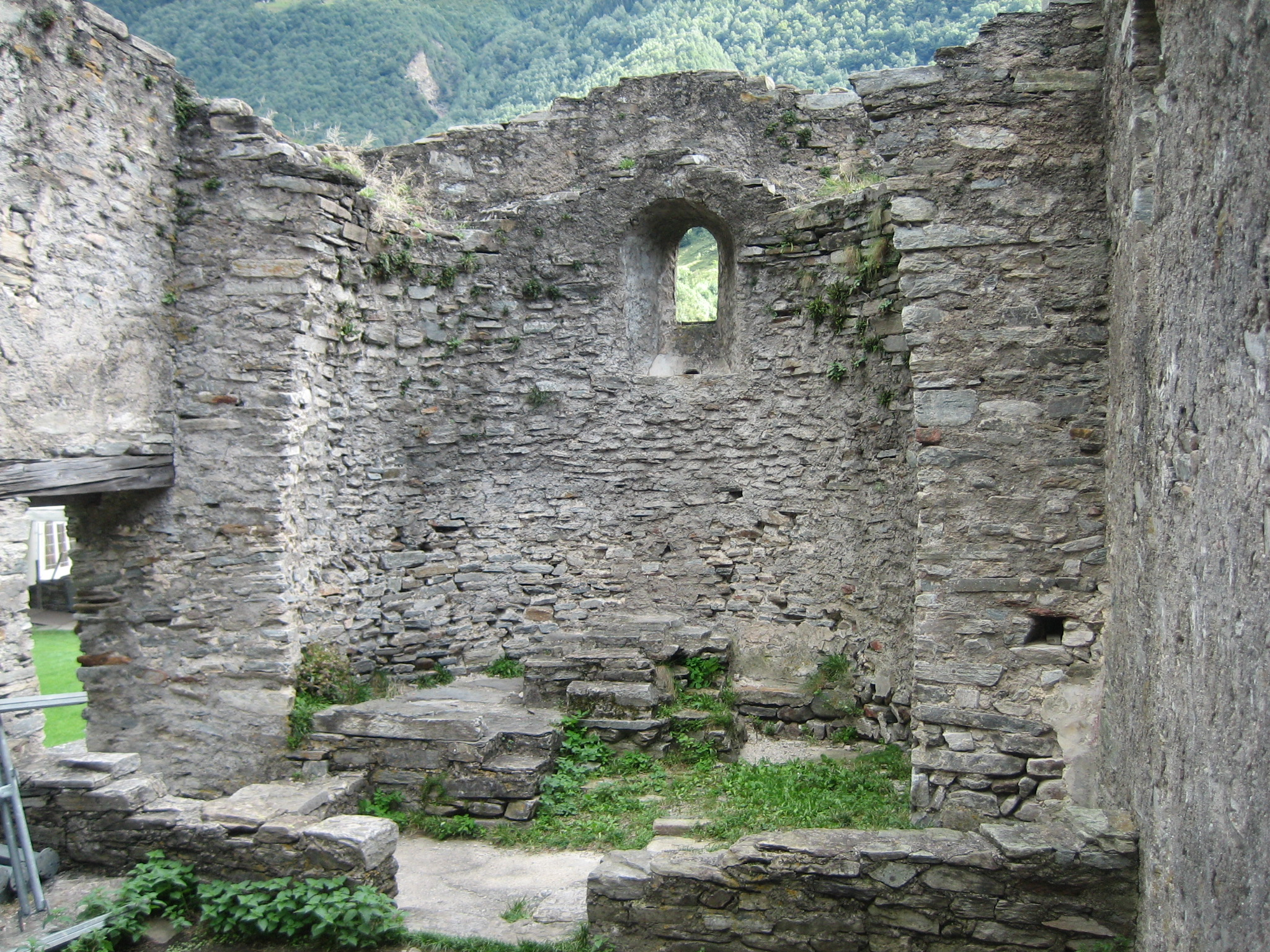
Interior of the church

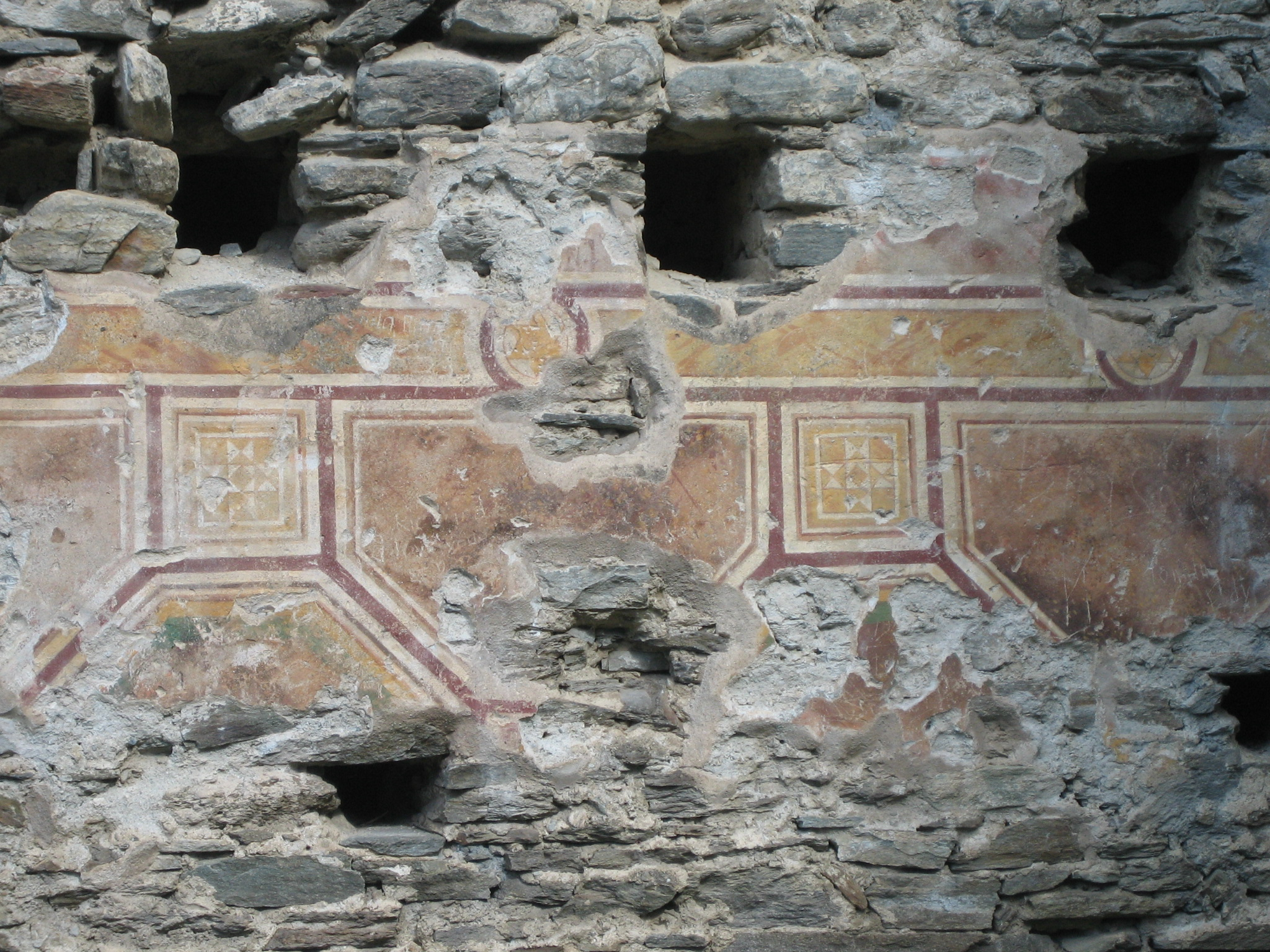
Painted designs on the walls

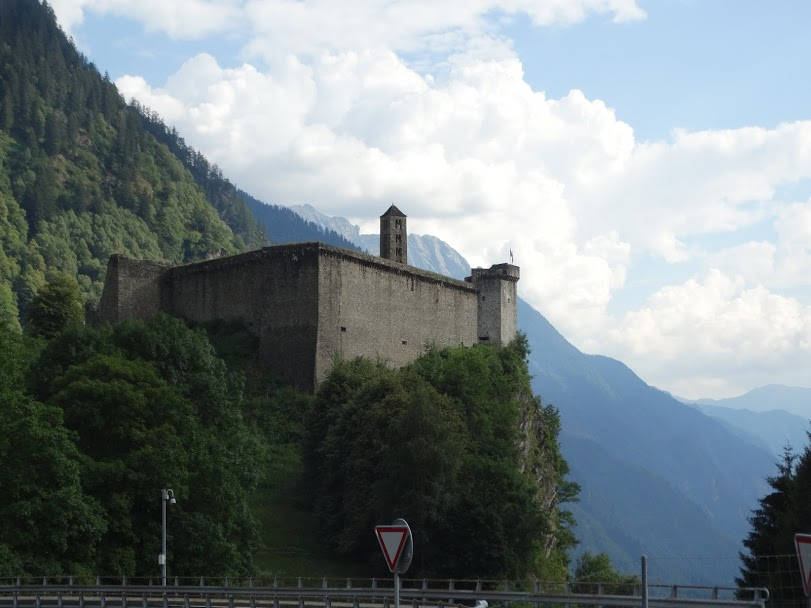
General view

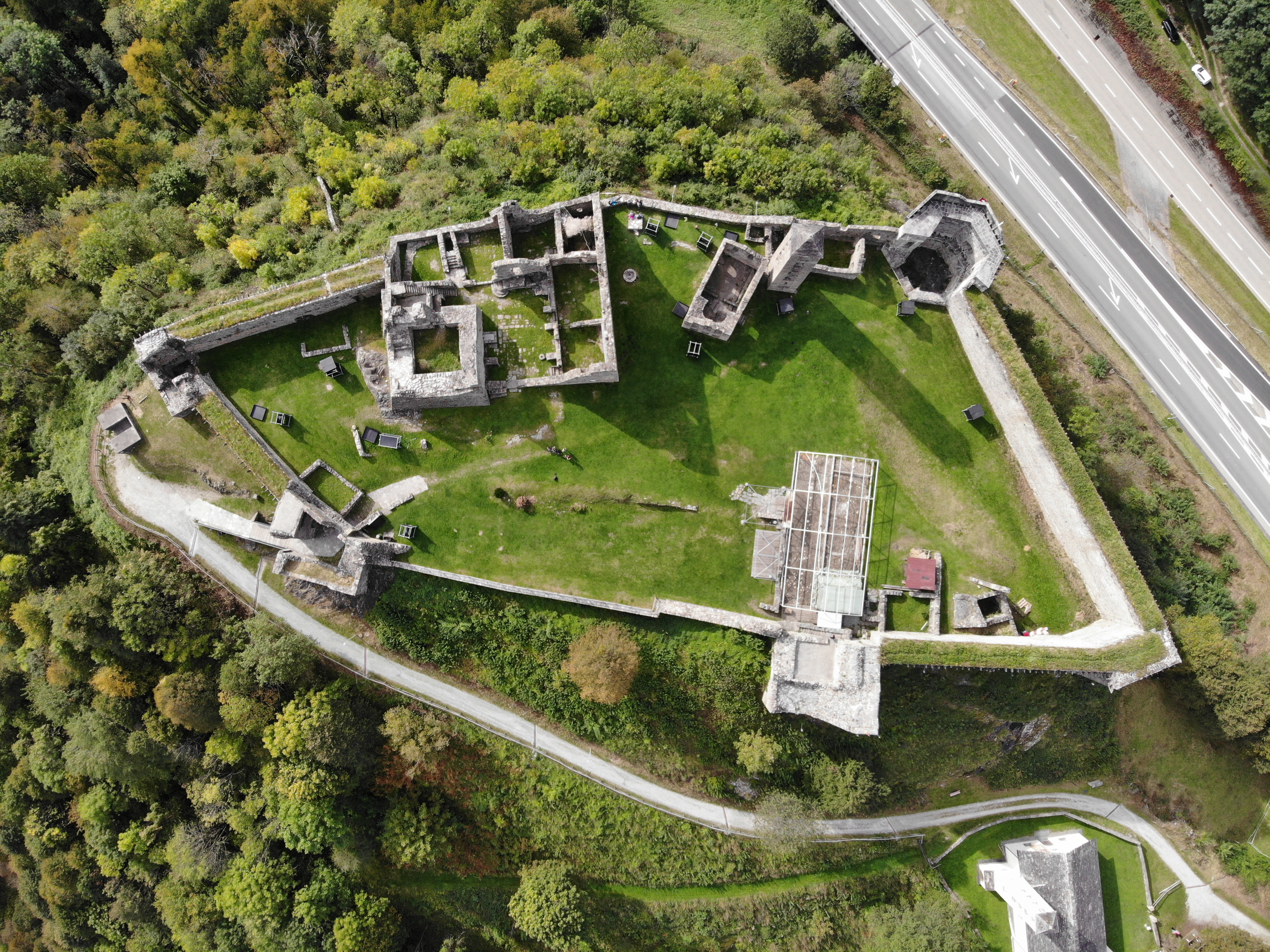
Overhead aerial image

== See also ==
- List of castles in Switzerland
