= House of Sax =

Swiss medieval noble family

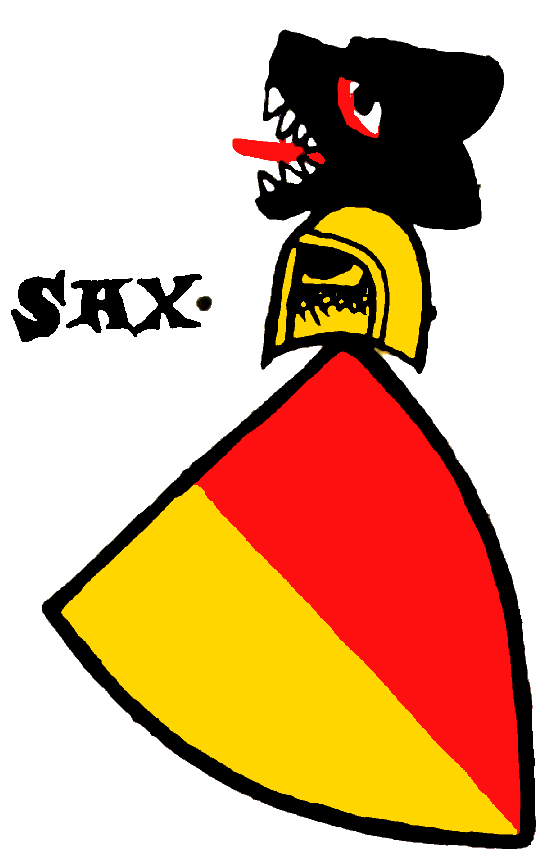
Coat of arms of the House of Sax in the Zürich armorial

Flag of the House of Sax

The noble family of Sax or Saxe (originally in Italian de Sacco) was a medieval noble family in eastern Switzerland. It owned estates and castles on both sides of the Alps in the modern cantons of St. Gallen, Graubünden and Ticino. The origin of the family is unknown, but it probably stems from Churrätien nobility and was related to the da Torre family. The family divided into two main lines; the Counts (Grafen) of Sax-Misox and the Barons (Freiherren) of Hohensax.

== Origins ==
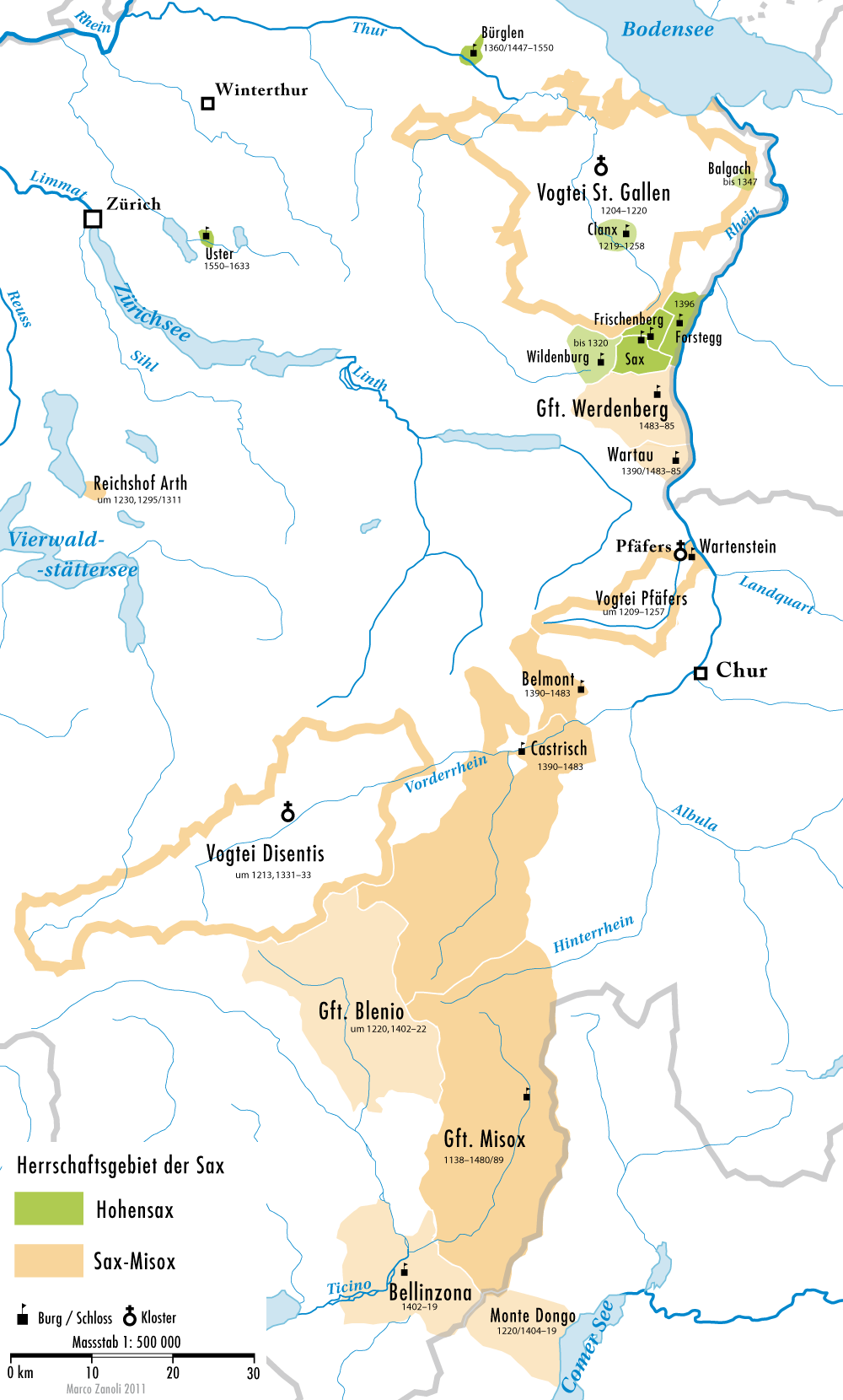
Territory of the Barons and Counts of Sax

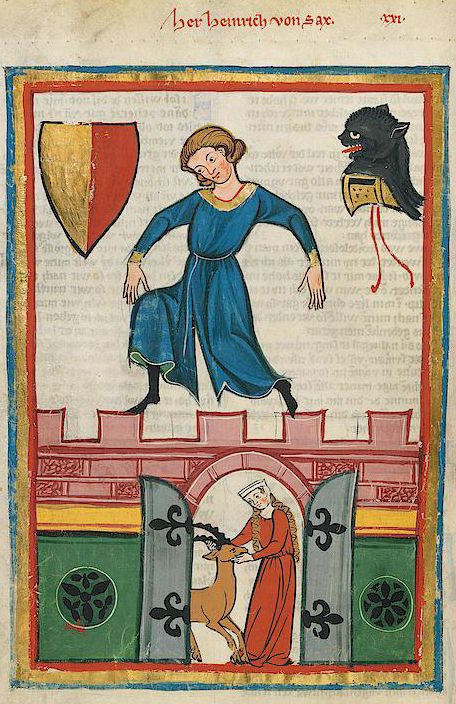
The Minnesänger Heinrich von Sax in the Codex Manesse

The earliest mention of a member of the family is in 1137/39, with Eberhard de Sacco. In 1168, a Sax was granted a fief over the Misox valley, probably as a reward for support of the Hohenstaufen family. The founder of the line was Albrecht of Sax, who first appears in a record in 1188. His brother, Heinrich, reorganized the administration of the Abbey of St. Gall and brought it under his authority. Albrecht's sons, Ulrich (first mentioned in 1204, died 23 September 1220) and Heinrich (born around 1180, last mentioned 31 March 1247) became the abbot and vogt, respectively, of the Abbey of St. Gall. Between 1208 and 1213 they became vogts of Disentis and Pfäfers Abbeys. In 1212 they supported Frederick II in his bid to become Emperor and gained extensive land and wealth from him. To protect their expansive holdings, the family built Clanx Castle in Appenzell, Hohensax Castle in Sennwald, and Mesocco Castle in Mesocco in Graubünden. In 1220, they expanded their southern holdings into the Leventina and Blenio Valleys. The next 28 years marked a high point in the family's power. In 1248, the family holdings were divided between two of Heinrich's grandsons. The southern holdings in Graubünden and Ticino as well as Clanx Castle and Pfäfers Abbey were inherited by Heinrich (first mentioned 1235, last mentioned 1258) and Albrecht (first mentioned 1236, last mentioned 1275), who became the heads of the Sax-Misox line. The northern estates around Hohensax and St. Gallen were inherited by Ulrich (first mentioned 1236, last mentioned 1257) who founded the Hohensax line.

== Sax-Misox ==
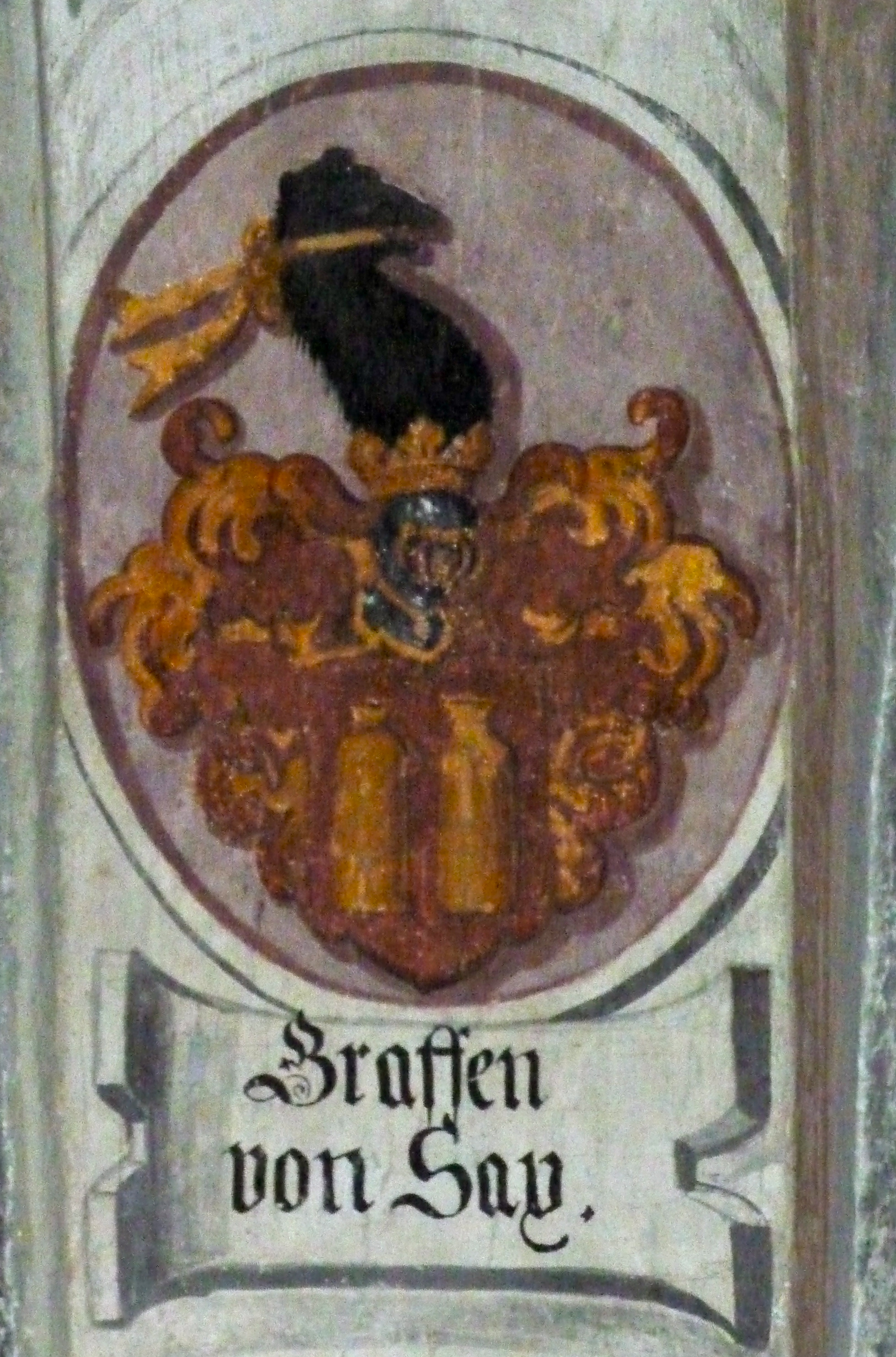
Arms of the counts of Sax-Misox in Cathedral of Chur.

In 1257 Albrecht of Sax-Misox sold Wartenstein Castle and the villages of Pfäfers, Valens, Vättis and Untervaz to Pfäfers Abbey for 300 silver marks. After the decline of the imperial Hohenstaufen family the Sax-Misox lost the Blenio Valley, Monte Dongo and Clanx Castle. Their lands were reduced to the Core of the Misox Valley with the San Bernardino Pass and the Walser settlements in the Rheinwald Valley. The distant estate at Arth was granted as a fief to Heinrich and Albrecht of Grünenfels in 1295.

Caspar of Sax-Misox (1362–90) married Elizabeth of Rhäzüns and after her grandfather died in 1380, inherited the land of the Barons of Belmont including Flims with the Belmont Castle, Graubünden, Fidaz, Gruob, Ilanz, Lugnez, Vals and Wartau. Wartau village was later sold to the Count of Werdenberg.

Caspar and Elizabeth's son, Johann von Sax-Misox (1390–1427) was initially in service to the Visconti family who were the Dukes of Milan. However, in 1402 he and his brother Albert (1390–1406) acquired the Milanese city of Bellinzona. They built castles in Gorduno, Bogiano and Roveredo to protect their conquests. A few years later, in 1406–7, they were forced to accept co-ownership of Bellinzona with Uri and Obwalden. In 1406 Albert of Sax was murdered by a distant cousin at the Torre Fiorenzana near Grono, possibly to gain favor with the Dukes of Milan. In 1413 Johann and another brother, Donat (mentioned 1400–23), supported Emperor Sigismund during his campaigns against the Venetians in Italy and were rewarded with the title of count and the right to mint coins. In 1419 they sold Bellinzona to Uri and Obwalden. When the Confederates attacked Milan in 1425, Johann remained neutral.

On 14 February 1395, the three main nobles (the abbot of Disentis, Johannes von Ilanz, Baron Ulrich II von Rhäzüns and Baron Albrecht von Sax-Misox) of the Vorderrhein together with delegates from the Court Municipalities in Ilanz created an "eternal alliance". Since the alliance was predominantly located in the high country, it was also known as Part Sura (German: Ober Bund or High Alliance). Five days later, Count Johann von Werdenberg-Sargans joined the League at Flimserwald. On 16 March 1424, the leaders, including Johann of Sax-Misox, of the alliance met under a legendary maple tree in Trun to reaffirm and expand it into the Grey League.

Johann married Catherine of Werdenberg-Heiligenberg, the co-heiress with the last Count of Toggenburg, Frederick VII. After Frederick's death in 1436, the Sax-Misox family was one of the claimants to the Toggenburg lands, which led to the Old Zürich War in 1440.

Johann's son Count Heinrich of Sax-Misox (around 1418–last mention 1479) fought to receive the Toggenburg inheritance of his mother Catherine. However, in 1437 one of the castles he claimed, Grinau Castle was given to Schwyz and in 1439 he mortgaged his claim on the county of Uznach to Schwyz and Glarus. He was part of the Confederate army which attacked the Golden Ambrosian Republic in Milan and was decisively defeated at the Battle of Castione on 6 July 1449. By the following year, he was reconciled again with the Duke of Milan. In 1458, when he was preparing to conclude an alliance with Milan, there was an uprising in the Grey League, which was settled amicably thanks to the mediation of the abbot of Disentis. In 1479 he was party to a peace treaty signed by the Swiss Confederation and the Duchy of Milan. In the same year he abdicated and gave his lands to his son Johann-Peter.

Johann Peter (1462–1540) was the last Count of Sax-Misox. He fought numerous incursions into his lands by the Confederation, Milan and the cadet line of Sax-Grono. As Milan the still occupied the Misox valley, he sold it in 1480 to the Milanese commander Gian Giacomo Trivulzio. Three years later he sold the estates in the high valleys of Graubünden. Through his second marriage with the Countess Clementine from Montfort-Werdenberg, Johann Peter gained the county of Werdenberg and Wartau in 1483. Short of money he sold Werdenberg and Wartau and to the city of Lucerne in 1485. Impoverished, he entered the service of the Dukes of Austria and Milan. He died in Castrisch and was buried in the local church.

A number of cadet branches of the Sax-Misox line came into being in the 13th century including Sax-Grono, Sax-Palazio and Sax-Norantola.

== Hohensax ==
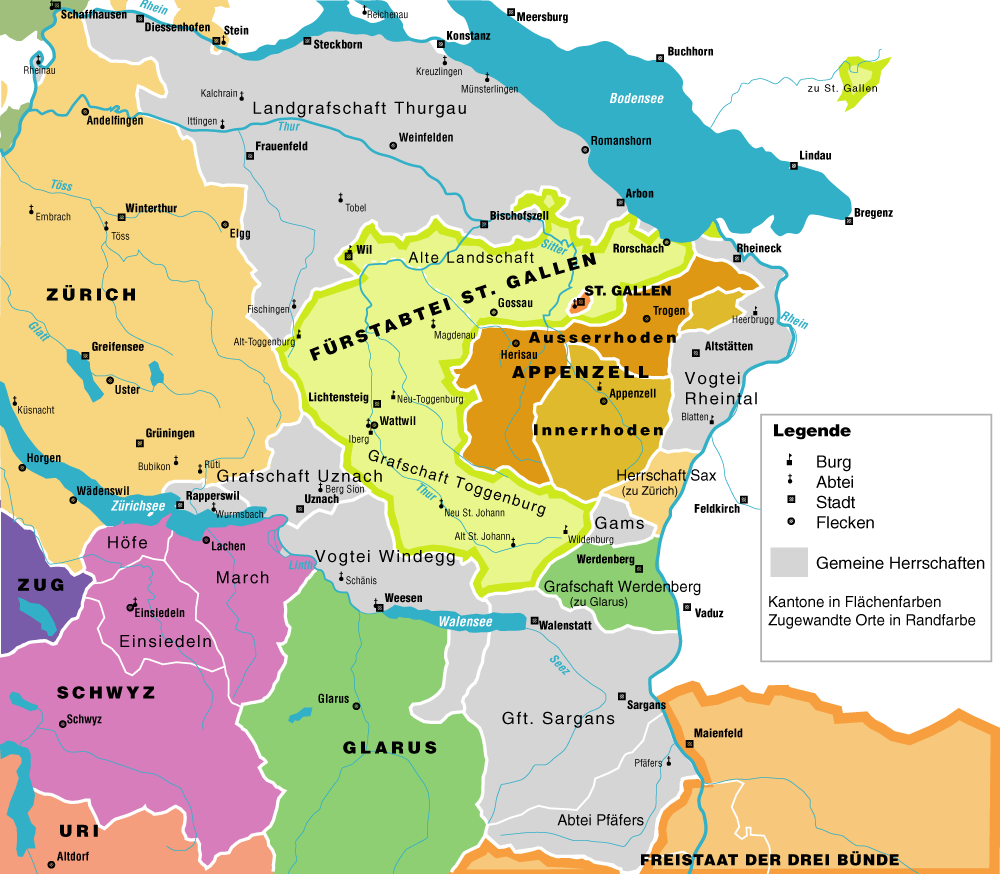
The political situation in eastern Switzerland during the Old Confederation (before 1798)

During the 14th century, the Hohensax family allied closely with the Austrian Habsburgs. One of the first Ulrich of Hohensax decedents, also named Ulrich was an Austrian commander and died at the Battle of Näfels in 1388. By 1393 Hohensax Castle was an Austrian fief. The Appenzell Wars (1401–29) allowed Ulrich Eberhard the Younger (mentioned 1384–1414) and his wife Elizabeth of Werdenberg-Sargans to gain independence from the Habsburgs. By supporting Appenzell's revolt, their castles were not destroyed and they were able to sign treaties with the victorious Appenzellers. His sons Rudolf and Gerold were both abbots of Einsiedeln in 1438–47 and 1452–69 respectively.

As the only male heir, Albert I of Hohensax (1439–1463) inherited all the estates of the entire Hohensax family line. He was also able to gain some financial security by marrying Ursula Mötteli. After his death, his sister inherited Hohensax and Frischenberg Castles along with the associated villages of Gams and Sax. Elisabeth of Hohensax was married to Kaspar of Bonstetten, a citizen of Zurich, so during the Old Zurich War the Appenzellers attacked and burned both castles. In the peace treaty they returned the ruins of Hohensax and the village of Gams, but retained Frischenberg Castle and the village of Sax.

The son of Albert and Ursula, Ulrich of Hohensax (1463–1538) consolidated the family lands in the Rhine valley and the Thurgau and was the mayor of Zurich. During the Burgundian Wars, he fought on the side of Zurich and was knighted. Between 1487 and 1497 he was a condottieri or mercenary leader in Habsburg service. However, two years later, in 1499 he fought in the Battle of Frastanz of the Swabian War on the side of the Swiss Confederation. In the following years, 1501 and 1503, he served as imperial envoy in the Confederation. At the same time, in 1503, he represented the Confederation in the negotiations that lead to the Treaty of Arona which helped fix the Swiss southern border. Over the next two decades he was a soldier and diplomat for the Holy Roman Emperor, the Confederation and the French. In 1529 he embraced the new faith of the Protestant Reformation and spread it throughout his lands. However, in 1531 he abandoned his new faith and returned to the Catholic faith.

His son Ulrich Philipp (1531–85) followed in his father's footsteps and served in both Imperial and French armies. He embraced the Reformed faith in 1564 and converted the Hohensax lands back to the Reformation. After his death in 1585, the family fortunes began to decline. Johann Albrecht (1545–1597) killed Governor Georg Trösch of Sargans in a brawl and fled to Spain, spending over 15 years in Spanish military service. Johann Philipp of Hohensax (1553–96) served in the Palatinate and in the Netherlands and was the governor of Geldern in 1578. During his travels, he acquired the Codex Manesse, the single most comprehensive source of Middle High German Minnesang poetry, written and illustrated between ca. 1304 and 1340. He got into a dispute over inheritance with his brother Johann Albrecht, whose son Georg Ulrich 1596 mortally wounded him in Salez. His body was in 1730 found incorrupt in the family vault in Sennwald, where it was exhibited until the 1970s as a "mummy of Sennwald".

Friedrich Ludwig (1589–1629), son of Johann Philipp, sold in 1615 two thirds of the County of Sax-Forstegg to Zurich. The last of the family of the Hohensax, Christoph Friedrich (1620–1633), also sold the rest of the Sax-Forstegg County to Zurich. He died in 1633 at Burg Uster.

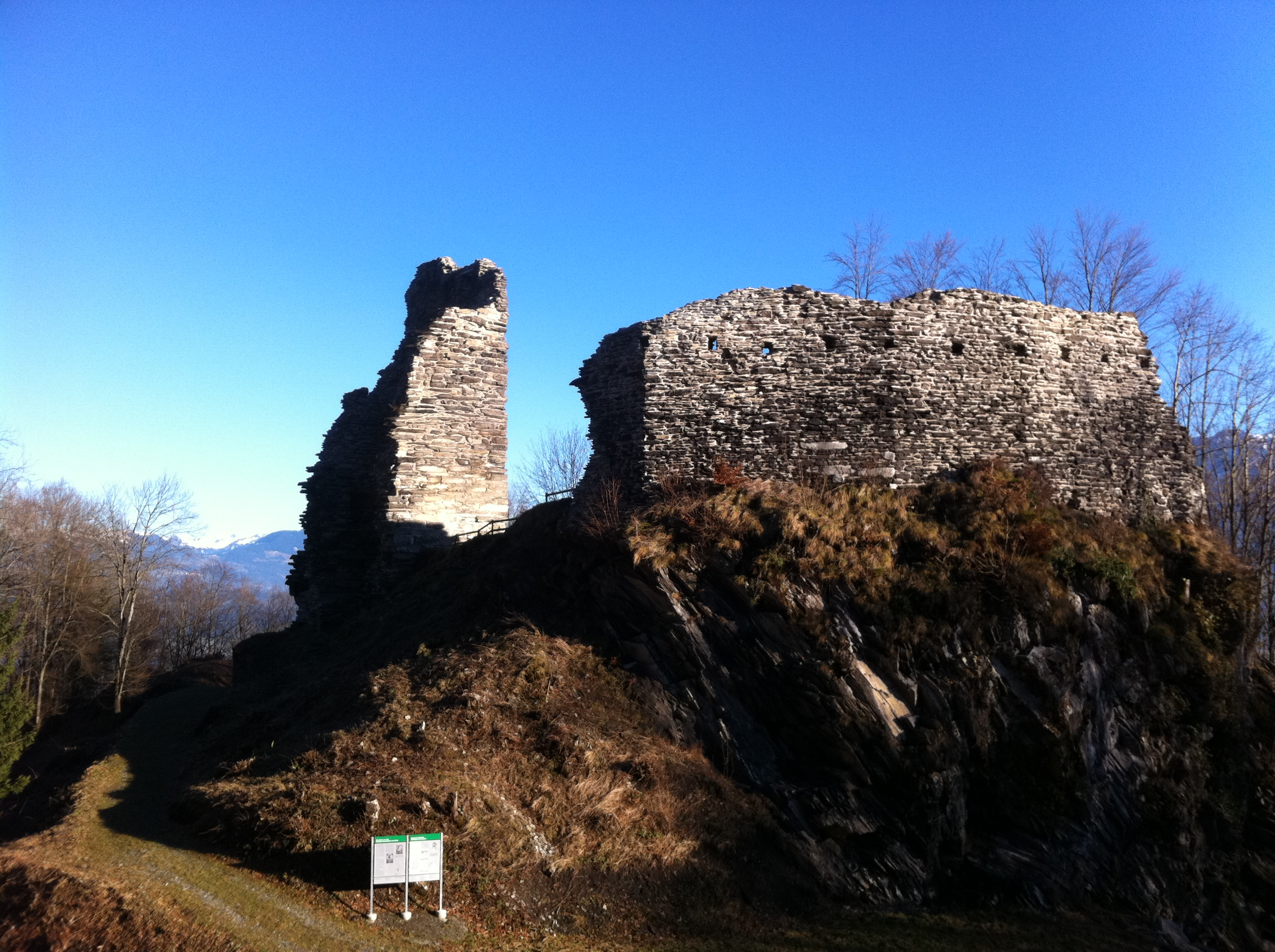
Hohensax Castle

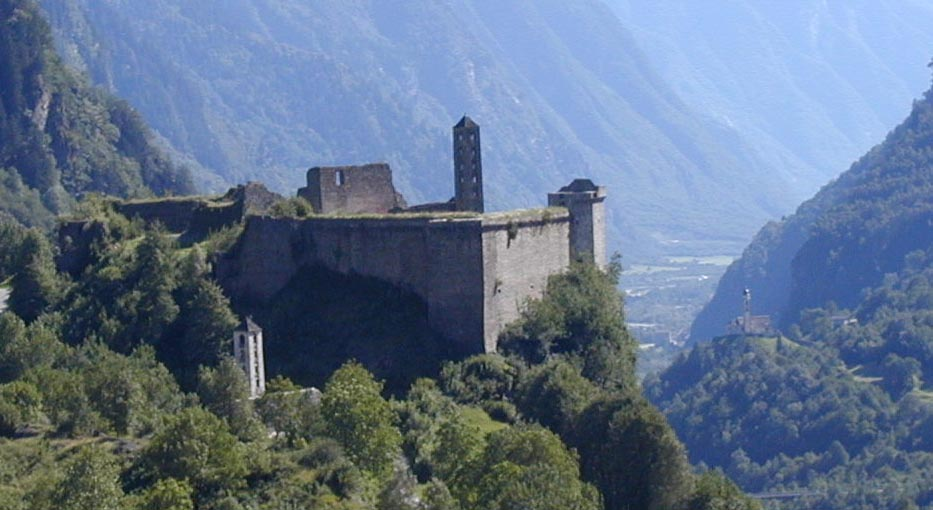
Mesocco Castle (Misox)

== In popular culture ==
The Swiss writer Adolf Muschg's novel Sax (2010) is based on the family history of the Hohensax.

== Sources ==
- Anna-Maria Deplazes-Haefliger: "Sax, von (de Sacco)" in German, French and Italian in the online Historical Dictionary of Switzerland.
- Historisch-Bibliographisches Lexikon der Schweiz. Bd. 6, Neuenburg 1931, S. 106–109.
- Bündner Monatsblatt. 1/2009; S. 64 ff., Beitrag von Heinz Gabathuler.
- Historisches Lexikon des Fürstentums Liechtenstein: Sax (Artikel von Mathias Bugg und Hans Jakob Reich) Vaduz und Zürich 2013, Bd. 2, S. 811
- Adolf Muschg: Sax. Roman. C. H. Beck Verlag, München 2010, ISBN 978-3-406-60517-8.
