= Sennwald =

- Municipality
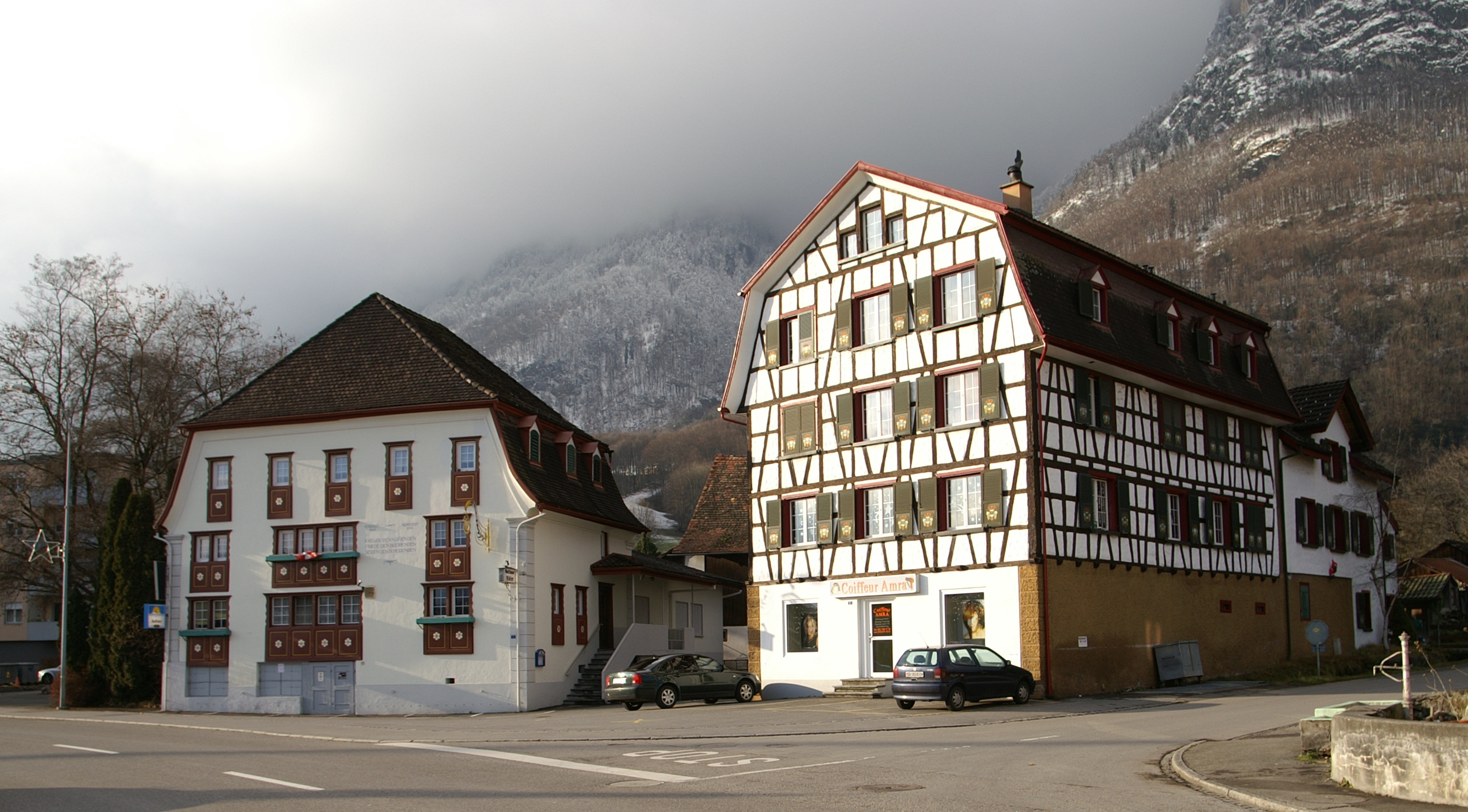
- Sennwald village

- Coat of arms
- Location of Sennwald
- Location within Switzerland Location within Canton of St. Gallen
- Coordinates: 47°16′N 9°30′E
- Country: Switzerland
- Canton: St. Gallen
- District: Werdenberg

Government
  - Mayor: Bertrand Hug Ind.

Area
  - Total: 41.53 km^{2} (16.03 sq mi)
- Elevation: 446 m (1,463 ft)

Population (December 2020)
  - Total: 5,709
  - Density: 137.5/km^{2} (356.0/sq mi)
- Time zone: UTC+01:00 (CET)
  - Summer (DST): UTC+02:00 (CEST)
- Postal code: 9466
- SFOS number: 3274
- ISO 3166 code: CH-SG
- Localities: Sennwald, Frümsen, Salez, Haag, Sax
- Surrounded by: Altstätten, Buchs, Eschen (LI), Gamprin (LI), Gams, Ruggell (LI), Rüte (AI), Wildhaus
- Website: www.sennwald.ch

Sennwald is a municipality in the Wahlkreis (constituency) of Werdenberg in the canton of St. Gallen in Switzerland.

== Geography ==
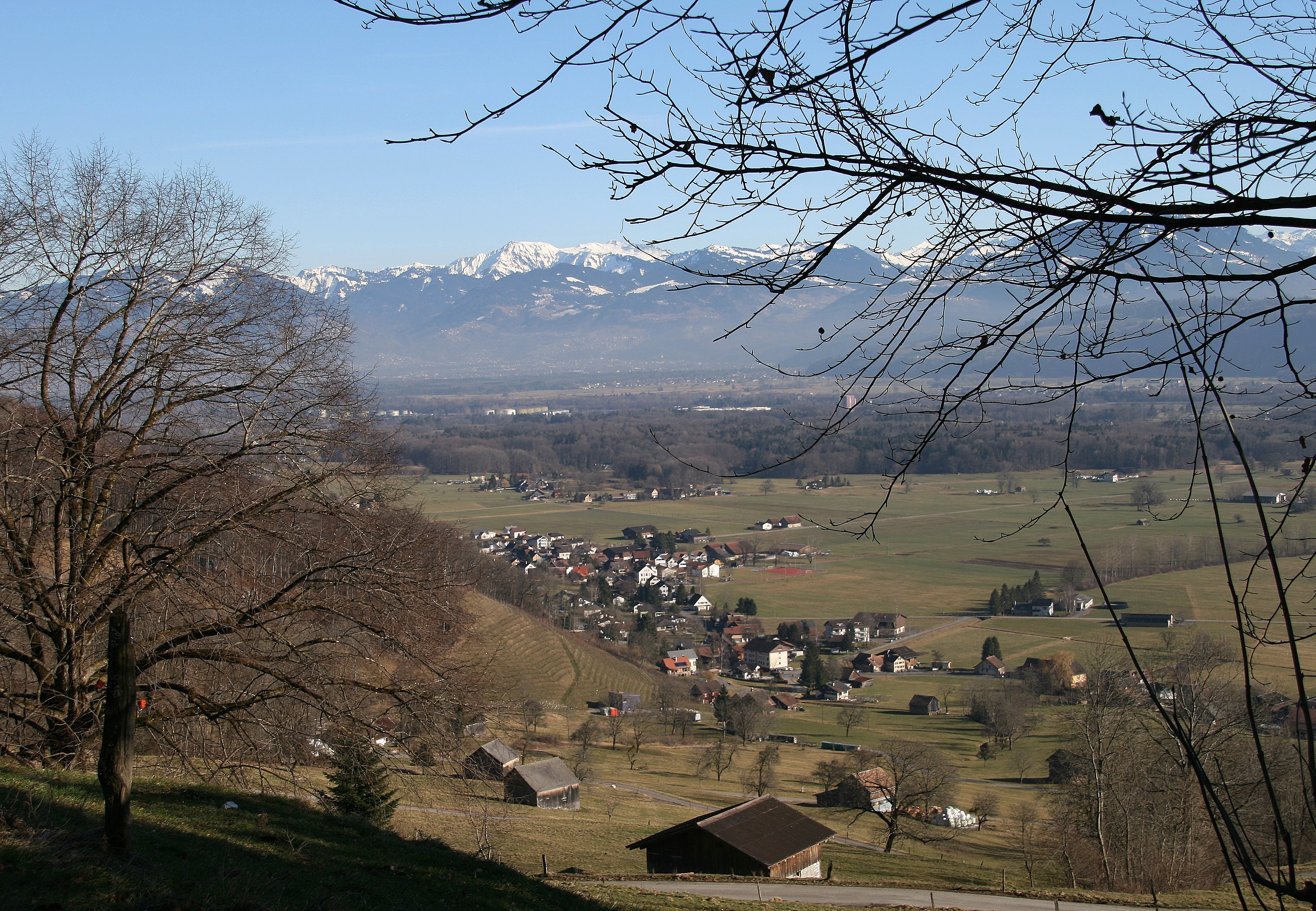
View from "Trübliweg" toward the village of Frümsen

Aerial view (1964)

Sennwald has an area, as of 2006, of 41.5 km^{2} (16.0 sq mi). Of this area, 49.9% is used for agricultural purposes, while 31.5% is forested. Of the rest of the land, 9.4% is settled (buildings or roads) and the remainder (9.3%) is non-productive (rivers or lakes).

== Coat of arms ==
The blazon of the municipal coat of arms is the historical coat of arms of the barons of Hohensax, Per pale Or and Gules. It was adopted as the municipal coat of arms, with added diapering, in 1937.

== Demographics ==
Sennwald has a population (as of 31 December 2020) of 5,709. As of 2007, about 22.6% of the population was made up of foreign nationals. Of the foreign population, (as of 2000), 79 are from Germany, 65 are from Italy, 391 are from ex-Yugoslavia, 116 are from Austria, 66 are from Turkey, and 103 are from another country. Over the last 10 years the population has grown at a rate of 11.6%. Most of the population (as of 2000) speaks German (90.7%), with Serbo-Croatian being second most common ( 3.6%) and Albanian being third ( 1.5%). Of the Swiss national languages (as of 2000), 4,067 speak German, 9 people speak French, 51 people speak Italian, and 11 people speak Romansh.

The age distribution, as of 2000, in Sennwald is; 565 children or 12.6% of the population are between 0 and 9 years old and 662 teenagers or 14.8% are between 10 and 19. Of the adult population, 540 people or 12.0% of the population are between 20 and 29 years old. 739 people or 16.5% are between 30 and 39, 739 people or 16.5% are between 40 and 49, and 538 people or 12.0% are between 50 and 59. The senior population distribution is 343 people or 7.6% of the population are between 60 and 69 years old, 237 people or 5.3% are between 70 and 79, there are 103 people or 2.3% who are between 80 and 89, and there are 18 people or 0.4% who are between 90 and 99.

In 2000 there were 500 persons (or 11.2% of the population) who were living alone in a private dwelling. There were 948 (or 21.1%) persons who were part of a couple (married or otherwise committed) without children, and 2,591 (or 57.8%) who were part of a couple with children. There were 218 (or 4.9%) people who lived in single parent home, while there are 22 persons who were adult children living with one or both parents, 14 persons who lived in a household made up of relatives, 20 who lived household made up of unrelated persons, and 171 who are either institutionalized or live in another type of collective housing.

In the 2007 federal election the most popular party was the SVP which received 42.3% of the vote. The next three most popular parties were the FDP (19.1%), the SP (15%) and the CVP (10.3%).

In Sennwald about 65.5% of the population (between age 25–64) have completed either non-mandatory upper secondary education or additional higher education (either university or a Fachhochschule). Out of the total population in Sennwald, as of 2000, the highest education level completed by 1,074 people (24.0% of the population) was Primary, while 1,579 (35.2%) have completed their secondary education, 393 (8.8%) have attended a Tertiary school, and 185 (4.1%) are not in school. The remainder did not answer this question.

== Economy ==
As of 2007, Sennwald had an unemployment rate of 1.29%. As of 2005, there were 278 people employed in the primary economic sector and about 90 businesses involved in this sector. 1,637 people are employed in the secondary sector and there are 66 businesses in this sector. 973 people are employed in the tertiary sector, with 135 businesses in this sector.

As of October 2009 the average unemployment rate was 3.6%. There were 283 businesses in the municipality of which 58 were involved in the secondary sector of the economy while 141 were involved in the third.

As of 2000 there were 1,184 residents who worked in the municipality, while 1,254 residents worked outside Sennwald and 1,704 people commuted into the municipality for work.

The kybun Corporation of the Swiss engineer Karl Müller produces a part of its shoes in Sennwald.

== Religion ==
From the 2000 census, 1,355 or 30.2% are Roman Catholic, while 2,176 or 48.5% belonged to the Swiss Reformed Church. Of the rest of the population, there is 1 individual who belongs to the Christian Catholic faith, there are 153 individuals (or about 3.41% of the population) who belong to the Orthodox Church, and there are 56 individuals (or about 1.25% of the population) who belong to another Christian church. There are 295 (or about 6.58% of the population) who are Islamic. There are 29 individuals (or about 0.65% of the population) who belong to another church (not listed on the census), 256 (or about 5.71% of the population) belong to no church, are agnostic or atheist, and 163 individuals (or about 3.64% of the population) did not answer the question.

== See also ==
- Salez-Sennwald railway station
