= 1974–75 FC Basel season =

FC Basel
1974–75 season
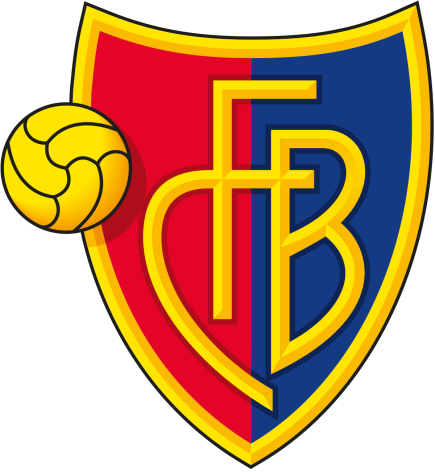
- Chairman: Félix Musfeld
- Manager: Helmut Benthaus
- Ground: St. Jakob Stadium, Basel
- Nationalliga A: 4th
- Swiss Cup: Winners
- Swiss League Cup: Semi-finals
- Coppa delle Alpi: Runners-up
- Top goalscorer: League: Ottmar Hitzfeld (13); All: Ottmar Hitzfeld (22)
- Highest home attendance: 18,000 on 5 October 1974 vs Zürich
- Lowest home attendance: 3,000 on 31 May 1975 vs St. Gallen
- Average home league attendance: 7,961

The Fussball Club Basel 1893 1974–75 season was their 81st season since the club was founded. It was their 29th consecutive season in the top flight of Swiss football after they won promotion during the 1945–46 season. They played their home games in the St. Jakob Stadium. Félix Musfeld was club chairman for the fifth consecutive period.

== Overview ==
=== Pre-season ===
Helmut Benthaus was first team manager for the tenth consecutive season. There were a few amendments to the team. Josef Kiefer, now coming to the end of his active career, went on to play for FC Breitenbach. Kiefer had been with the club for 12 seasons. Between the years 1962 and 1974 he had played a total of 355 games for Basel; 170 of these games were in the domestic league. He had won the championship five times and the Swiss Cup once. A number of other players also left the club: Teófilo Cubillas went on to Porto, Rudolf Wampfler to Fribourg, Peter Wenger went on to Nordstern Basel and Felix Tschudin moved on to local club SC Binningen. In an inwards direction, Fritz Wirth joined on loan from Grenchen, Roland Schönenberger signed from Wangen bei Olten and Danish international Eigil Nielsen signed from Winterthur.

Basel played a total of 51 games in their 1974–75 season. 26 in the domestic league, seven in the Swiss Cup, four in the Swiss League Cup, five in the Cup of the Alps and nine were friendly matches. The team scored a total of 123 goals and conceded 66. Basel won all nine friendly games, of which three were played at home and the other six away.

=== Domestic league ===
The Nationalliga A season 1974–75 was contested by 14 teams. These were the top 12 teams from the previous 1973–74 season and the two newly promoted teams Luzern and Vevey-Sports. The championship was played in a double round robin. The champions would qualify for the 1975–76 European Cup, the second and third placed teams were to qualify for the 1975–76 UEFA Cup and the last two teams in the table at the end of the season were to be relegated. Zürich won the championship six points ahead of both BSC Young Boys who were second, and Grasshopper Club who were third. Basel finished in fourth position with 31 points. They won 11 of their 26 league games, drew nine, and lost six games. They scored a total of 49 goals, conceding 33. Ottmar Hitzfeld was the team's top goal scorer with 13 league goals; Roland Schönenberger second top scorer with six; Peter Ramseier, Walter Mundschin and Walter Balmer each scored five league goals. The poor results in this and the two previous seasons were now also being reflected in the match attendances. Where as in the 1971–72 season each but one match had attracted more than 10,000 spectators, this season only two games were attended by more than 10,000 people. The average number of spectators had halved within just three years.

=== Swiss Cup and League Cup ===
In the 50th Swiss Cup tournament Basel played the round of 32 on 21 September 1974 away against Chiasso in the Stadio Comunale and in the round of 16 away against Zürich in the Letzigrund. The quarter-finals were two legged fixtures. Basel played the first leg on 30 October 1974 away in Stade de la Fontenette and the return leg on 3 November 1974 in the St. Jakob Stadium against Étoile Carouge. Both games ended with a 2–1 victory, and so Basel qualified 4–2 on aggregate for the next round. The semi-finals were played in March against Chênois and were also a two legged fixture. In the first leg, played in Stade des Trois-Chêne, Basel achieved a 4–1 victory, and the second leg ended with a 2–1 victory. The final was played on 31 March 1975 in the Wankdorf Stadium in Bern against Winterthur. Otto Demarmels scored the opening goal for Basel, E. Meyer equalised and so the game went into extra time. Walter Balmer scored the winning goal for Basel after 115 minutes. Basel was a Swiss Cup winner for the fifth time in the club's history.

The Swiss League Cup ended for Basel in the semi-final as they were beaten 1–3 at home against Grasshopper Club. They had beaten Young Boys in the round of 32, Luzern in the round of 16, and Aarau in the quarter-final. Basel was not qualified to play European matches, but they played in the Coppa delle Alpi and won the group stage and thus reached the final, only to lose 1–2 against BSC Young Boys.

=== Coppa delle Alpi ===
In the Cup of the Alps Basel was drawn into group B. The first match was played at home against the French team Olympique Lyonnais. The match was drawn 1–1 on 13 July 1974; Fritz Wirth equalised for Basel soon after halftime after Ildo Maneiro had put the French team ahead shortly before the break. On 20 July the second round was played, and Basel travelled to France to play against Nîmes Olympique. Basel won 4–2 thanks to a hat-trick from Eigil Nielsen and a goal from Ottmar Hitzfeld. Matchday three was on 23 July in Lyon and Basel won the return game against Olympique Lyonnais 3–1, thanks to goals from Jörg Stohler, Walter Balmer and Roland Schönenberger. Despite the fact that FCB lost the return game against Nîmes Olympique they were group winners and advanced to the final. The final was played on 30 July in the St. Jakob Stadium against Young Boys, but this ended with a 1–2 defeat.

== Players ==
Note: Flags indicate national team as defined under FIFA eligibility rules; some limited exceptions apply. Players may hold more than one non-FIFA nationality.

No.	Pos.	Nation	Player
1	GK	SUI	Marcel Kunz
2	DF	SUI	Alex Wirth (reserves)
3	DF	SUI	Walter Mundschin
4	MF	SUI	Peter Ramseier
5	DF	SUI	Paul Fischli
6	MF	SUI	Otto Demarmels
7	FW	SUI	Walter Balmer
8	MF	SUI	Karl Odermatt
9	FW	GER	Ottmar Hitzfeld
10	DF	SUI	René Hasler
11	FW	SUI	Fritz Wirth (from Grenchen)

No.	Pos.	Nation	Player
12	MF	SUI	Bruno Rahmen
13	FW	SUI	Markus Tanner
14	DF	SUI	Jörg Stohler
16	MF	SUI	Heinz Schönebeck
17	MF	SUI	Arthur von Wartburg
18	FW	SUI	Roland Schönenberger (from Wangen bei Olten)
19	MF	DEN	Eigil Nielsen (from Winterthur)
22	GK	SUI	Hans Müller
23	GK	SUI	Thomas Manger (reserves)
—	MF	GER	Martin Hägele (reserves)
—	MF	SUI	Roland Paolucci (reserves)

Players who left the squad

Note: Flags indicate national team as defined under FIFA eligibility rules; some limited exceptions apply. Players may hold more than one non-FIFA nationality.

No.	Pos.	Nation	Player
—	DF	GER	Josef Kiefer (to FC Breitenbach)
—	MF	SUI	Rudolf Wampfler (to Fribourg)
—	MF	SUI	Felix Tschudin (to SC Binningen)

No.	Pos.	Nation	Player
—	FW	PER	Teófilo Cubillas (to Porto)
—	FW	SUI	Peter Wenger (to Nordstern Basel)
—	FW	SUI	Roger Ries (reserves)

== Results ==
Legend

Win Draw Loss Postponed

=== Friendly matches ===
==== Pre-season and mid-season ====
July 1974 Pre-season	Basel (Switzerland)	4–0	(Switzerland) Concordia Basel	Basel
	Goal	Summary

July 1974 Pre-season	FC Pratteln (Switzerland)	1–7	(Switzerland) Basel	Pratteln
	Goal	Summary	Goal

1 October 1974 Mid-season	Basel (Switzerland)	4–3	(Italy) Lazio	St. Jakob Stadium, Basel
20:00	Schönenberger 44' (1:1); Schönenberger 56' (2:1); Mundschin 65' (3:2); Tanner 69' (4:2)	Summary	17' (o.g. 0:1); 60' (2:2) Chinaglia; 89' (pen. 4:3) Chinaglia	Attendance: 6,500; Referee: (Switzerland) André Favre Echallens

==== Winter break and mid-season ====
2 February 1975 Winter break	Basel (Switzerland)	5–1	(Switzerland) Servette	Landhof, Basel
14:30	Morgenegg 38' (o.g. 1:0); Mundschin 53' (2:0); Stohler 63' (3:0); Schönenberger 64' (4:0); Wirth 85' (5:1)	Summary	66' (pen. 4:1) Pfister	Attendance: 1,200; Referee: (Switzerland) Wertli Volketswil

8 February 1975 Winter break	Karlsruher SC (West Germany)	1–2	(Switzerland) Basel	Wildparkstadion, Karlsruhe
	Haunstein 3' (1:0); Trenkl (penalty missed) 77′	Summary	65' (1:1) Balmer; 85' (1:2) Schönenberger	Attendance: 4,000

15 February 1975 Winter break	Basel (Switzerland)	3–0	(Switzerland) Zürich	St. Jakob Stadium, Basel
18:00	Balmer 2' (1:0); Stohler 39' (2:0); Hasler 69' (3:0)	FCB summary FCZ summary	(penalty missed) 88′ Rutschmann	Attendance: 2,500; Referee: (Switzerland) Rudolf Renggli (Luzern)

22 February 1975 Winter break	Nordstern Basel (Switzerland)	0–1	(Switzerland) Basel	Stadion Rankhof, Basel
14:30		Summary	74' (0:1) von Wartburg	Attendance: 2,600; Referee: (Switzerland) Haldimann Lugnorre

1 March 1975 Winter break	FC Fribourg (Switzerland)	3–5	(Switzerland) Basel	Stade Universitaire Saint-Léonard, Fribourg
	Dorthe 25' (1:3); Dorthe 50' (2:4); Degen 58' (3:4)	Summary	8' (0:1) Demarmels; 15' (0:2) Hitzfeld; 18' (0:2) Ramseier; 37' (1:4) Balmer; 73' (3:5) Balmer	Attendance: 1,000; Referee: (Switzerland) Zbinden Düdingen

8 May 1975 Mid-season	Manchester United (England)	1–3	(Switzerland) Basel	Stadtstadion Lörrach
17:30	Longhnane 86' (1:3)	Summary	29' (0:1) Hitzfeld; 55' (0:2) Schönenberger; 73' (0:3) Schönenberger	Attendance: 5,500; Referee: (West Germany) Ehrenfried Grether

=== Nationalliga ===
==== League matches ====
17 August 1974 Round 1	Basel	2–2	Xamax	St. Jakob Stadium, Basel
20:00	Hitzfeld; Mundschin	Summary	(yellow card) 44' Richard; (yellow card) 66' Lusent	Attendance: 9,500; Referee: (Switzerland) Roland Racine Prilly

24 August 1974 Round 2	Lausanne-Sport	1–1	Basel	Olympique de la Pontaise, Lausanne
20:30	Traber 84' (1:1)	Summary	61' (0:1) Ramseier	Attendance: 8,500; Referee: (Switzerland) Walter Hungerbühler St. Gallen

31 August 1974 Round 3	Basel	5–0	Winterthur	St. Jakob Stadium, Basel
20:00	Hitzfeld 42' (1:0); Balmer 52' (2:0) von Wartburg 80' (3:0); Hitzfeld 88' (pen. 4:0); Hitzfeld 90' (5:0)	Summary		Attendance: 6,500; Referee: (Switzerland) René Matthieu

7 September 1974 Round 4	Sion	1–1	Basel	Stade Tourbillon, Sion
20:15	Valentini (yellow card) 60'; Luisier 75' (1:1)	Summary	17' (0:1) Hitzfeld; (yellow card) 76' Hasler	Attendance: 8,000; Referee: (Switzerland) Giovanni Fazzini Osogna

11 September 1972 Round 5	Grasshopper Club	1–1	Basel	Hardturm, Zürich
20:15	T. Niggl 12' (1:0); Grahn (yellow card) 85'	Summary	31' (1:1) Ramseier	Attendance: 15,000; Referee: (Switzerland) Roland Racine Prilly

14 September 1974 Round 6	Basel	3–0	Luzern	St. Jakob Stadium, Basel
20:00	Christen 65' (o.g. 1:0); Hitzfeld 81' (2:0); Balmer 90+1' (3:0)	Summary	(yellow card) 41' Coray	Attendance: 9,500; Referee: (Switzerland) Ulysse Darbellay Roche

Round 7	Servette	PP	Basel	Charmilles Stadium, Geneva
		[ Summary]

5 October 1974 Round 8	Basel	1–0	Zürich	St. Jakob Stadium, Basel
20:00	Odermatt (yellow card) 19'; Hitzfeld (yellow card) 30'; Hitzfeld 90+1' (pen. 1:0)	FCB summary FCZ summary	(yellow card) 20' Zigerlig; (yellow card) 89' Botteron	Attendance: 18,000; Referee: (Switzerland) André Favre Echallens
Note: In the 86th minute Bottles were thrown after a goal by Eigil Nielsen was disallowed for offside. FCZ lodged an official (and hopeless) protest.

12 October 1974 Round 9	Young Boys	4–4	Basel	Wankdorf Stadium, Bern
20:15	Cornioley 7' (1:0); Muhmenthaler 31' (2:2); Muhmenthaler 34' (3:2); Andersen 68' (4:4)	Summary	9' (1:1) Nielsen; 30' (1:2) Nielsen; 35' (3:3) Hitzfeld; 45' (o.g. 3:4) Schmocker; (yellow card) Hasler	Attendance: 11,500; Referee: (Switzerland) Walter Hungerbühler St. Gallen

19 October 1974 Round 10	Basel	3–0	Vevey-Sports	St. Jakob Stadium, Basel
20:00	Ramseier 72' (1:0); Schönenberger 73' (2:0); Demarmels 84' (3:0)	Summary	(yellow card) Tippelt	Attendance: 5,000; Referee: (Switzerland) André Longaretti Neuchâtel

26 October 1974 Round 11	St. Gallen	2–0	Basel	Espenmoos, St. Gallen
17:30	Schneeberger 57' (1:0); Seger (yellow card) 69'; Labhart 89' (2:0)	Summary	(yellow card) 62' Mundschin; (yellow card) 64' Fischli	Attendance: 4,700; Referee: (Switzerland) Ernest Guignet Yverdon

10 November 1974 Round 12	Lugano	2–0	Basel	Cornaredo, Lugano
14:30	Brenna 29' (pen. 1:0); Bressan (yellow card) 44'; Brenna 50' (2:0)	Summary		Attendance: 6,000; Referee: (Switzerland) Otto Isler Zürich

17 November 1974 Round 13	Basel	2–0	Chiasso	St. Jakob Stadium, Basel
14:30	Schönenberger 4' (1:0); Demarmels (yellow card) 34'; Hitzfeld 55' (pen. 2:0)	Summary	(yellow card) 18' Mustapha; (yellow card) 55' Bizzini	Attendance: 5,500; Referee: (Switzerland) Roland Racine Prilly

24 November 1974 Round 7	Servette	2–1	Basel	Charmilles Stadium, Geneva
14:45	Pfister 3' (1:0); Pfister 52'	Summary	(yellow card) 1' Ramseier; 27' (1:1) Tanner; (yellow card) 86' Fischli	Attendance: 9,000; Referee: (Switzerland) Anton Bucheli Luzern

16 March 1974 Round 14	Xamax	2–2	Basel	Stade de la Maladière (1924), Neuchâtel
14:30	Guillaume 58' (1:2); Mathez 63' (2:2); Müller (yellow card) 86'	Summary	22' (0:1) Balmer; (yellow card) 35' Odermatt; 57' (0:2) Hitzfeld	Attendance: 6,200; Referee: (Switzerland) Walter Hungerbühler St. Gallen

23 March 1975 Round 15	Basel	3–2	Lausanne-Sport	St. Jakob Stadium, Basel
14:30	Hitzfeld 25' (1:1); Balmer 30' (2:1); Mundschin 79' (3:2)	Summary	23' (0:1) Zappella; 41' (2:2) Traber; (yellow card) 90' Loichat	Attendance: 8,000; Referee: (Switzerland) René Matthieu

5 April 1975 Round 16	Winterthur	2–0	Basel	Schützenwiese, Winterthur
16:30	Künzli 5' (1:0); Fischbach 44' (2:0)	Summary	(yellow card) 10' Odermatt	Attendance: 7,000; Referee: (Switzerland) René Matthieu

13 April 1972 Round 17	Basel	2–3	Sion	St. Jakob Stadium, Basel
20:00	Hitzfeld 9' (1:0); Balmer 34' (2:1)	Summary	21' (1:1) Cucinotta; 58' (2:2) Barberis; 80' (2:3) Cucinotta	Attendance: 5,500; Referee: (Switzerland) Jean Dubach (Nidau)

16 April 1972 Round 18	Basel	0–1	Grasshopper Club	St. Jakob Stadium, Basel
20:00	Fischli (yellow card) 89'	Summary	(yellow card) 81' Becker; 88' (0:1) Santrac	Attendance: 7,500; Referee: (Switzerland) Ernest Guignet (Yverdon)

20 April 1975 Round 19	Luzern	1–2	Basel	Stadion Allmend, Luzern
15:00	Schaller 52' (1:1); Coray (yellow card) 80'	Summary	(yellow card) 3' Ramseier; 33' (0:1) Ramseier; 55' (1:2) Odermatt	Attendance: 6,500; Referee: (Switzerland) André Favre (Echallens=

26 April 1975 Round 20	Basel	1–0	Servette	St. Jakob Stadium, Basel
20:00	Hitzfeld 20' (1:0)	Summary	(yellow card) Guyot	Attendance: 7,000; Referee: (Switzerland) Roland Racine (Prilly)

3 May 1975 Round 21	Zürich	1–2	Basel	Letzigrund, Zürich
17:00	Martinelli 62' (1:1); Rutschmann (penalty missed) 90′	FCB summary FCZ summary	(yellow card) 24' Nielsen; 47' (0:1) Mundschin; 70' (1:2) Ramseier	Attendance: 10,000; Referee: (Switzerland) Bruno Della Bruna (Lumino)
Note: Corners 12:5

17 May 1975 Round 22	Basel	0–0	Young Boys	St. Jakob Stadium, Basel
20:00	Schönenberger (yellow card) 55'	Summary	(yellow card) 85' Schild	Attendance: 11,000; Referee: (Switzerland) Otto Wyniger (Wetzikon)

24 May 1975 Round 23	Vevey-Sports	1–2	Basel	Stade de Copet, Vevey
20:15	Grobet 63' (1:2)	Summary	1' (0:1) Odermatt; 62' (0:2) Tanner	Attendance: 3,000; Referee: (Switzerland) Willy Utz (/)Oensingen

31 May 1975 Round 24	Basel	8–2	St. Gallen	St. Jakob Stadium, Basel
20:00	Mundschin 12' (1:0); Schönenberger 18' (2:0); Schönenberger 32' (3:1); Tanner 43' (4:1); Odermatt 48' (5:1); Odermatt 54' (6:2); Hasler 56' (7:2); Mundschin 58' (8:2)	Summary	24' (2:1) Blättler; 52' (5:2) Nasdalla	Attendance: 3,000; Referee: (Switzerland) Gottlieb Barmettler (Luzern)

7 June 1975 Round 25	Basel	2–2	Lugano	St. Jakob Stadium, Basel
20:15	Schönenberger 41' (1:0); Schönenberger 54' (2:1)	Summary	(yellow card) 36' Arigoni; 55' (1:1) Conigliaro; 82' (2:2) Gröbli	Attendance: 7,500; Referee: (Switzerland) Otto Isler (Zürich)

14 June 1975 Round 26	Chênois	1–1	Basel	Stade des Trois-Chêne, Thônex
20:15	Bizzini 85' (1:1)	Summary	(yellow card) 70' Mundschin; 77' (0:1) Wirth; (yellow card) 82' Demarmels	Attendance: 2,000; Referee: (Switzerland) A. Häring (Düdingen)

==== Final league table ====
Pos	Team	Pld	W	D	L	GF	GA	GD	Pts	Qualification
1	Zürich	26	19	1	6	63	19	+44	39	Swiss Champions, qualified for 1975–76 European Cup and entered 1975 Intertoto Cup
2	Young Boys	26	12	9	5	59	32	+27	33	Qualified for 1975–76 UEFA Cup and entered 1975 Intertoto Cup
3	Grasshopper Club	26	13	7	6	50	45	+5	33	Qualified for 1975–76 UEFA Cup and entered 1975 Intertoto Cup
4	Basel	26	11	9	6	49	33	+16	31	Swiss Cup winners, qualified for 1975–76 Cup Winners' Cup
5	FC Sion	26	12	7	7	45	30	+15	31	
6	Lausanne-Sport	26	10	9	7	40	35	+5	29	
7	Servette	26	10	7	9	43	35	+8	27	
8	Winterthur	26	9	8	9	36	31	+5	26	
9	Xamax	26	9	6	11	47	47	0	24	Entered 1975 Intertoto Cup
10	Lugano	26	8	6	12	34	40	−6	22	
11	Chênois	26	6	8	12	27	55	−28	20	
12	St. Gallen	26	6	8	12	42	72	−30	20	
13	Luzern	26	5	6	15	33	58	−25	16	Relegated to 1975–76 Nationalliga B
14	Vevey-Sports	26	3	7	16	31	67	−36	13	Relegated to 1975–76 Nationalliga B

Source: rsssf.com
Rules for classification: 1) Points; 2) Goal difference within the league, however with play-off for qualifiers;

=== Swiss Cup ===
21 September 1974 Round 4	Chiasso	0–1	Basel	Stadio Comunale, Chiasso
20:30	Sulmoni (yellow card) 35'	Summary	25' (0:1) Odermatt; (yellow card) 65' Tanner	Attendance: 3,600; Referee: (Switzerland) Rudolf Renggli Luzern

16 Obtober 1974 Round 5	Zürich	1–3	Basel	Letzigrund, Zürich
20:15	Martinelli 6' (1:0); Zigerlig (yellow card) 18'; Bionda (yellow card) 61'; Heer (yellow card) 81'	FCZ summary FCB summary	12' (1:1) Hitzfeld; (yellow card) 16' Hasler; (yellow card) 26' Fischli; (yellow card) 40' Odermatt; 52' (1:2) Ramseier; 62' (1:3) Hitzfeld	Attendance: 13,500; Referee: (Switzerland) Bruno Della Bruna (Lumino)
Note: 76' goal from Hitzfeld not given do to off-side.

30 October 1974 Quarter-final; First leg	Étoile Carouge	1–2	Basel	Stade de la Fontenette, Carouge
20:15	Manai 8' (1:0); Fatton (yellow card) 78'; Manai (yellow card) 82'	Summary	19' (1:1) Balmer; (yellow card) 26' Balmer; (yellow card) 58' Ramseier; 80' (pen. 1:2) Hitzfeld	Attendance: 3,600; Referee: (Switzerland) Gérard Racine (Biel/Bienne)

3 November 1974 Quarter-final; Second leg	Basel	2–1 (4–2 agg.)	Étoile Carouge	St. Jakob Stadium, Basel
14:30	Hitzfeld 19' (1:0); Mundschin 42' (2:0)	Summary	78' (o.g. 2:1) Ramseier	Attendance: 5,000; Referee: (Switzerland) Pierre Despont (Lausanne)

9 March 1975 Semi-final; First leg	Chênois	1–4	Basel	Stade des Trois-Chêne, Thônex
15:00	Marietan (yellow card) 28'; Mundschin 79' (o.g. 1:1)	Summary	2' (0:1) Hitzfeld; (yellow card) 25' Fischli; 80' (1:2) Hitzfeld; 82' (1:3) Stohler; 87' (1:4) Demarmels	Attendance: 2,200; Referee: (Switzerland) Ulysse Darbellay Roche

11 March 1975 Semi-final; Second leg	Basel	2–1 (6–2 agg.)	Chênois	St. Jakob Stadium, Basel
20:00	Rahmen 64' (1:0); Hitzfeld (yellow card) 65'; Hitzfeld 83' (2:0)	Summary	(yellow card) 70' Clivaz; 90' (2:1) Bizzini	Attendance: 5,800; Referee: (Switzerland) Bruno Della Bruna Lumino

31 March 1975 Final	Basel	2–1 (a.e.t.)	Winterthur	Wankdorf Stadium, Bern
14:30	Demarmels 48'; Walter Balmer 115'	Summary	66' E. Meyer	Attendance: 28,000; Referee: (Switzerland) Gérard Racine Biel/Bienne

=== Swiss League Cup ===
3 August 1974 Round 1	Young Boys	2–4	Basel	Wankdorf Stadium, Bern
20:15	Leuzinger 24' (1:0); Bruttin (yellow card) 35'; Bruttin 42' (2:1)	Summary	35' (1:1) Nielsen; 47' (2:2) Balmer; Schönebeck 87' (2:3); Wirth 90' (2:4)	Attendance: 9,000; Referee: (Switzerland) Otto Isler Zürich

7 August 1974 Round 2	Basel	5–2	Luzern	St. Jakob Stadium, Basel
20:00	Wirth 9' (1:0); Tanner 17' (2:0); Tanner 19' (2:0); Ramseier 65' (4:0) von Wartburg 69' (5:1); Tanner (yellow card) 78'	Summary	68' (4:1) Küttel; 79' (5:2) Schaller	Attendance: 5,500; Referee: (Switzerland) Mario Osta Oberuzwil

13 August 1974 Quarter-final	Basel	4–2 (a.e.t.)	Aarau	St. Jakob Stadium, Basel
20:00	Hitzfeld 86' (1:1); Schönenberger 94' (2:1); Schönenberger 98' (3:2); Ramseier 119' (4:2)	Summary	27' (0:1) Ponte; 96' (2:2) Caduff	Attendance: 4,000; Referee: (Switzerland) Walter Gallmann Oberrieden

25 September 1974 Semi-final	Basel	1–3	Grasshopper Club	St. Jakob Stadium, Basel
20:00	Mundschin 29' (1:2)	Summary	25' (0:1) Elsener; 27' (0:2) Noventa; 87' (1:3) Ohlhauser	Attendance: 5,800; Referee: (Switzerland) Ernest Guignet Yverdon

=== Cup of the Alps ===
==== Group B results ====
13 July 1974 round 1	Basel (Switzerland)	1–1	(France) Olympique Lyonnais	St. Jakob Stadium Basel
20:00	Wirth 54' (1:1)	Summary	41' (0:1) Maneiro	Attendance: 2,200; Referee: (France) Robert Helies

20 July 1974 round 2	Nîmes Olympique (France)	2–4	(Switzerland) Basel	Stade Jean-Bouin, Nîmes
	Piermayer 36' (1:2); Dellamore 80' (2:3)	Summary	14' (0:1) Nielsen; 22' (0:2) Hitzfeld; 64' (1:3) Nielsen; 82' (2:4) Nielsen	Attendance: 1,600; Referee: (Switzerland) Jean Dubach Nidau

23 July 1974 round 3	Olympique Lyonnais (France)	1–3	(Switzerland) Basel	Lyon
20:30	Lacombe 7' (1:0)	Summary	8' (1:1) Stohler; 13' (1:2) Balmer; 64' (1:3) Schönenberger	Attendance: 2,200; Referee: (Switzerland) André Longaretti Neuchâtel

27 July 1974 round 4	Basel (Switzerland)	1–2	(France) Nîmes Olympique	St. Jakob Stadium Basel
20:00	Nielsen 74' (1:2)	Summary	35' (0:1) Girard; 64' (0:2) Dellamore	Attendance: 3,400; Referee: (France) Roger Machin

NB: teams did not play compatriots

==== Group table ====
Pos	Team	Pld	W	D	L	GF	GA	GD	Pts	
1	Basel	4	2	1	1	9	6	+3	5 (Note: 1 bonus point would have been awarded for a victory by 3 or more goals)	Advance to final
2	Olympique Lyonnais	4	2	1	1	7	7	0	5	
3	Lausanne-Sport	4	1	1	2	7	8	−1	3	
4	Nîmes Olympique	4	1	1	2	7	9	−2	3	

Source: rsssf.com

==== Cup final ====
30 July 1974 Final	Basel (Switzerland)	1–2	(Switzerland) Young Boys	St. Jakob Stadium, Basel
20:00	Stohler 37' (1:0)	Summary	78' (1:1) Conz; 83' (1:2) Schild	Attendance: 5,700; Referee: (Switzerland) André Favre Echallens

== See also ==
- History of FC Basel
- List of FC Basel players
- List of FC Basel seasons

== Sources and references ==
- Rotblau: Jahrbuch Saison 2015/2016. Publisher: FC Basel Marketing AG. ISBN 978-3-7245-2050-4
- Die ersten 125 Jahre. Publisher: Josef Zindel im Friedrich Reinhardt Verlag, Basel. ISBN 978-3-7245-2305-5
- Switzerland 1974–75 at RSSSF
- Swiss League Cup at RSSSF
- Cup of the Alps 1974 at RSSSF
