= Buseno =

- Municipality
- Flag Coat of arms
- Location of Buseno
- Location within Switzerland Location within Canton of Grisons
- Coordinates: 46°16′N 9°6′E
- Country: Switzerland
- Canton: Grisons
- District: Moesa

Area
  - Total: 11.26 km^{2} (4.35 sq mi)
- Elevation: 801 m (2,628 ft)

Population (December 2015)
  - Total: 92
  - Density: 8.2/km^{2} (21/sq mi)
- Time zone: UTC+01:00 (CET)
  - Summer (DST): UTC+02:00 (CEST)
- Postal code: 6542
- SFOS number: 3804
- ISO 3166 code: CH-GR
- Surrounded by: Arvigo, Braggio, Castaneda, Roveredo, Santa Maria in Calanca, San Vittore
- Website: buseno.moesano.ch

Buseno is a municipality in the Moesa Region in the Swiss canton of the Grisons.

== History ==
Buseno first became an independent municipality in 1851 when it separated from the former municipality of Calanca. The parish church of SS. Pietro e Antonio was consecrated in 1483. In 1776 it was expanded and in 1990 restored. The modern church of Nostra Signora di Fatima in Giova was built in 1984-88.

== Geography ==
Aerial view (1953)

Buseno has an area, as of 2006, of 11.2 km^{2} (4.3 sq mi). Of this area, 5.6% is used for agricultural purposes, while 82.2% is forested. Of the rest of the land, 1.9% is settled (buildings or roads) and the remainder (10.3%) is non-productive (rivers, glaciers or mountains).

Until 2017, the municipality was located in the Calanca sub-district of the Moesa district, after 2017 it was part of the Moesa Region. The village of Buseno is located on a terrasse on the right bank of the Calancasca. Below Buseno there is the village section of Molina and above are the alpine settlements of San Carlo (Maiensäss) and Giova. Giova originally belonged to the municipality of San Vittore and joined Buseno in 1899. Until 1943 Buseno was known as Busen.

== Demographics ==
Buseno has a population (as of 31 December 2020) of 91. As of 2008, 7.3% of the population was made up of foreign nationals. Over the last 10 years the population has decreased at a rate of -5.2%. Most of the population (as of 2000) speaks Italian (88.2%), with German being second most common ( 8.2%) and Portuguese being third ( 1.8%).

As of 2000, the gender distribution of the population was 45.9% male and 54.1% female. The age distribution, as of 2000, in Buseno is; 10 children or 9.1% of the population are between 0 and 9 years old. 5 teenagers or 4.5% are 10 to 14, and 3 teenagers or 2.7% are 15 to 19. Of the adult population, 6 people or 5.5% of the population are between 20 and 29 years old. 17 people or 15.5% are 30 to 39, 9 people or 8.2% are 40 to 49, and 10 people or 9.1% are 50 to 59. The senior population distribution is 21 people or 19.1% of the population are between 60 and 69 years old, 19 people or 17.3% are 70 to 79, there are 9 people or 8.2% who are 80 to 89, and there are 1 people or 0.9% who are 90 to 99.

In the 2007 federal election the most popular party was the CVP which received 61.1% of the vote. The next three most popular parties were the SVP (20.4%), the FDP (13.7%) and the SP (4.9%).

In Buseno about 50% of the population (between age 25-64) have completed either non-mandatory upper secondary education or additional higher education (either University or a Fachhochschule).

Buseno has an unemployment rate of 1.96%. As of 2005, there were 28 people employed in the primary economic sector and about 10 businesses involved in this sector. 14 people are employed in the tertiary sector, with 4 businesses in this sector.

The historical population is given in the following table:

Year	Population
1611	575
1803	344
1850	248
1900	198
1950	241
1990	97
2000	110
