= Castaneda, Switzerland =

Castaneda
- Municipality
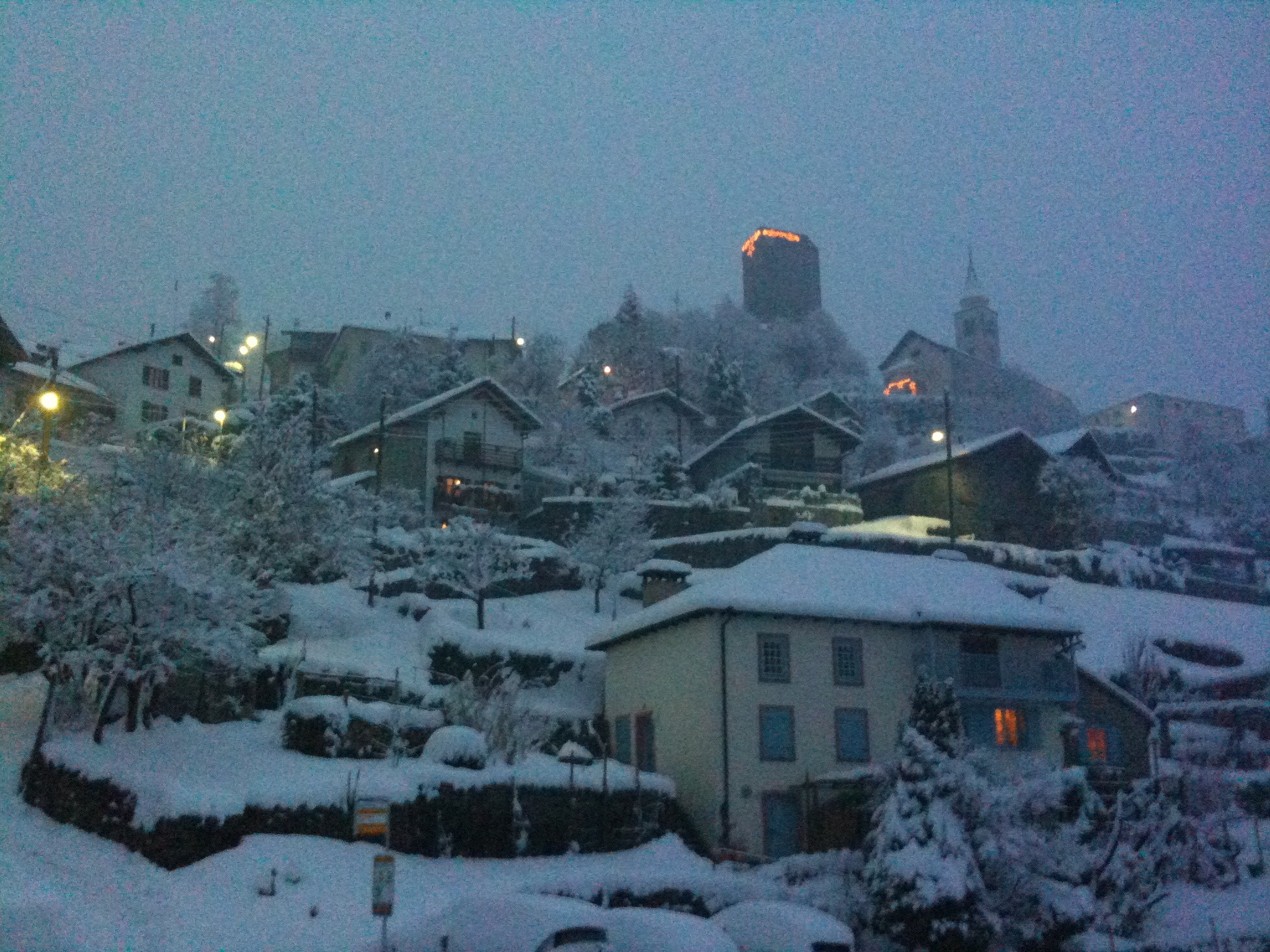

- Flag Coat of arms
- Location of Castaneda
- Location within Switzerland Location within Canton of Grisons
- Coordinates: 46°15′N 9°8′E
- Country: Switzerland
- Canton: Grisons
- District: Moesa

Area
  - Total: 3.94 km^{2} (1.52 sq mi)
- Elevation: 750 m (2,460 ft)

Population (December 2020)
  - Total: 278
  - Density: 70.6/km^{2} (183/sq mi)
- Time zone: UTC+01:00 (CET)
  - Summer (DST): UTC+02:00 (CEST)
- Postal code: 6540
- SFOS number: 3805
- ISO 3166 code: CH-GR
- Surrounded by: Buseno, Grono, Roveredo, Santa Maria in Calanca, San Vittore, Verdabbio
- Website: www.castaneda.ch

Castaneda is a municipality in the Moesa Region in the Swiss canton of the Grisons.

== History ==
Castaneda is first mentioned in 1295.

In the mid 19th Century an ice age era graveyard and settlement was discovered near the village church. It was excavated in 1928, and about 100 graves were discovered. In 1978–80, in Pian del Remit, which is north-west of the church, a Stone Age settlement was discovered underneath an ice age site. The rectangular midden included post holes, fire sites, ceramic fragments and variety of sedimentary rocks and crystals. The site was dated to 2800-1500 BC and included stone and Bronze Age. A multi-stage dry stone wall in Pian del Remit can't be exactly dated but may date from the Iron Age into the modern era. Its original function (building foundation, terrace wall or marker stone) is not known.

== Geography ==
Aerial view (1953)

Castaneda has an area, as of 2006, of 3.9 km^{2} (1.5 sq mi). Of this area, 3.8% is used for agricultural purposes, while 76.6% is forested. Of the rest of the land, 4.1% is settled (buildings or roads) and the remainder (15.5%) is non-productive (rivers, glaciers or mountains).

Before 2017, the municipality was located in the Calanca sub-district of the Moesa district, after 2017 it was part of the Moesa Region. It is located at the entrance to the Val Calanca, on a terrace that is part of the Misox valley.

== Demographics ==
Castaneda has a population (as of 31 December 2020) of 278. As of 2008, 10.2% of the population was made up of foreign nationals. Over the last 10 years the population has grown at a rate of 1.4%. Most of the population (as of 2000) speaks Italian (79.6%), with German being second most common (16.7%) and French being third (1.8%).

As of 2000, the gender distribution of the population was 44.0% male and 56.0% female. The age distribution, as of 2000, in Castaneda is; 15 children or 6.8% of the population are between 0 and 9 years old. 6 teenagers or 2.7% are 10 to 14, and 7 teenagers or 3.2% are 15 to 19. Of the adult population, 28 people or 12.7% of the population are between 20 and 29 years old. 30 people or 13.6% are 30 to 39, 29 people or 13.1% are 40 to 49, and 33 people or 14.9% are 50 to 59. The senior population distribution is 29 people or 13.1% of the population are between 60 and 69 years old, 24 people or 10.9% are 70 to 79, there are 17 people or 7.7% who are 80 to 89, and there are 3 people or 1.4% who are 90 to 99.

In the 2007 federal election the most popular party was the SP which received 34.3% of the vote. The next three most popular parties were the SVP (27.5%), the FDP (21.6%) and the CVP (14.6%).

The entire Swiss population is generally well educated. In Castaneda about 70.6% of the population (between age 25–64) have completed either non-mandatory upper secondary education or additional higher education (either University or a Fachhochschule).

Castaneda has an unemployment rate of 1.9%. As of 2005, there were 3 people employed in the primary economic sector and about 2 businesses involved in this sector. 3 people are employed in the secondary sector and there are 2 businesses in this sector. 34 people are employed in the tertiary sector, with 5 businesses in this sector.

The historical population is given in the following table:

year	population
1808	129
1850	188
1860	232
1900	178
1950	182
1960	151
1970	161
1980	198
1990	193
2000	221
