= Moesa Region =

Coordinates: 46°14′N 9°07′E

Moesa Region Regione Moesa (Italian)
- District
- Country: Switzerland
- Canton: Graubünden

Area
  - Total: 473.74 km^{2} (182.91 sq mi)

Population (2020)
  - Total: 8,770
  - Density: 18.5/km^{2} (47.9/sq mi)
- Time zone: UTC+1 (CET)
  - Summer (DST): UTC+2 (CEST)
- Municipalities: 12

The Moesa Region is one of the eleven administrative districts in the Canton of the Grisons (or in German: Graubünden) in Switzerland. It had an area of 473.74 square kilometers (182.91 sq mi) and a population of 8,770 (as of 31 December 2020). It was created on 1 January 2017 as part of a reorganization of the Canton.

Municipalities in the Moesa Region
| Municipality | Population (31 December 2020) | Area (km^{2}) |
|---|---|---|
| Buseno | 91 | 11.15 |
| Castaneda | 278 | 3.96 |
| Rossa | 151 | 58.89 |
| Santa Maria in Calanca | 115 | 9.31 |
| Lostallo | 840 | 50.86 |
| Mesocco | 1,323 | 164.77 |
| Soazza | 324 | 46.42 |
| Cama | 589 | 15 |
| Grono | 1,397 | 37.12 |
| Roveredo (GR) | 2,597 | 38.79 |
| San Vittore | 864 | 22.06 |
| Calanca | 201 | 37.72 |

The region borders with the Viamala Region to the north, with Italy to the east (Lombardy: Province of Sondrio and of Como) and with the Canton of Ticino (districts of Bellinzona to the southwest, Riviera and Blenio) to the west.

== Politics ==
=== Administrative division ===
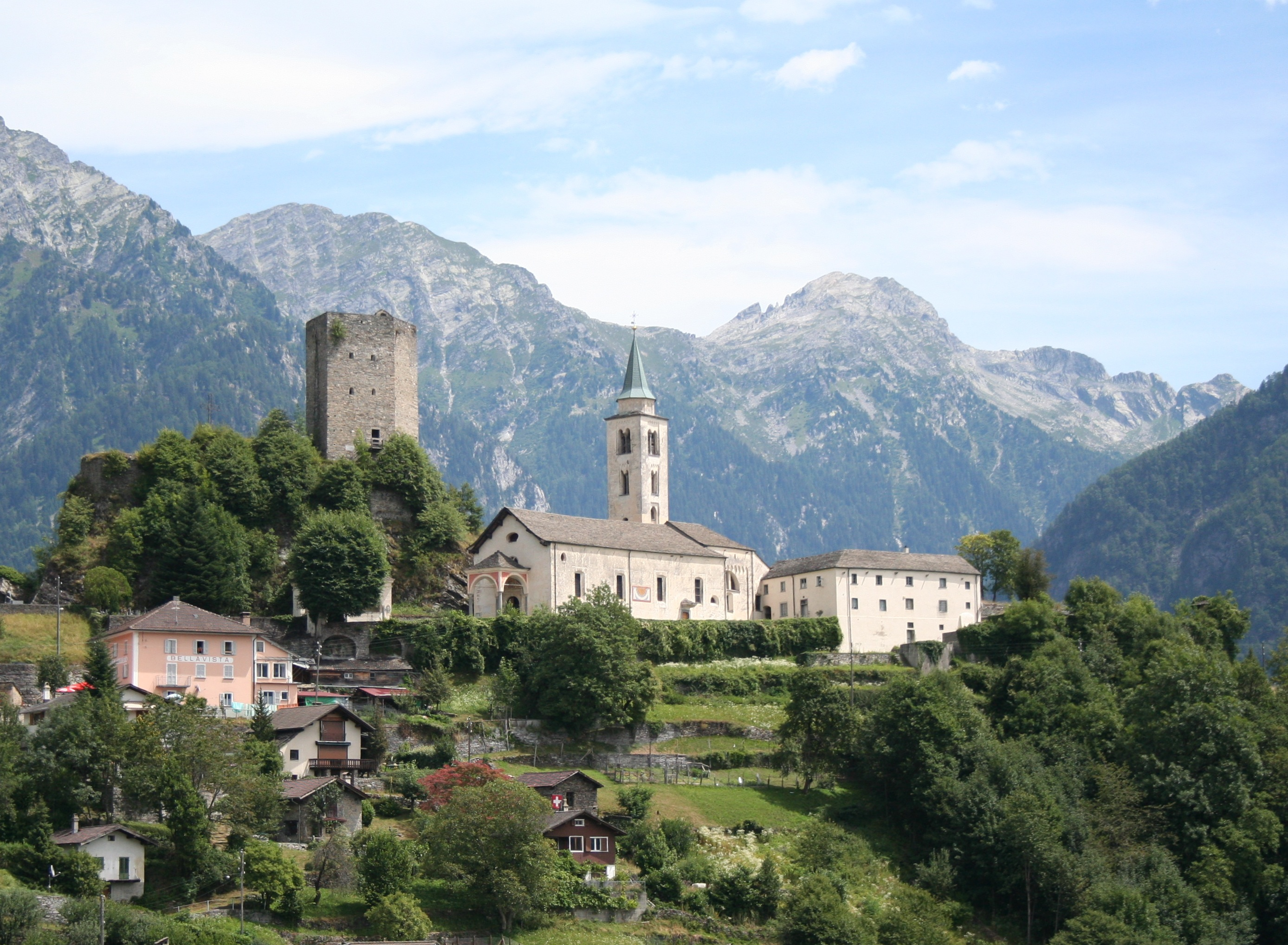
Santa Maria in Calanca

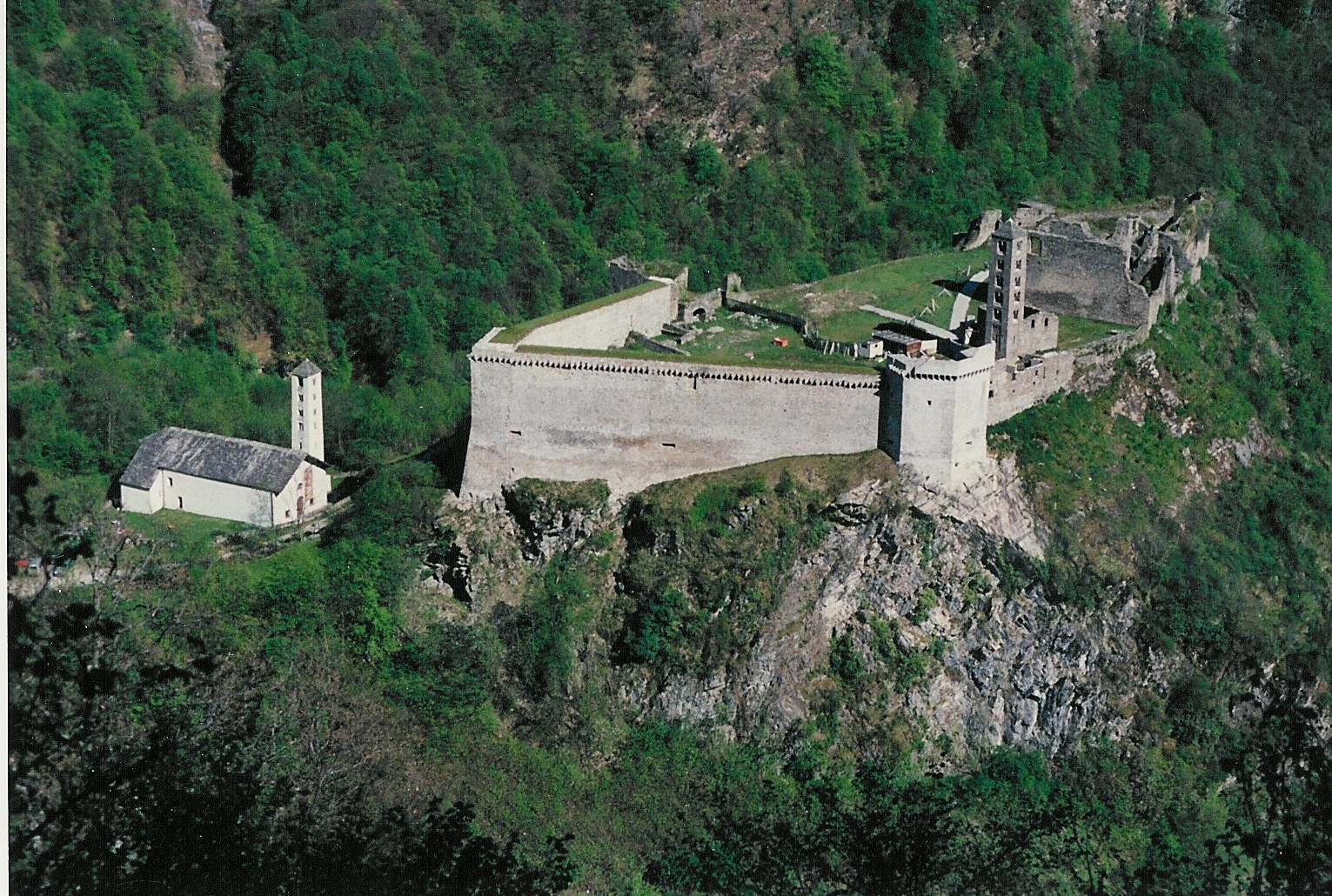
Castle of Mesocco

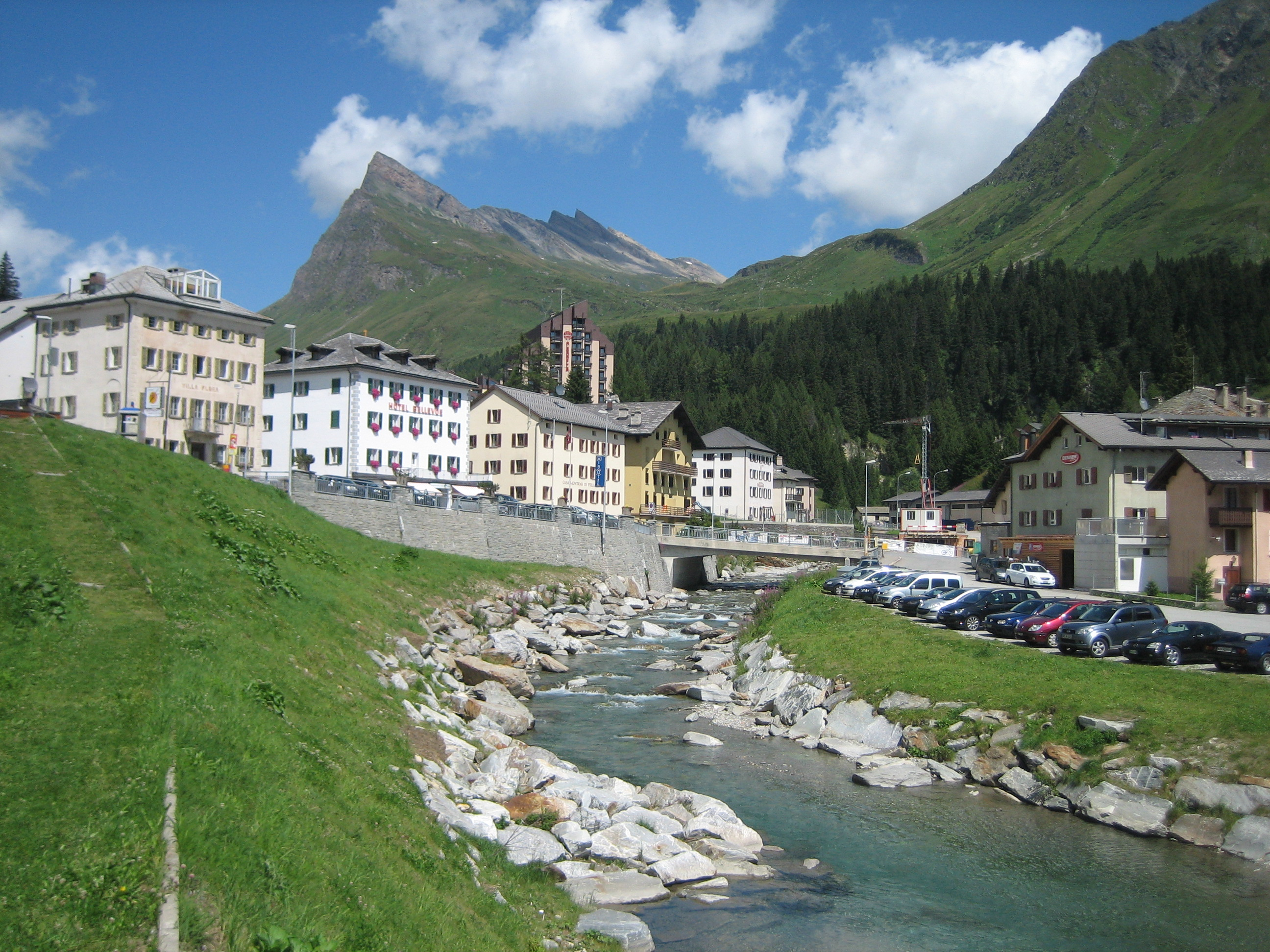
Village of San Bernardino, Mesocco

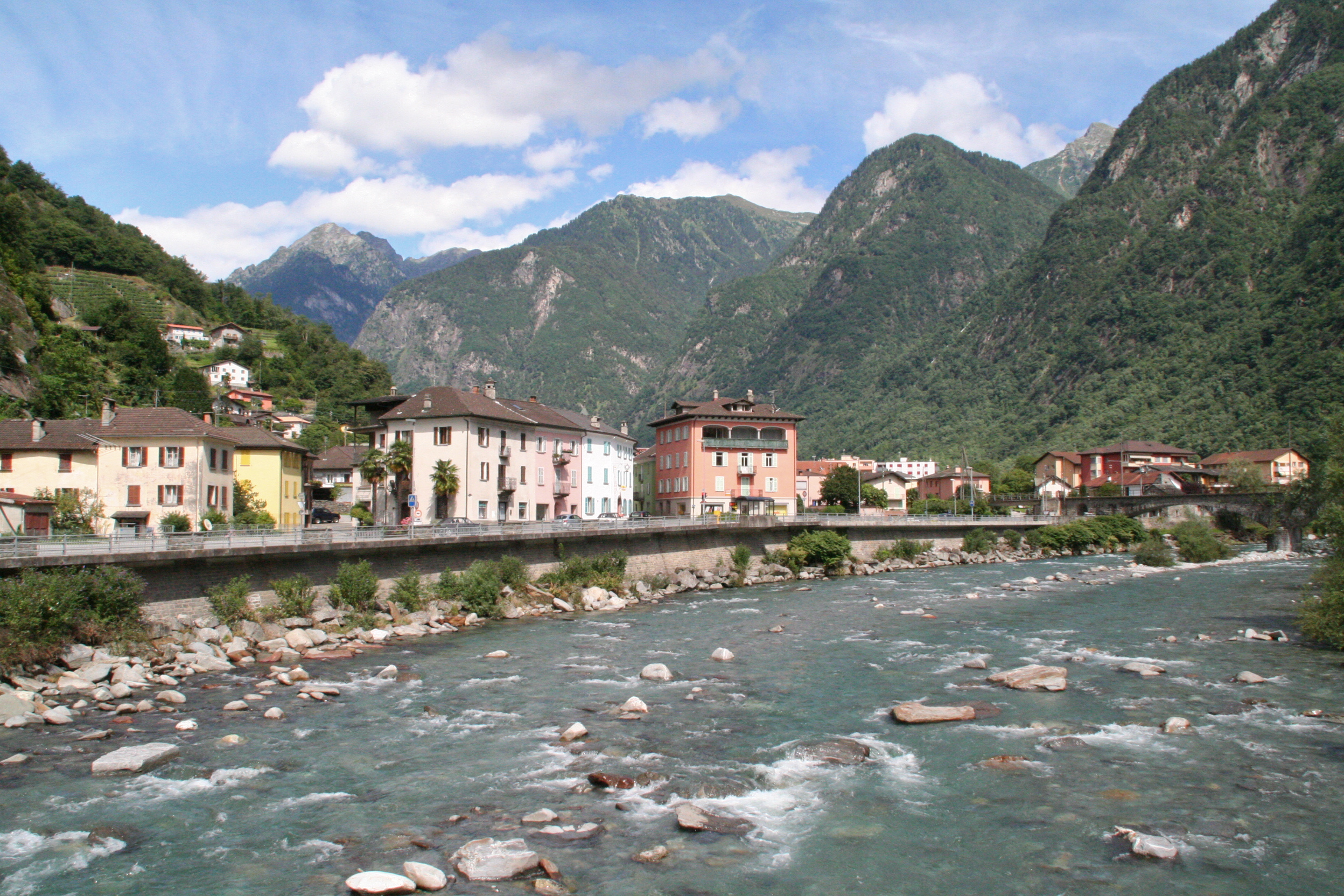
Roveredo

The Moesa region is divided into 12 municipalities:

| Emblem | Name of the municipality | Inhabitants 31 December 2,020 | Surface in km^{2} |
|---|---|---|---|
| Buseno | Buseno | 91 | 11.15 |
| Calanca | Calanca | 201 | 37.72 |
| Cama | Cama | 589 | 15.00 |
| Castaneda | Castaneda | 278 | 3.96 |
| Grono | Grono | 1340 | 36.41 |
| Lostallo | Lostallo | 840 | 50.86 |
| Mesocco | Mesocco | 1,323 | 164.76 |
| Rossa | Rossa | 151 | 58.88 |
| Roveredo | Roveredo | 2,597 | 38.79 |
| Santa Maria in Calanca | Santa Maria in Calanca | 115 | 9.31 |
| San Vittore | San Vittore | 864 | 22.06 |
| Soazza | Soazza | 324 | 46.42 |

== Demography ==
The Moesa region has about 8500 inhabitants, mostly Italian-speaking, and is part of Italian-speaking Graubünden and Italian-speaking Switzerland. It is linked economically to the Canton of Ticino; linguistically, however, a Lombard Alpine dialect is spoken that is heavily influenced by Germanic terms.
