= Roveredo =

- Municipality
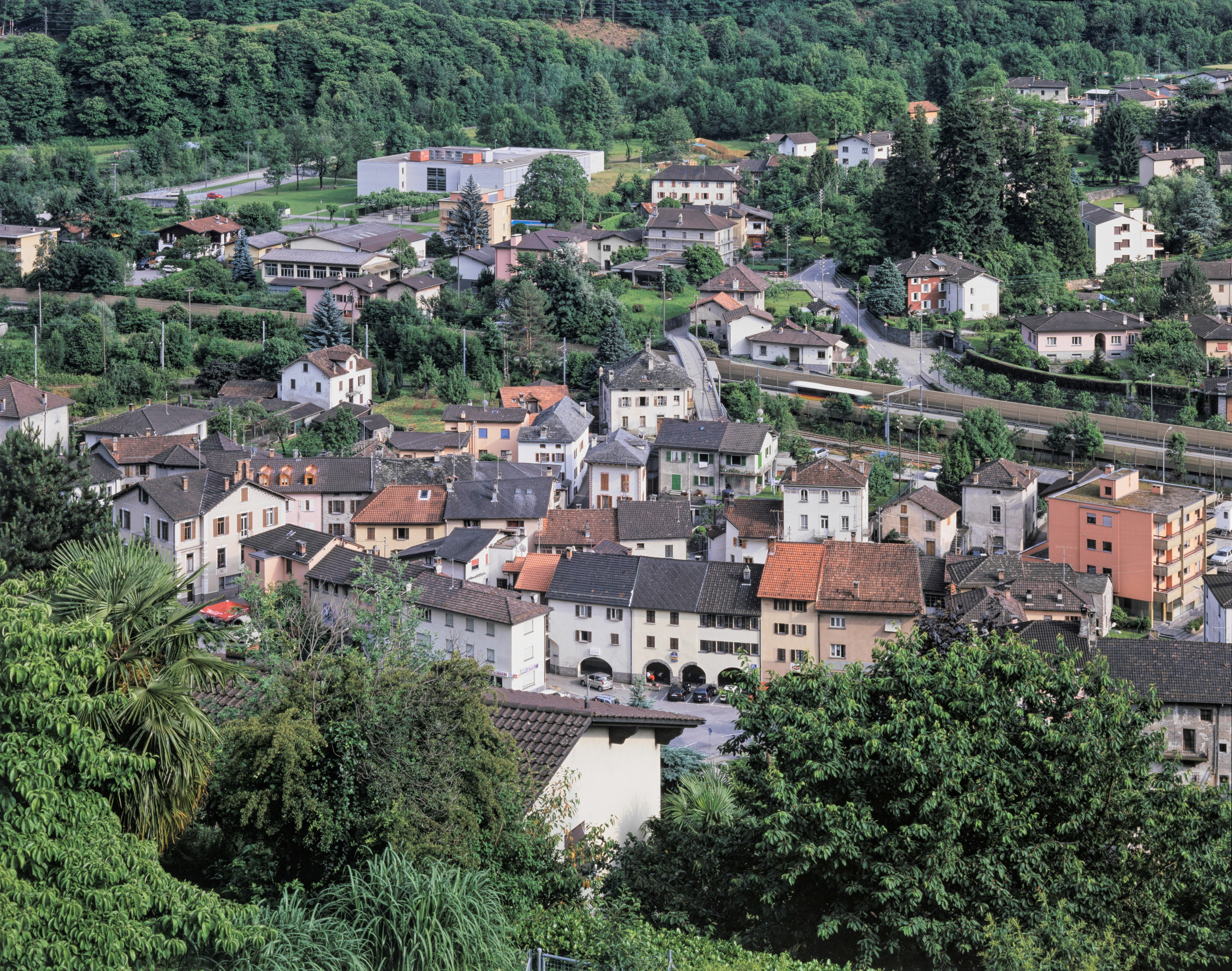

- Flag Coat of arms
- Location of Roveredo
- Location within Switzerland Location within Canton of Grisons
- Coordinates: 46°14′N 9°07′E
- Country: Switzerland
- Canton: Grisons
- District: Moesa

Area
  - Total: 38.78 km^{2} (14.97 sq mi)
- Elevation: 298 m (978 ft)

Population (December 2020)
  - Total: 2,597
  - Density: 66.97/km^{2} (173.4/sq mi)
- Time zone: UTC+01:00 (CET)
  - Summer (DST): UTC+02:00 (CEST)
- Postal code: 6535
- SFOS number: 3834
- ISO 3166 code: CH-GR
- Surrounded by: Arbedo-Castione (TI), Buseno, Castaneda, Consiglio di Rumo (IT-CO), Dosso del Liro (IT-CO), Germasino (IT-CO), Grono, Lumino (TI), Sant'Antonio (TI), San Vittore
- Website: www.roveredo.ch

Roveredo is a municipality in the Moesa Region in the canton of the Grisons in Switzerland.

== Geography ==
Aerial view (1964)

Roveredo has an area, as of 2006, of 38.8 km^{2} (15.0 sq mi). Of this area, 8.6% is used for agricultural purposes, while 75% is forested. Of the rest of the land, 3.1% is settled (buildings or roads) and the remainder (13.4%) is non-productive (rivers, glaciers or mountains).

Before 2017, the municipality was located in the Roveredo sub-district of the Moesa district on the right bank of the Moesa river, after 2017 it was in the Moesa Region.

== Demographics ==
Roveredo has a population (as of 31 December 2020) of 2,597. As of 2008, 16.8% of the population was made up of foreign nationals. Over the last 10 years the population has grown at a rate of 6.4%. Most of the population (as of 2000) speaks Italian (93.0%), with German being second most common ( 3.2%) and French being third ( 0.7%).

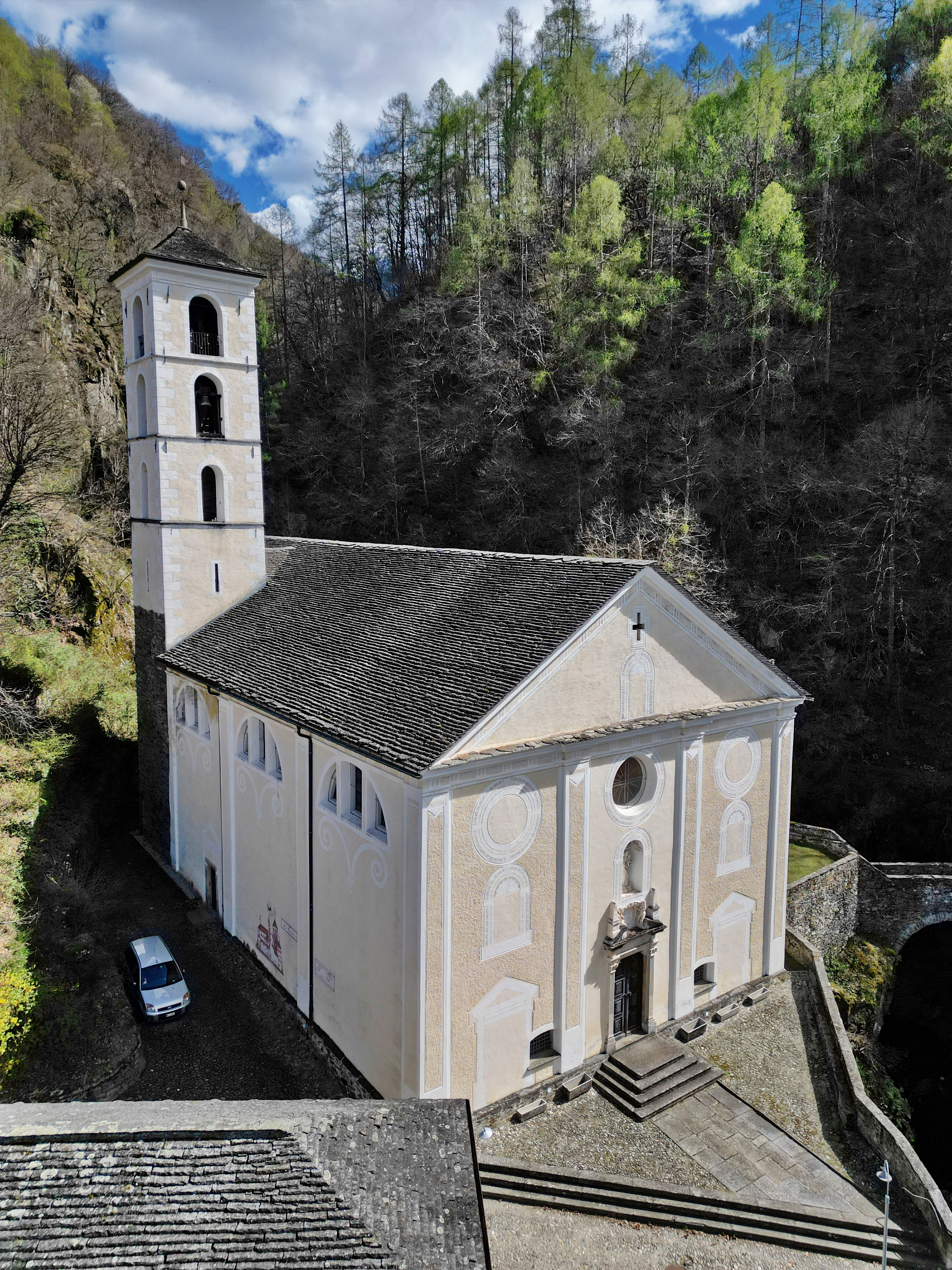
Roveredo - Church of Madonna al ponte chiuso

As of 2000, the gender distribution of the population was 49.8% male and 50.2% female. The age distribution, as of 2000, in Roveredo is; 212 children or 10.1% of the population are between 0 and 9 years old. 101 teenagers or 4.8% are 10 to 14, and 88 teenagers or 4.2% are 15 to 19. Of the adult population, 254 people or 12.0% of the population are between 20 and 29 years old. 352 people or 16.7% are 30 to 39, 291 people or 13.8% are 40 to 49, and 299 people or 14.2% are 50 to 59. The senior population distribution is 243 people or 11.5% of the population are between 60 and 69 years old, 150 people or 7.1% are 70 to 79, there are 85 people or 4.0% who are 80 to 89, and there are 33 people or 1.6% who are 90 to 99. In the 2007 federal election the most popular party was the SP which received 32.5% of the vote. The next three most popular parties were the SVP (27.7%), the CVP (21.7%) and the FDP (17.1%).

In Roveredo about 62.9% of the population (between age 25-64) have completed either non-mandatory upper secondary education or additional higher education (either university or a Fachhochschule).

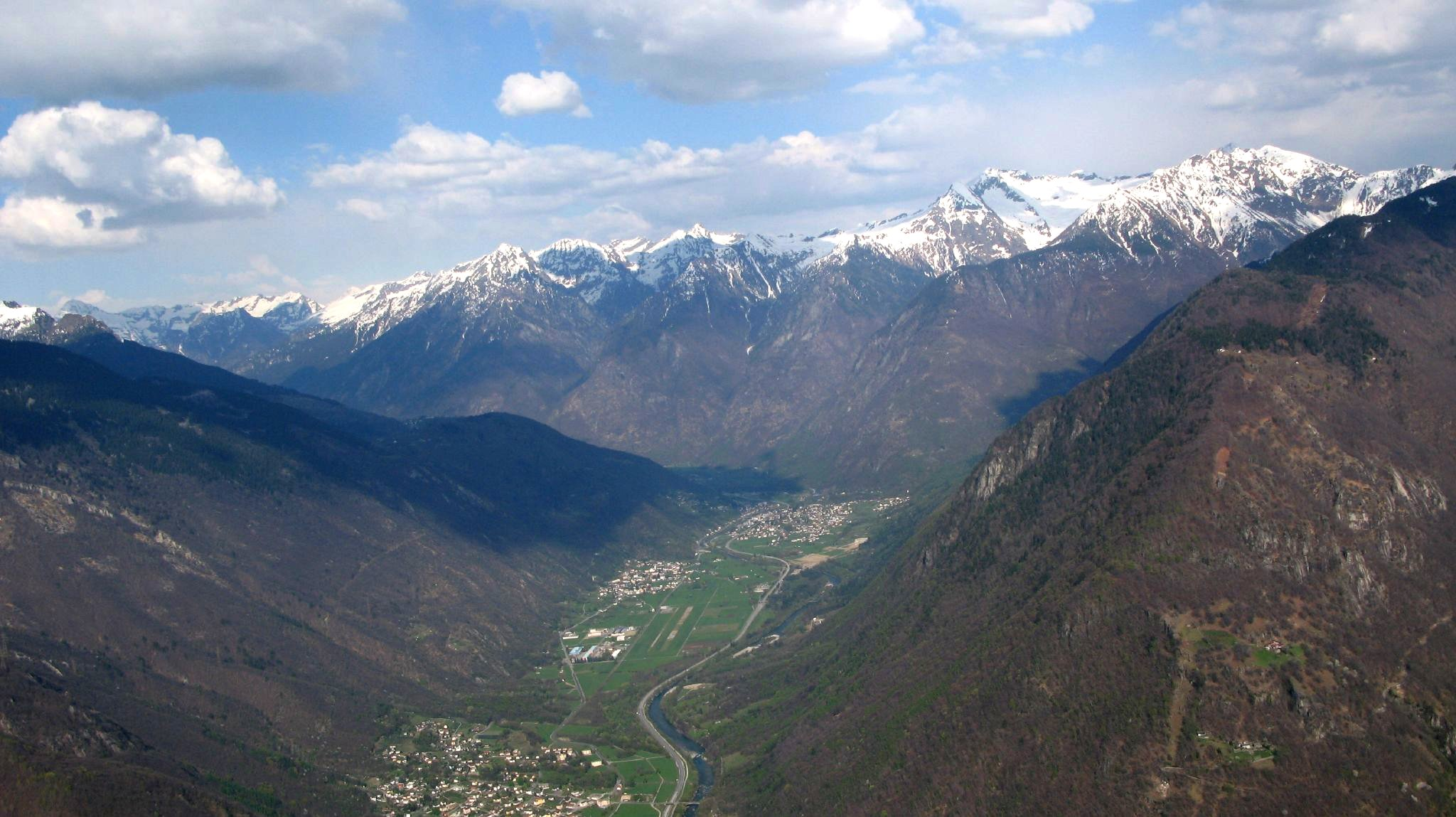
Roveredo, San Vittore and Lumino.

Roveredo has an unemployment rate of 2.85%. As of 2005, there were 43 people employed in the primary economic sector and about 20 businesses involved in this sector. 82 people are employed in the secondary sector and there are 17 businesses in this sector. 371 people are employed in the tertiary sector, with 96 businesses in this sector.

From the 2000 census, 1,829 or 86.8% are Roman Catholic, while 58 or 2.8% belonged to the Swiss Reformed Church. Of the rest of the population, there are less than 5 individuals who belong to the Christian Catholic faith, there are 15 individuals (or about 0.71% of the population) who belong to the Orthodox Church, and there are 13 individuals (or about 0.62% of the population) who belong to another Christian church. There are 55 (or about 2.61% of the population) who are Islamic. There are 12 individuals (or about 0.57% of the population) who belong to another church (not listed on the census), 82 (or about 3.89% of the population) belong to no church, are agnostic or atheist, and 44 individuals (or about 2.09% of the population) did not answer the question. The historical population is given in the following table:

year	population
1850	1,084
1880	1,021
1900	1,136
1950	1,846
1960	1,878
1970	2,037
1980	1,997
1990	2,010
2000	2,108

== Heritage sites of national significance ==
The Church of the Madonna del Ponte chiuso is listed as a Swiss heritage site of national significance.

== Notable residents ==
- Lorenzo Sciasca (1643–1694), Baroque architect and builder
- Antonio Riva (1650–1713), Baroque architect and builder
- Gabriel de Gabrieli (1671–1747), Baroque architect
- Giovanni Simonetti (1652–1716), Baroque builder and plasterer
- Giulio Simonetti (1659–1729), Baroque architect and builder
- Kaspar Zuccalli (about 1629–1678), Baroque builder
- Enrico Zuccalli (perhaps Johann Heinrich Zuccalli, 1642–1724), Baroque builder
- Giovanni Gaspare Zuccalli (about 1667–1717), Baroque builder
