= San Vittore, Switzerland =

San Vittore
- Municipality
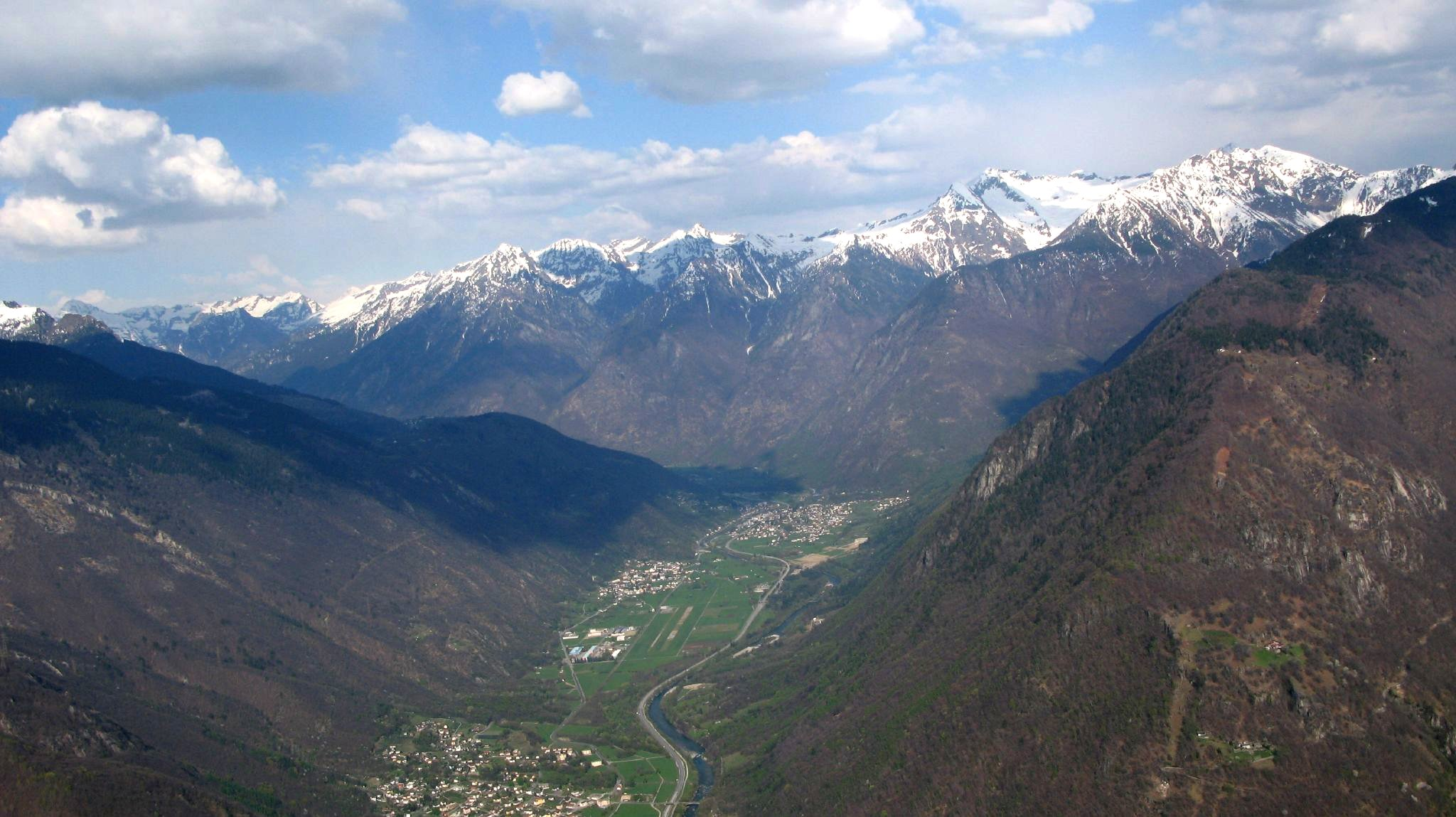

- Flag Coat of arms
- Location of San Vittore
- Location within Switzerland Location within Canton of Grisons
- Coordinates: 46°14′N 9°06′E
- Country: Switzerland
- Canton: Grisons
- District: Moesa

Area
  - Total: 22.03 km^{2} (8.51 sq mi)
- Elevation: 278 m (912 ft)

Population (December 2020)
  - Total: 864
  - Density: 39.2/km^{2} (102/sq mi)
- Time zone: UTC+01:00 (CET)
  - Summer (DST): UTC+02:00 (CEST)
- Postal code: 6534
- SFOS number: 3835
- ISO 3166 code: CH-GR
- Surrounded by: Arvigo, Buseno, Castaneda, Claro (TI), Cresciano (TI), Germasino (IT-CO), Lumino (TI), Roveredo
- Website: sanvittore.moesano.ch

San Vittore is a municipality in the Moesa Region in the Swiss canton of Grisons (Graubünden).

== Geography ==
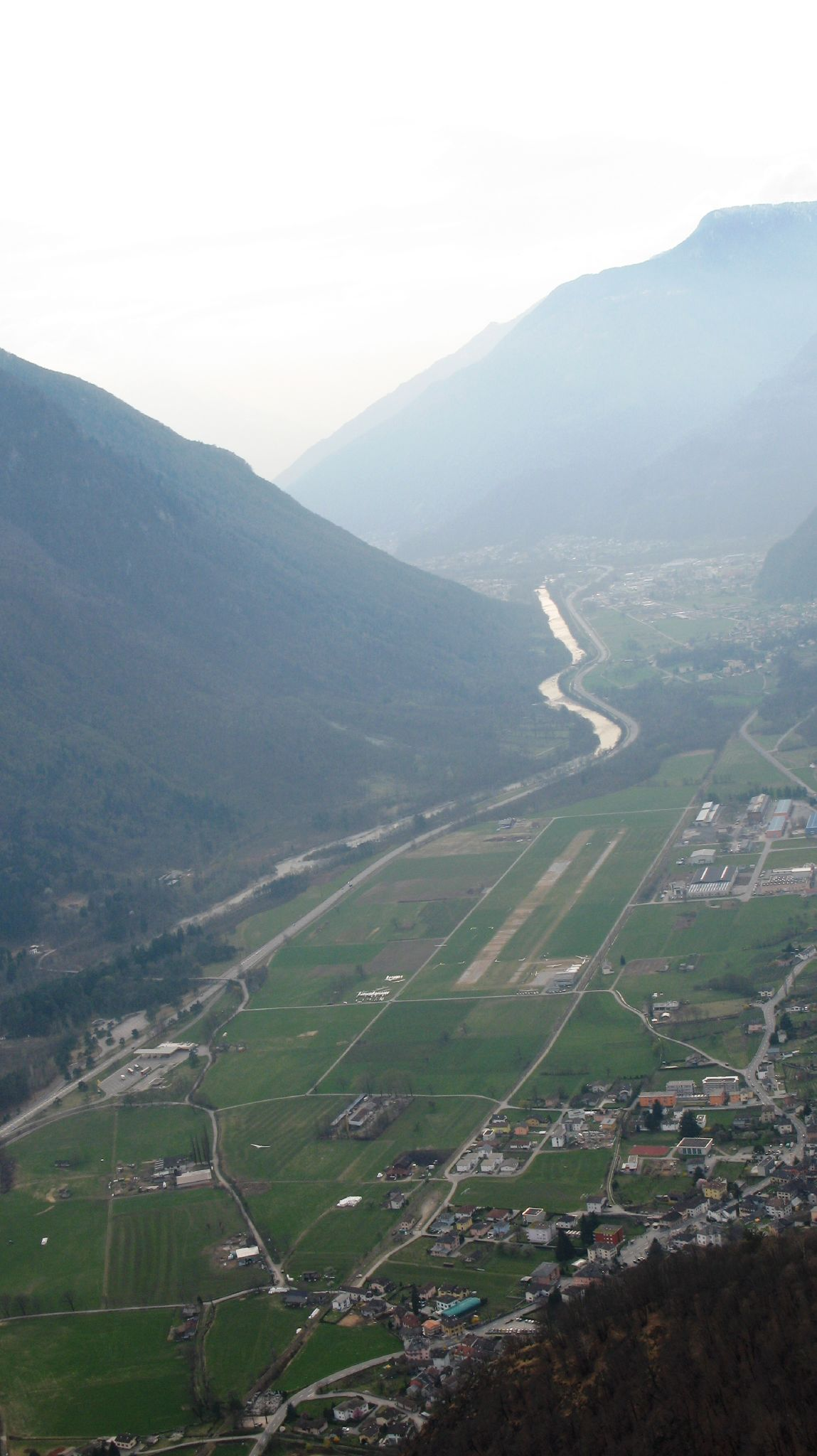
San Vittore airport and village

San Vittore is situated in the lower part of the valley of the river Moesa, just over 2 km (1.2 mi) upstream of the border with the canton of Ticino, and 6 km (3.7 mi) upstream of Arbedo-Castione, where the Moesa joins the Ticino. At 278 meters (912 ft) above sea level, it is the lowest-lying community in the Grisons.

San Vittore has an area, as of 2006, of 22 km^{2} (8.5 sq mi). Of this area, 15.5% is used for agricultural purposes, while 66.7% is forested. Of the rest of the land, 2.8% is settled (buildings or roads) and the remainder (15%) is non-productive (rivers, glaciers or mountains).

Aerial view (1953)

== Demographics ==
San Vittore has a population (as of 31 December 2020) of 864. As of 2008, 14.2% of the population was made up of foreign nationals. Over the last 10 years the population has grown at a rate of 16.2%. Most of the population (as of 2000) speaks Italian (88.7%), with German being second most common (7.6%) and French being third (1.1%).

As of 2000, the gender distribution of the population was 50.6% male and 49.4% female. The age distribution, as of 2000, in San Vittore is; 82 children or 12.5% of the population are between 0 and 9 years old. 32 teenagers or 4.9% are 10 to 14, and 24 teenagers or 3.7% are 15 to 19. Of the adult population, 54 people or 8.2% of the population are between 20 and 29 years old. 126 people or 19.2% are 30 to 39, 117 people or 17.8% are 40 to 49, and 72 people or 11.0% are 50 to 59. The senior population distribution is 81 people or 12.3% of the population are between 60 and 69 years old, 40 people or 6.1% are 70 to 79, there are 25 people or 3.8% who are 80 to 89, and there are 4 people or 0.6% who are 90 to 99.

In the 2007 federal election the most popular party was the SP which received 36.9% of the vote. The next three most popular parties were the SVP (29.3%), the CVP (16.7%) and the FDP (15.6%).

In San Vittore about 73.5% of the population (between age 25-64) have completed either non-mandatory upper secondary education or additional higher education (either university or a Fachhochschule).

San Vittore has an unemployment rate of 2.06%. As of 2005, there were 23 people employed in the primary economic sector and about 10 businesses involved in this sector. 129 people are employed in the secondary sector and there are 13 businesses in this sector. 68 people are employed in the tertiary sector, with 23 businesses in this sector.

The historical population is given in the following table:

year	population
1850	594
1900	517
1950	468
1960	516
1970	666
1980	555
1990	611
2000	657

== Heritage sites of national significance ==
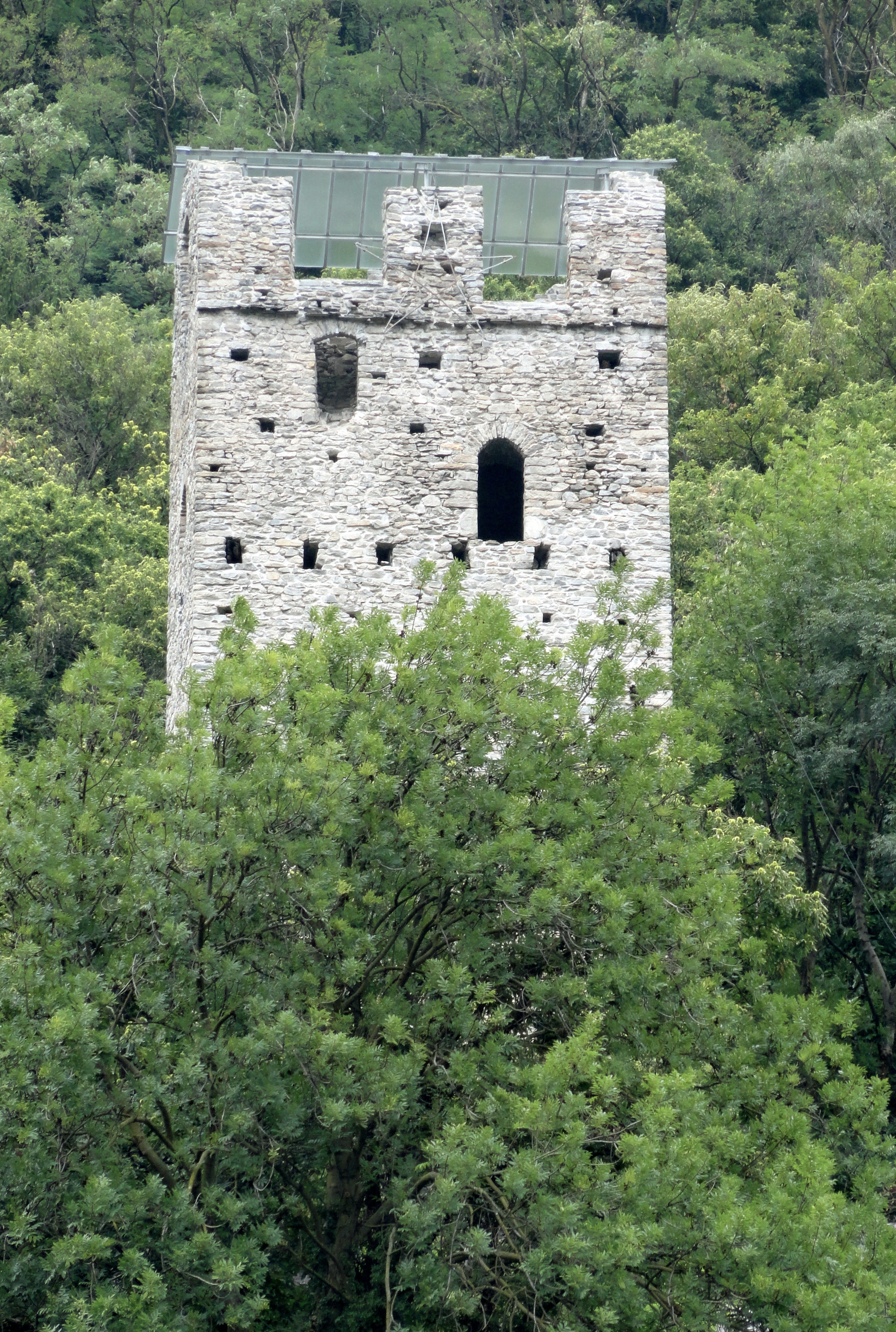
Torre Palas or Torre di Pala

The Chapel of S. Lucio e dintorni and the Torre di Pala are listed as Swiss heritage sites of national significance.
