= Fritz Wirth =

Swiss footballer (born 1953)

Personal information
- Full name: Fritz Wirth
- Date of birth: 14 April 1953 (age 73)
- Place of birth: Grenchen, Switzerland
- Position: Forward

Youth career
- until 1971: FC Grenchen

Senior career*
Years	Team	Apps	(Gls)
1971–1984	FC Grenchen	280	(88)
1974–1975	→ FC Basel (loan)	10	(1)
- * Club domestic league appearances and goals

Fritz Wirth (born 14 April 1953) is a Swiss former footballer who played as a forward in the 1970s and 1980s.

Wirth played his youth football with FC Grenchen and advanced to the senior team during the summer of 1971.

Wirth joined FC Basel's first team on a 12-month loan contract for their 1974–75 season under manager Helmut Benthaus. After playing three games in the Cup of the Alps (one goal) and three games in the Swiss League Cup (two goals), Wirth made his domestic league debut for the club in the home game at the St. Jakob Stadium on 17 August 1974 as Basel drew 2–2 with Xamax. He scored his first domestic league goal for the club on 14 June 1975 in the away game as Basel drew 1–1 with Chênois.

In his one season with the club, Wirth played 23 games scoring a total of five goals; 10 games were in the Nationalliga A, 6 in the Swiss Cup and Swiss League Cup, 3 in the Cup of the Alps and 4 were friendly games. He scored one goal in the domestic league, two in the League Cup, one in the Cup of the Alps and the other was scored during the test games.

After his loan to Basel, Wirth returned to his club of origin and played there until the end of his active playing days. Wirth opened a sports shop in his home town and ran this for 37 years. In March 2016 he passed this on to its new owners.

== Sources ==
- Die ersten 125 Jahre. Publisher: Josef Zindel im Friedrich Reinhardt Verlag, Basel. ISBN 978-3-7245-2305-5
- Verein "Basler Fussballarchiv" Homepage
