= Rossa, Switzerland =

Rossa
- Municipality
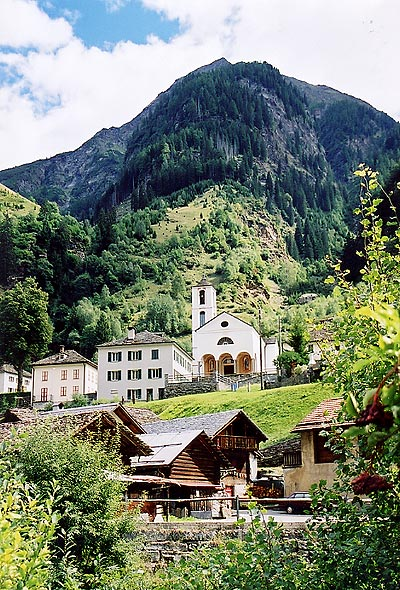

- Flag Coat of arms
- Location of Rossa
- Location within Switzerland Location within Canton of Grisons
- Coordinates: 46°22′N 9°8′E
- Country: Switzerland
- Canton: Grisons
- District: Moesa

Area
  - Total: 58.93 km^{2} (22.75 sq mi)
- Elevation: 1,089 m (3,573 ft)

Population (December 2020)
  - Total: 151
  - Density: 2.56/km^{2} (6.64/sq mi)
- Time zone: UTC+01:00 (CET)
  - Summer (DST): UTC+02:00 (CEST)
- Postal code: 6548
- SFOS number: 3808
- ISO 3166 code: CH-GR
- Surrounded by: Malvaglia (TI), Biasca (TI), Mesocco, Soazza, Cauco
- Website: rossa.ch

Rossa is a municipality in the Moesa Region in the canton of the Grisons in Switzerland. Its official language is Italian.

== History ==
Rossa is first mentioned in 1694.

== Geography ==
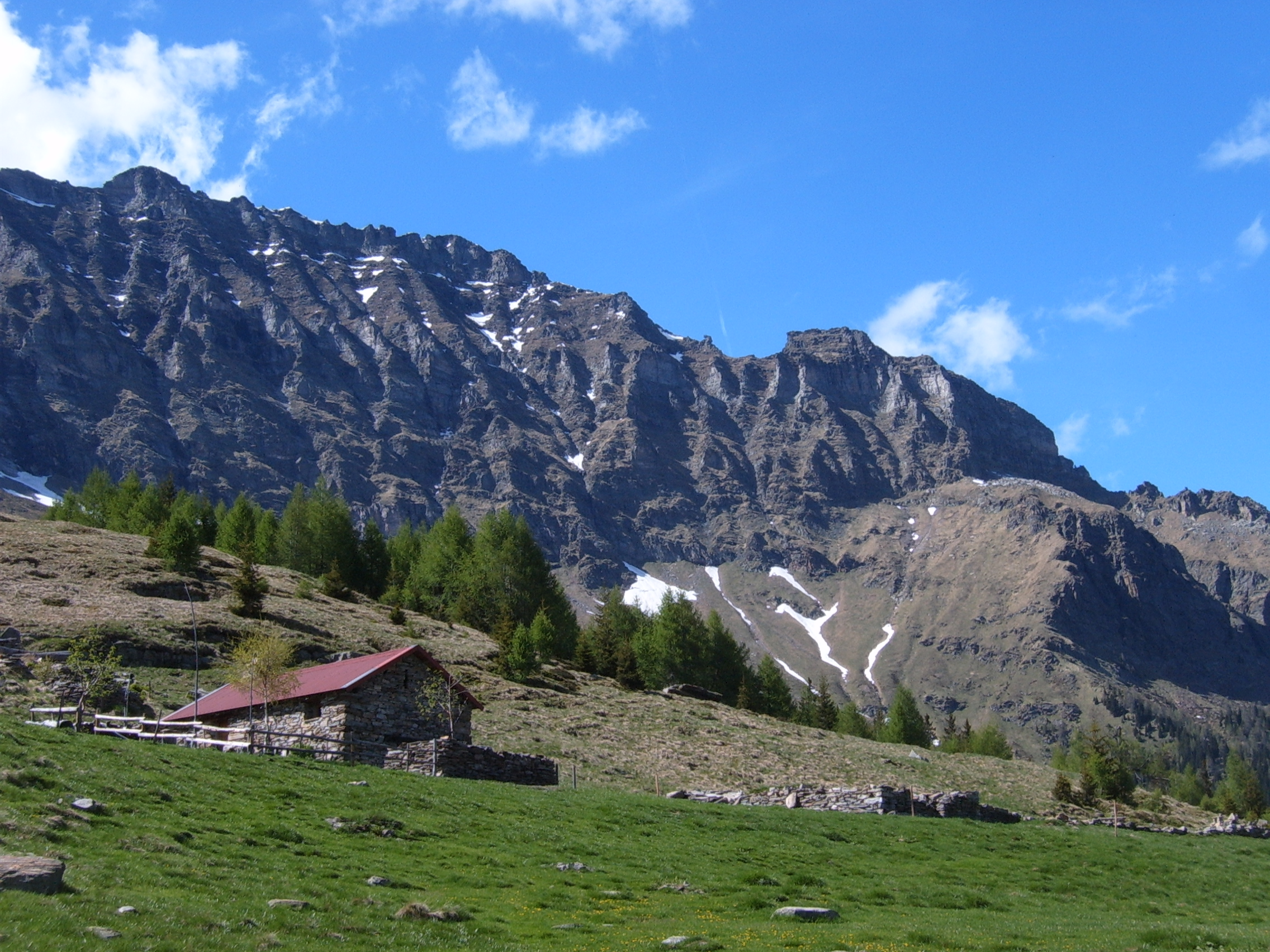
Alp de Cascinarsa

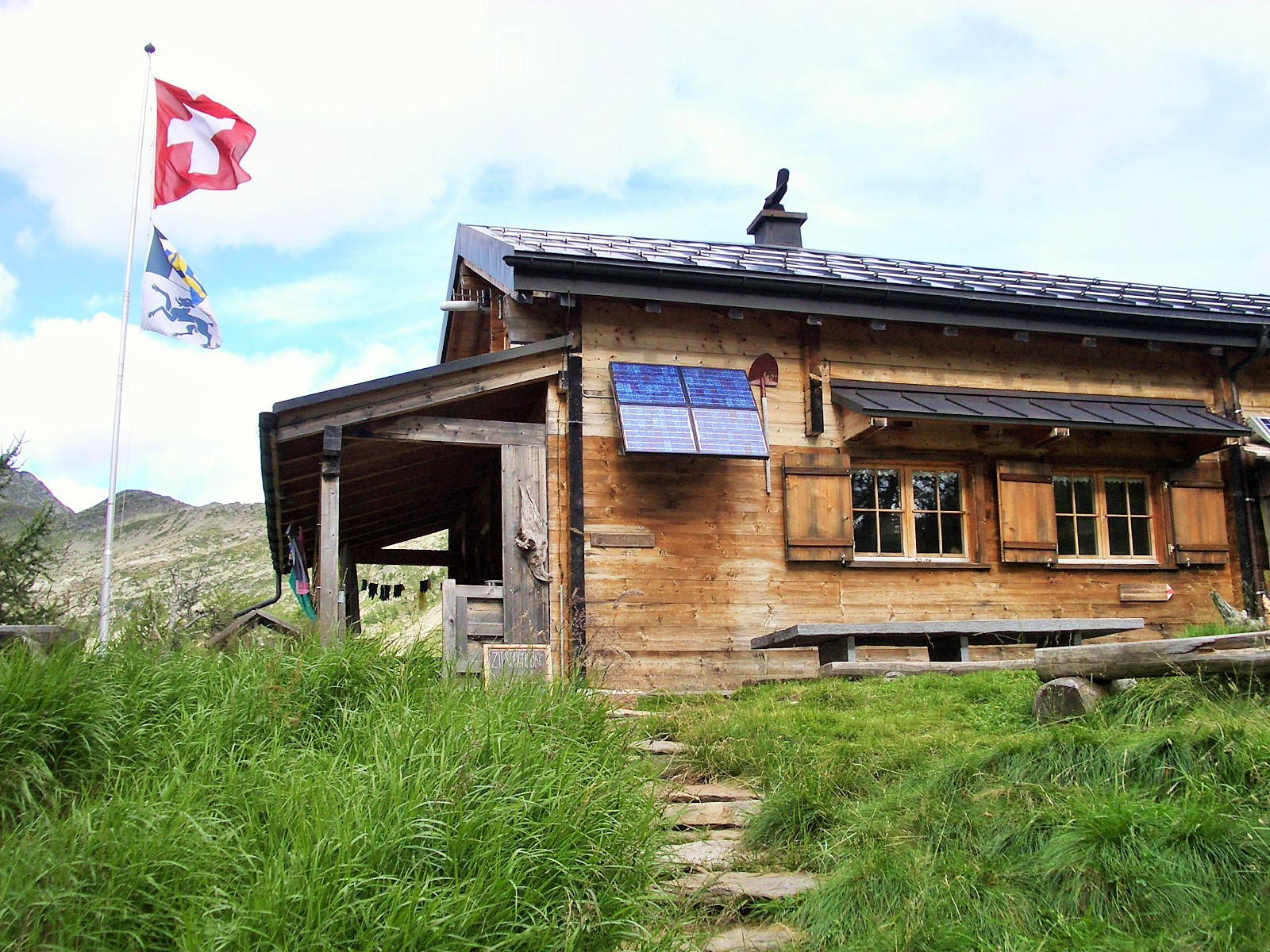
Buffalora hut

Rossa has an area, as of 2006, of 58.9 km^{2} (22.7 sq mi). Of this area, 9.1% is used for agricultural purposes, while 40.8% is forested. Of the rest of the land, 0.4% is settled (buildings or roads) and the remainder (49.7%) is non-productive (rivers, glaciers or mountains).

Before 2017, the municipality was located in the Calanca sub-district of the Moesa district, after 2017 it was part of the Moesa Region. It is the highest municipality of Val Calanca.

== Demographics ==
Rossa has a population (as of 31 December 2020) of 151. As of 2008, 10.7% of the population was made up of foreign nationals. Over the last 10 years the population has decreased at a rate of -14.4%. Most of the population (as of 2000) speaks Italian (84.1%), with German being second most common (11.4%) and French being third ( 3.0%).

As of 2000, the gender distribution of the population was 50.4% male and 49.6% female. The age distribution, as of 2000, in Rossa is; 5 children or 3.8% of the population are between 0 and 9 years old. 6 teenagers or 4.5% are 10 to 14, and 2 teenagers or 1.5% are 15 to 19. Of the adult population, 11 people or 8.3% of the population are between 20 and 29 years old. 9 people or 6.8% are 30 to 39, 23 people or 17.4% are 40 to 49, and 19 people or 14.4% are 50 to 59. The senior population distribution is 17 people or 12.9% of the population are between 60 and 69 years old, 22 people or 16.7% are 70 to 79, there are 14 people or 10.6% who are 80 to 89, and there are 4 people or 3.0% who are 90 to 99.

In the 2007 federal election the most popular party was the SP which received 37.2% of the vote. The next two most popular parties were the SVP (21.5%) and the FDP (20.2%).

In Rossa about 69.3% of the population (between age 25-64) have completed either non-mandatory upper secondary education or additional higher education (either university or a Fachhochschule).

Rossa has an unemployment rate of 2.22%. As of 2005, there were 4 people employed in the primary economic sector and about 3 businesses involved in this sector. 6 people are employed in the secondary sector and there are 2 businesses in this sector. 8 people are employed in the tertiary sector, with 4 businesses in this sector.

The historical population is given in the following table:

year	population
1683	c. 450
1773	331
1850	186
1900	181
1950	117
1980	109
1990	108
2000	132
