= Eigil Nielsen (footballer, born 1948) =

Danish footballer (1948–2019)

Personal information
- Date of birth: 6 December 1948
- Place of birth: Tårs, Denmark
- Date of death: 26 December 2019 (aged 71)
- Place of death: Hjørring, Denmark
- Position: Midfielder

Youth career
- –1966: Hjørring

Senior career*
Years	Team	Apps	(Gls)
1966–1970	Hjørring		
1970–1971	KB		
1971–1974	Winterthur	54	(11)
1974–1978	Basel	99	(18)
1978–1981	Luzern	17	(1)

International career
1971–1975	Denmark	10	(0)
- * Club domestic league appearances and goals

Eigil Nielsen (6 December 1948 – 26 December 2019) was a Danish footballer who played as a midfielder during the late 1960s, 70s and into the 80s.

== Career ==
=== Club ===
Nielsen began his youth football by the local club Hjørring IF and with them his professional career in 1966, before moving to KB in 1970. In 1971, he signed for Switzerland's Winterthur and he played there under head coach Willy Sommer until 1974. He soon became an strategist within the team with his brilliant ideas. However, despite reaching the Swiss League Cup final twice, he was still denied success in the form of a title. Due to financial reasons Winterthur sold Nielsen to FC Basel during the summer break.

Nielsen joined Basel's first team for their 1974–75 season under head coach Helmut Benthaus. He played his debut for his new club in the Cup of the Alps, an away game in Nîmes, on 20 July 1974. He not only scored his first goal for his new team in same game but Basel won 4–2 thanks to a hat-trick from Nielsen and a goal from Ottmar Hitzfeld. After playing in two further games in the pre-season Cup of the Alps and two games in the Swiss League Cup, in which he scored two further goals, Nielsen played his domestic league debut for the club in the home game in the St. Jakob Stadium on 17 August as Basel played a 2–2 with Xamax. He scored his first league goal for his new team in the away game in the Stadion Wankdorf on 12 October. In fact he scored twice as Basel played a 4–4 draw with the Young Boys.

At the end of his first season with the club, Nielsen celebrated a Basel win in the Swiss Cup final as they defeated Winterthur to win the trophy. Then at the end of the 1976–77 Nationalliga A season Basel won the Swiss Championship, winning the play-off match against Servette 2–1, after the two teams had ended the regular season level on points.

Nielsen stayed with Basel for four seasons. Between the years 1974 und 1978 Nielsen played a total of 164 games for FC Basel scoring a total of 30 goals. 99 of these games and 18 goals were in the Swiss domestic league. 21 games were in the Swiss Cup or Swiss League Cup, 23 were international cup games and 30 were test games. Nielsen scored his only European goal on 29 September 1976 in the second leg of the first round of the 1976–77 UEFA Cup. Basel played at home in St. Jakob Stadium and won 3–0 against Glentoran F.C.

In 1978 he signed for Luzern who played in the second highest tier at that time and that season Luzern won promotion.

=== International ===
Nielsen was capped ten times by the Denmark national team, making his international debut in Denmark's 3-2 win over Japan on 28 July 1971 in Parken, Copenhagen. His last match for the national team was in a 6-1 defeat to Romania on 23 August 1975 in Bucharest.

== Private life ==
Nielsen retired from his football career at the end of the 1981–82 season due to an injury caused by a serious foul in December 1981. He had suffered a fractured fibula with torn ankle ligaments in a game against St. Gallen. Together with his family, he then returned to his Danish homeland. The trained banker Eigil Nielsen then moved to live on the island of Fuerteventura for around ten years. He then returned to his hometown of Hjørring in northern Jutland, where he opened a sporting goods store, which he sold when he fully retired. Now the last part of his life began, which increasingly faded into the fog as Alzheimer's developed. On 22 December 2019 he suffered a stroke, from which he never recovered and he died on Saint Stephen's Day, shortly after his 71st birthday. Nielsen was married and the couple had two sons. Their youngest son died in 1989 and his wife died in 2009.

== Honours ==
Basel

- Swiss League: 1976–77
- Swiss Cup: 1974–75

== Sources ==
- Josef Zindel (2018). FC Basel 1893. Die ersten 125 Jahre (in German). Basel: Friedrich Reinhardt Verlag. ISBN 978-3-7245-2305-5.
- Verein "Basler Fussballarchiv" Homepage
