= Pala Castle =

Tower in Switzerland

- Tor di Pala; Torre Palas
- San Vittore
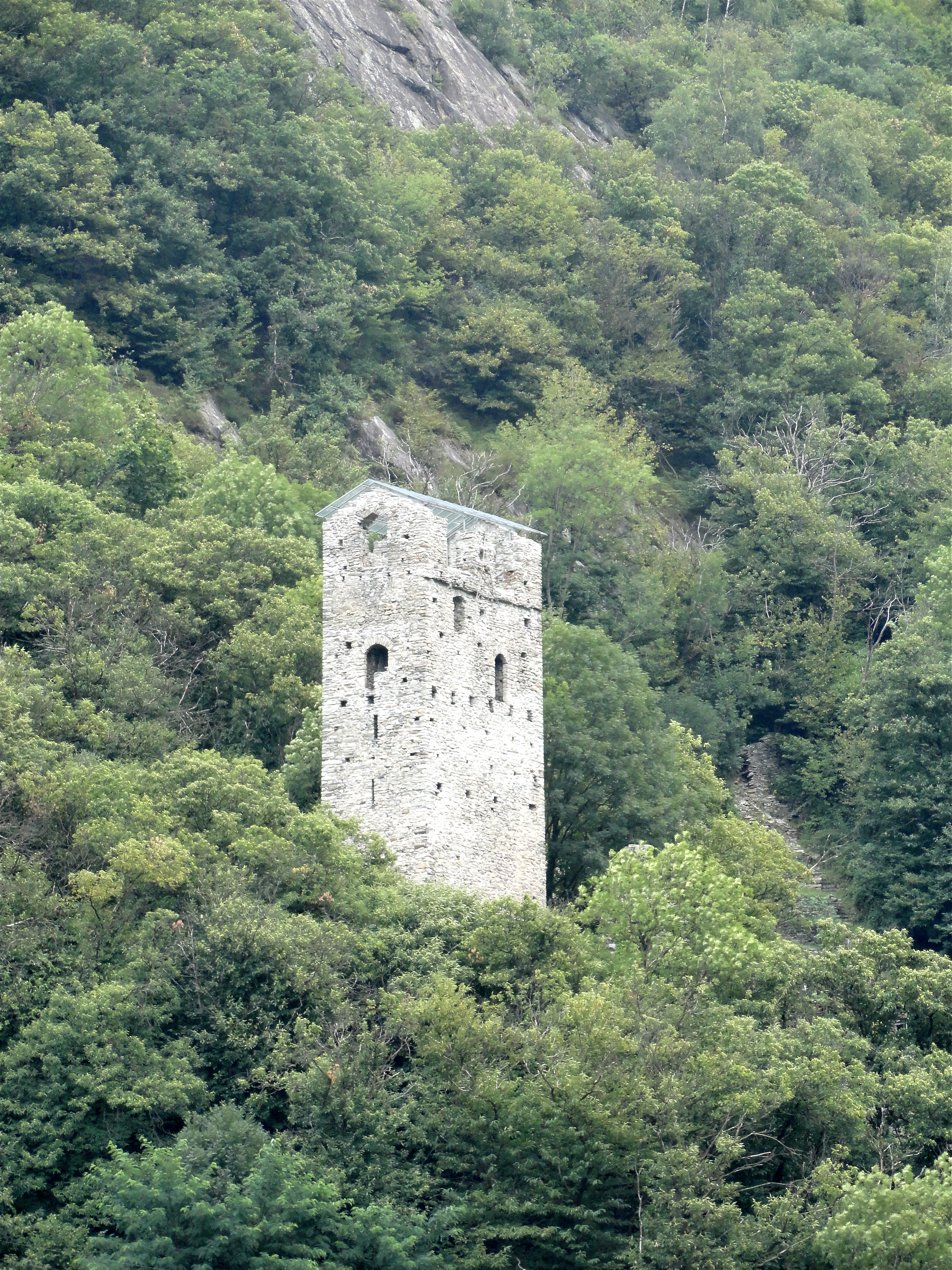
- View from the village

Site information
- Type: hill castle
- Code: CH-GR
- Condition: ruin

Location
- Coordinates: 46°14′23.35″N 9°06′19.27″E
- Height: 310 m above the sea

Site history
- Built: 12th century

Pala Castle (Italian: Torre di Pala) is a tower in the municipality of San Vittore of the Canton of Graubünden in Switzerland. It is a Swiss heritage site of national significance.

== History ==
The oldest part of the castle, the southern residential tower, may date to the late 12th century. It may have been built for a local noble, Albertus de sancto Victore, who is mentioned in 1168, or for the Counts of Sax. In 1265 the castle first appears in a historical record with the Sax family as owners, though whether they built it or forced the original owners out is not recorded. The larger northern tower was built in the second half of the 13th century, by the Counts of Sax. The two towers were separated by a three meters (ten foot) wide gap and were linked by a bridge. Around 1400 the northern tower was raised to its present height of six stories and topped with a gable roof. At that time the castle was inhabited by either a cadet branch of the Sax-Misox family or by one of their vassals. Whoever it was, in the 15th century they died out and the castle was abandoned.

The abandoned castle slowly fell into ruin. It was cleaned and stabilized in 1944 and again in 1997.

== Castle site ==
The two towers that make up the castle were built on a small terrace on a mountain north of the village of San Vittore. The southern tower has mostly collapsed and was probably used for apartments. The northern tower is still standing and has a modern roof added to protect it from the elements. The northern tower was built with several latrines and a drain along with numerous niches in the walls. The tower may have had a small ring wall which housed a few small buildings.

== Gallery ==
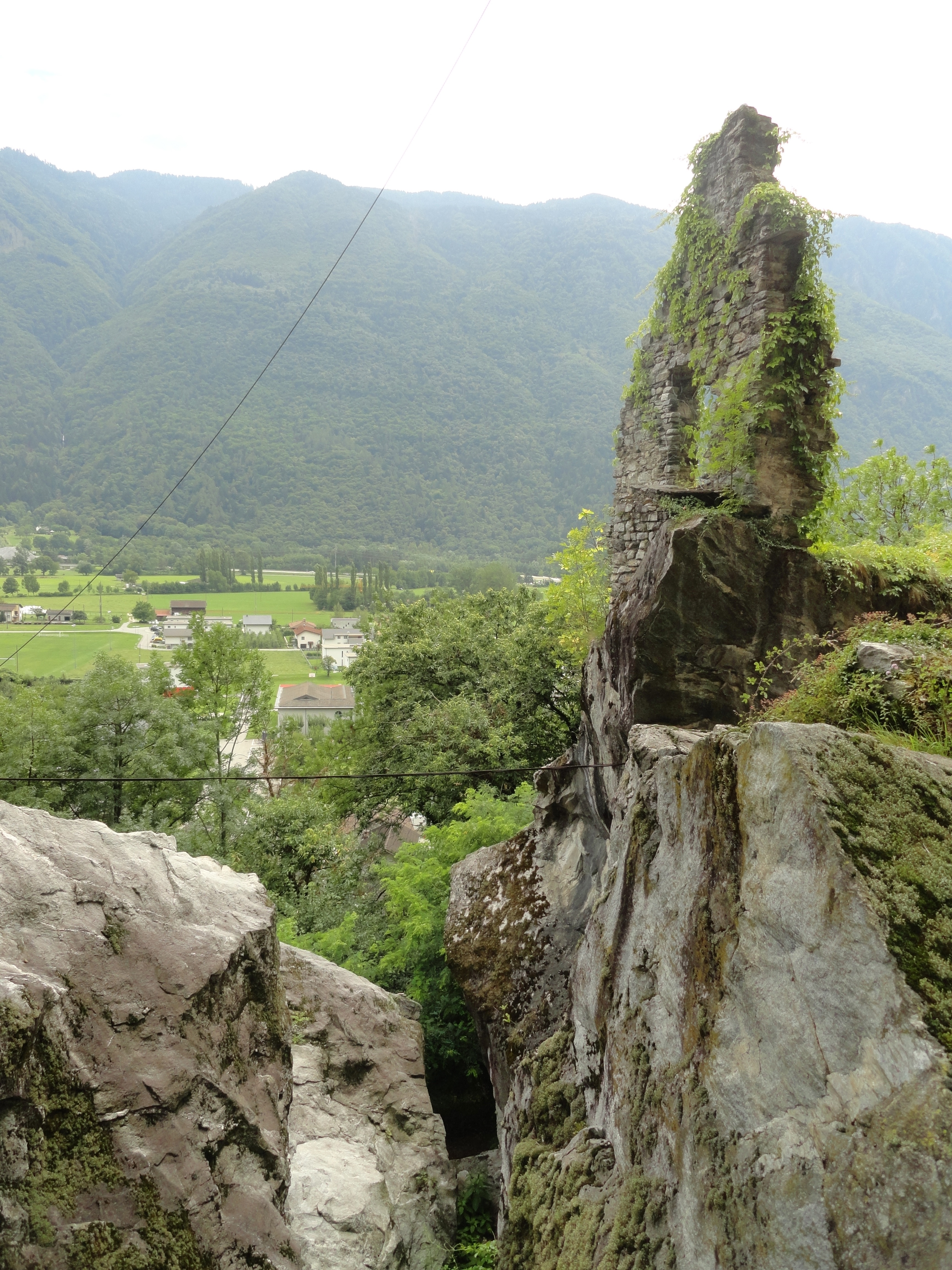
Ruins of the southern building and the gap between the two towers

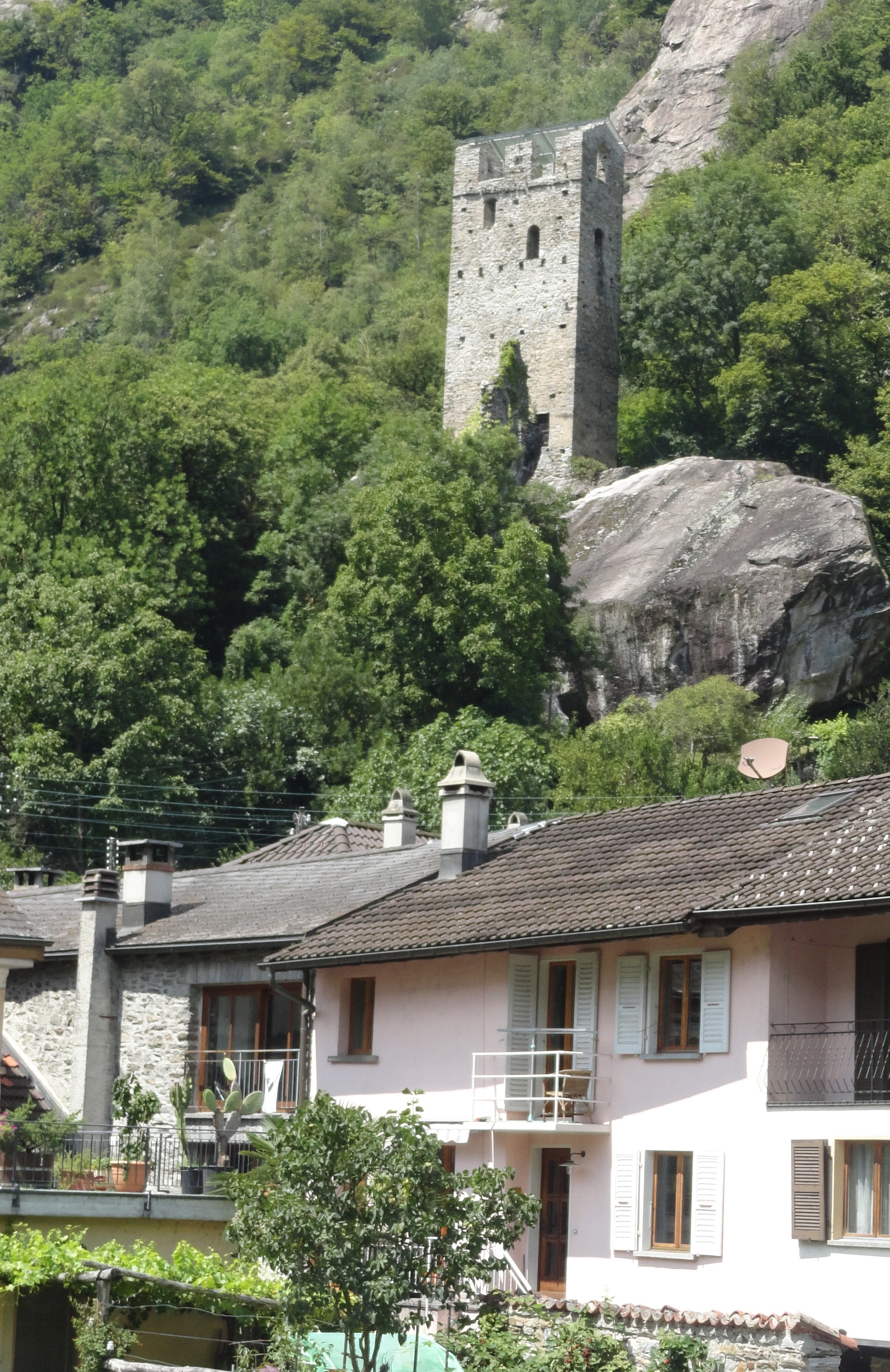
Location of Torre Pala above the village

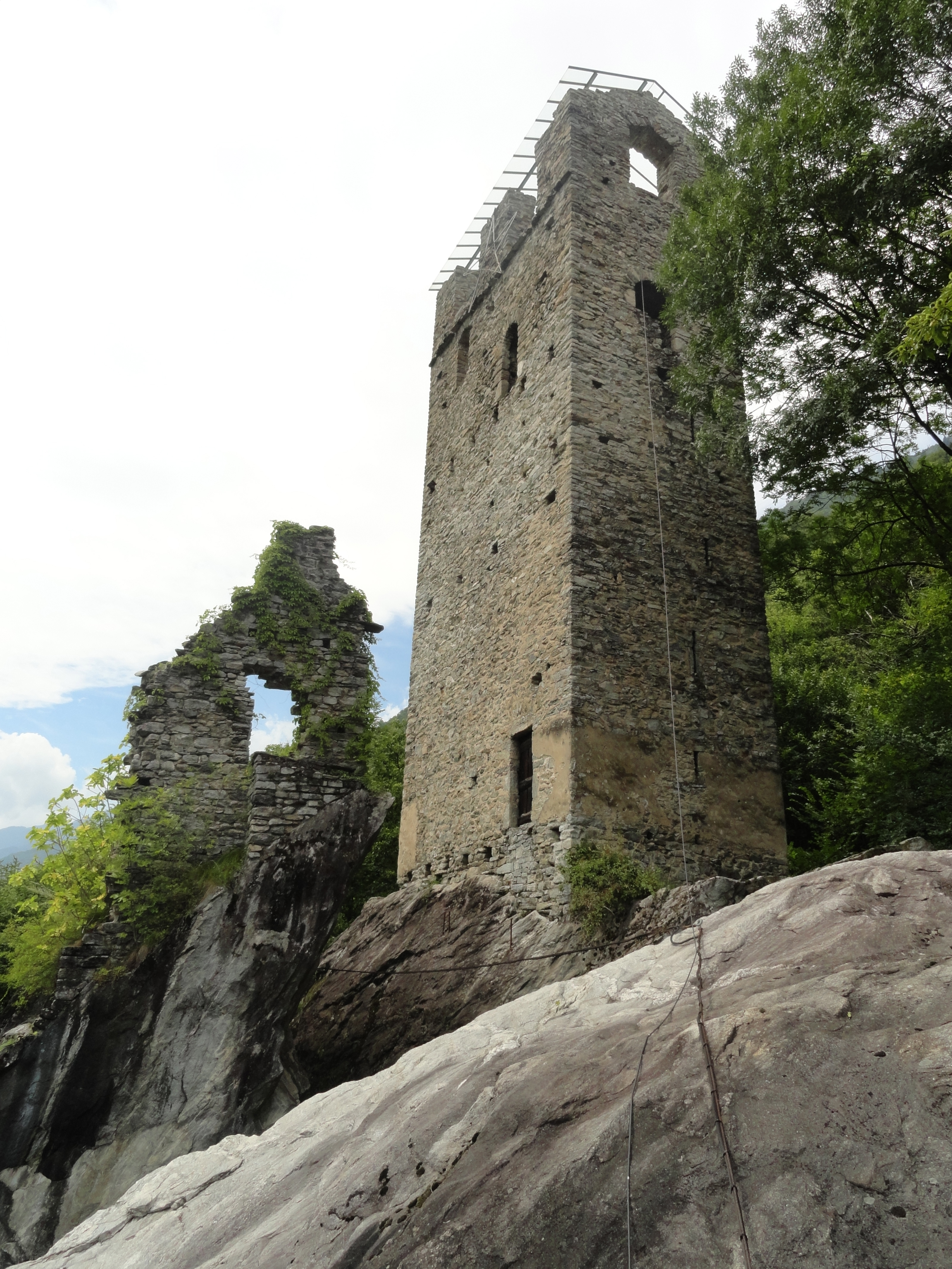
North and south towers

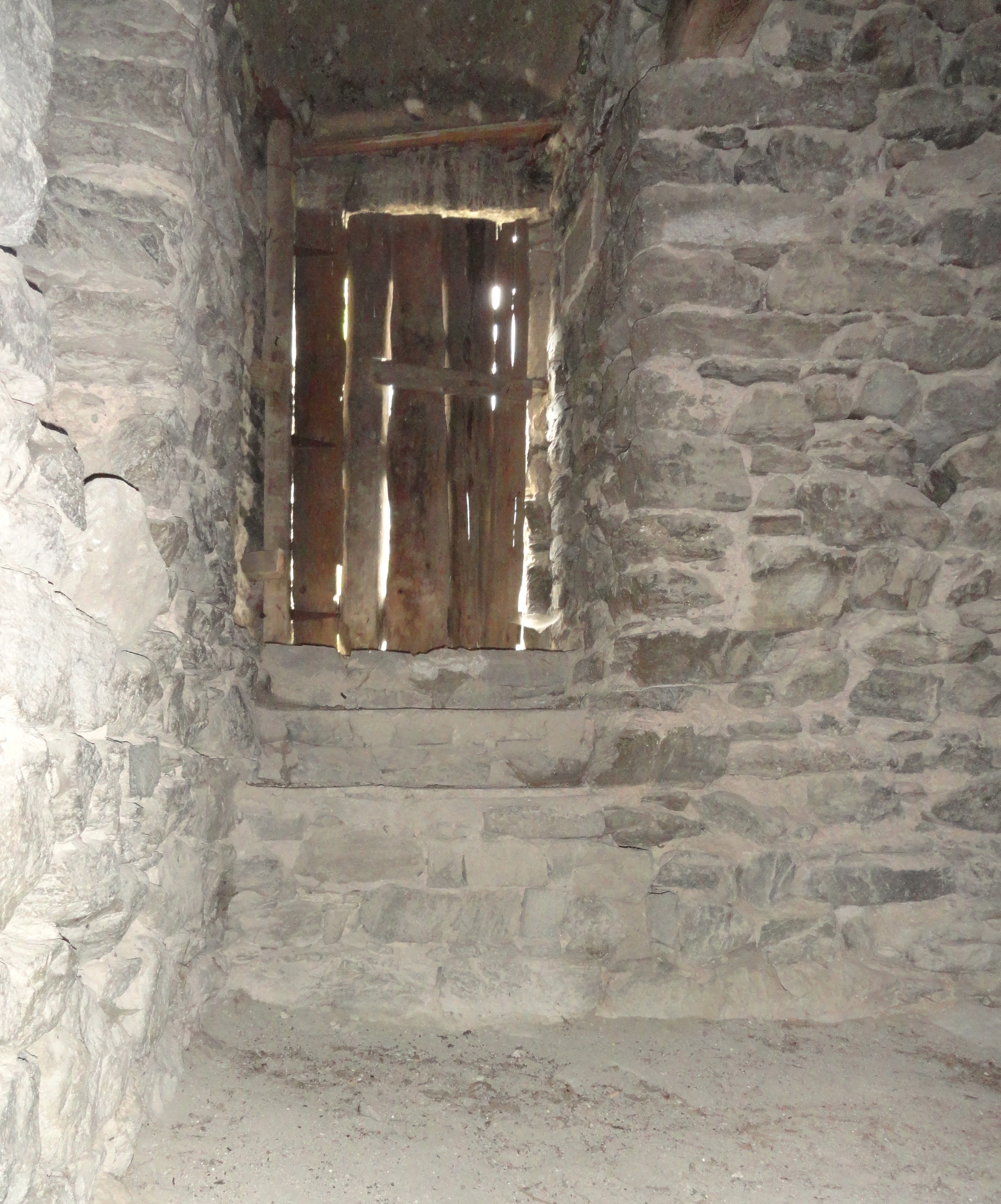
Window inside the north tower

== See also ==
- List of castles in Switzerland
