= Lumino =

- Municipality
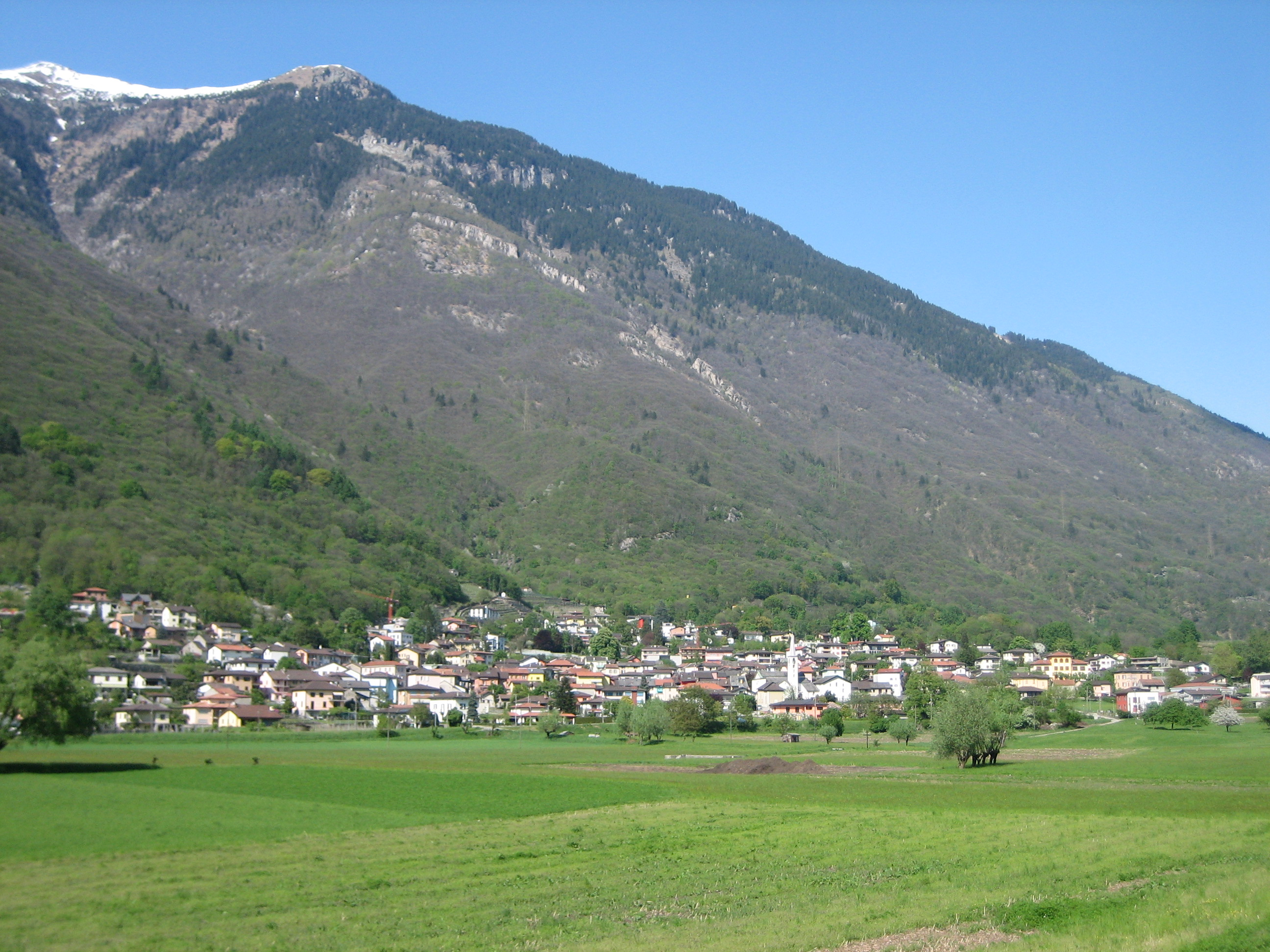
- Lumino village

- Flag Coat of arms
- Location of Lumino
- Location within Switzerland Location within Canton of Ticino
- Coordinates: 46°14′N 9°04′E
- Country: Switzerland
- Canton: Ticino
- District: Bellinzona

Government
  - Mayor: Sindaco

Area
  - Total: 9.95 km^{2} (3.84 sq mi)
- Elevation: 270 m (890 ft)

Population (December 2004)
  - Total: 1,185
  - Density: 119/km^{2} (308/sq mi)
- Time zone: UTC+01:00 (CET)
  - Summer (DST): UTC+02:00 (CEST)
- Postal code: 6533
- SFOS number: 5010
- ISO 3166 code: CH-TI
- Surrounded by: Arbedo-Castione, Claro, Roveredo (GR), San Vittore (GR)
- Website: www.lumino.ch

Lumino is a municipality in the district of Bellinzona in the canton of Ticino in Switzerland.

== History ==
Lumino is first mentioned in 1168 as locus Lugomini. In German it used to be known as Lugmin. The convenient location at the entrance to the Val Mesolcina and the ancient fortifications in the neighborhood indicate that there was an early settlement. The assets of the Bishop of Como in Lumino were given to Capitanei of Locarno in the 12th century. It is listed as part of the County of Bellinzona in 1335. By 1242 it was already part of a community with Castione, which was dissolved in 1818. Several properties and the tithe belonged to the parish church of Bellinzona. The Church of St. Mamette was first mentioned in 1237 and became a parish church before 1591. The border between Lumino and the Graubünden village of San Vittore was finalized, after centuries of dispute, in 1776. During construction of the new roadway over the San Bernardino Pass in 1818, the cantonal authorities forbade the inhabitants of Lumino from making improvements on the road between the Moesa bridge and the border with Graubünden. In the last decades of the 20th century, the construction of many new houses (in 2000, 73% of the working population worked outside the municipality) and the resettlement of a small but thriving industry changed the village from a small farming village.

== Geography ==
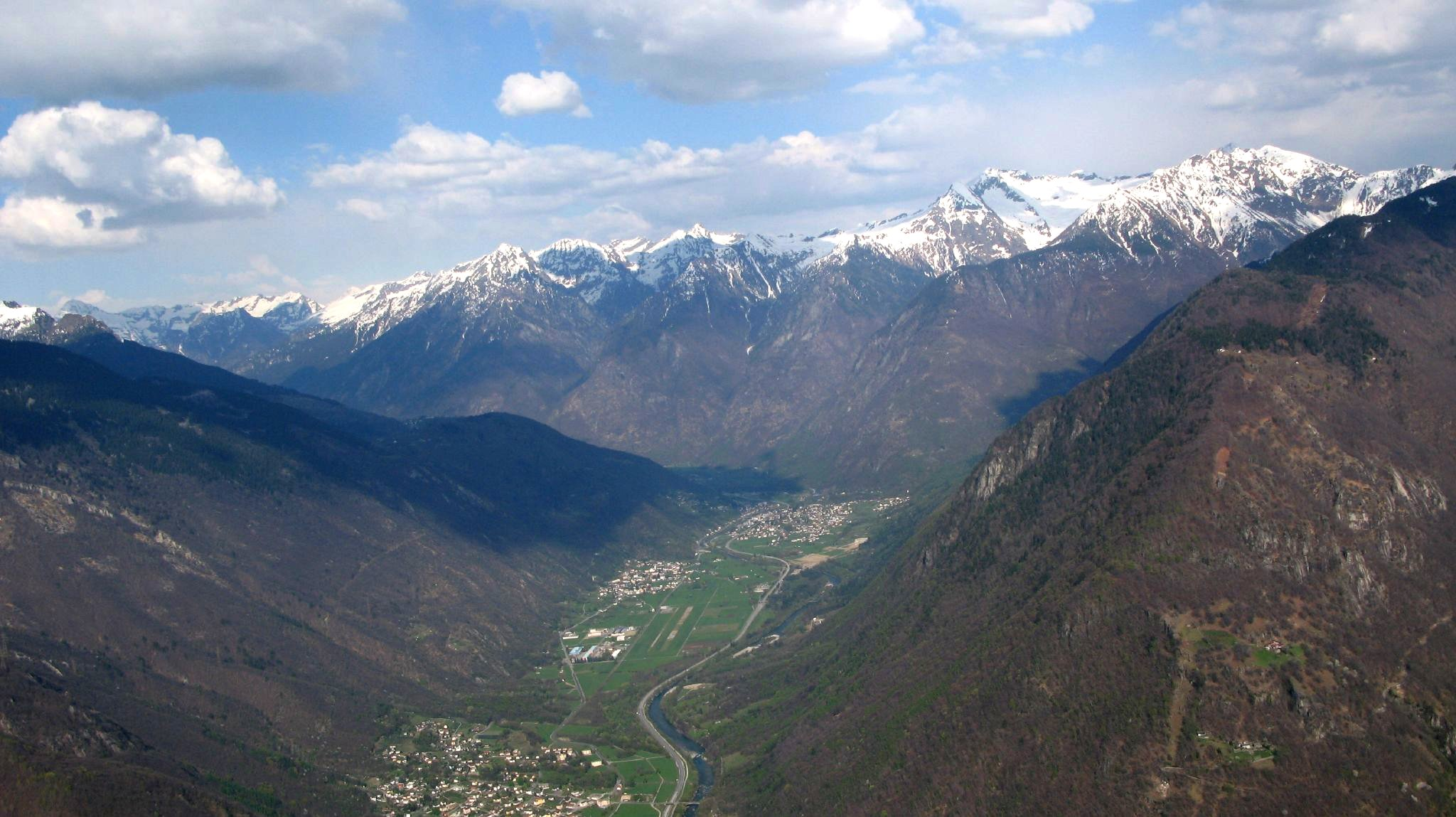
Roveredo, San Vittore, Lumino.

Aerial view (1953)

Lumino has an area, as of 1997, of 9.95 square kilometers (3.84 sq mi). Of this area, 1 km^{2} (0.39 sq mi) or 10.1% is used for agricultural purposes, while 7.59 km^{2} (2.93 sq mi) or 76.3% is forested. Of the rest of the land, 0.53 km^{2} (0.20 sq mi) or 5.3% is settled (buildings or roads), 0.15 km^{2} (37 acres) or 1.5% is either rivers or lakes and 0.41 km^{2} (0.16 sq mi) or 4.1% is unproductive land.

Of the built up area, housing and buildings made up 2.5% and transportation infrastructure made up 1.7%. Out of the forested land, 73.5% of the total land area is heavily forested and 2.4% is covered with orchards or small clusters of trees. Of the agricultural land, 6.1% is used for growing crops, while 1.4% is used for orchards or vine crops and 2.5% is used for alpine pastures. All the water in the municipality is flowing water. Of the unproductive areas, 3.1% is unproductive vegetation.

== Coat of arms ==
The blazon of the municipal coat of arms is Per pale Gules Leaves issuant from an Amphora Or and Azure a Lion rampant Or a Crescent in canton and Overall a Bend Gules. The arms of the municipality are those of the architect Marco Mades, a citizen of Lumino, who became famous for his works of art in Rome.

== Demographics ==
Lumino has a population (as of December 2020) of 1,587. As of 2008, 14.2% of the population are foreign nationals. Over the last 10 years (1997–2007) the population has changed at a rate of 6.9%.

Most of the population (as of 2000) speaks Italian(90.3%), with German being second most common ( 4.4%) and Albanian being third ( 1.8%). Of the Swiss national languages (as of 2000), 50 speak German, 10 people speak French, 1,018 people speak Italian, and 3 people speak Romansh. The remainder (46 people) speak another language.

As of 2008, the gender distribution of the population was 47.6% male and 52.4% female. The population was made up of 512 Swiss men (39.1% of the population), and 111 (8.5%) non-Swiss men. There were 601 Swiss women (45.9%), and 85 (6.5%) non-Swiss women.

In 2008 there were 12 live births to Swiss citizens and 3 births to non-Swiss citizens, and in same time span there were 7 deaths of Swiss citizens and 2 non-Swiss citizen deaths. Ignoring immigration and emigration, the population of Swiss citizens increased by 5 while the foreign population increased by 1. There was 1 Swiss man and 2 Swiss women who immigrated back to Switzerland. At the same time, there were 4 non-Swiss men who immigrated from another country to Switzerland. The total Swiss population change in 2008 (from all sources) was an increase of 49 and the non-Swiss population change was a decrease of 12 people. This represents a population growth rate of 3.0%.

The age distribution, as of 2009, in Lumino is; 145 children or 11.1% of the population are between 0 and 9 years old and 123 teenagers or 9.4% are between 10 and 19. Of the adult population, 136 people or 10.4% of the population are between 20 and 29 years old. 181 people or 13.8% are between 30 and 39, 227 people or 17.3% are between 40 and 49, and 170 people or 13.0% are between 50 and 59. The senior population distribution is 166 people or 12.7% of the population are between 60 and 69 years old, 99 people or 7.6% are between 70 and 79, there are 62 people or 4.7% who are over 80.

As of 2000, there were 470 private households in the municipality, and an average of 2.3 persons per household. In 2000 there were 327 single family homes (or 74.3% of the total) out of a total of 440 inhabited buildings. There were 78 two family buildings (17.7%) and 17 multi-family buildings (3.9%). There were also 18 buildings in the municipality that were multipurpose buildings (used for both housing and commercial or another purpose).

The vacancy rate for the municipality, in 2008, was 0%. In 2000 there were 603 apartments in the municipality. The most common apartment size was the 4 room apartment of which there were 225. There were 21 single room apartments and 150 apartments with five or more rooms. Of these apartments, a total of 467 apartments (77.4% of the total) were permanently occupied, while 121 apartments (20.1%) were seasonally occupied and 15 apartments (2.5%) were empty. As of 2007, the construction rate of new housing units was 3.2 new units per 1000 residents.

The historical population is given in the following table:

year	population
1583	350
1698	358
1801	297
1850	522
1900	588
1950	600
2000	1,127

== Politics ==
In the 2007 federal election the most popular party was the FDP which received 33.39% of the vote. The next three most popular parties were the SP (27.82%), the CVP (20.31%) and the Ticino League (8.3%). In the federal election, a total of 497 votes were cast, and the voter turnout was 58.3%.

In the 2007 Gran Consiglio election, there were a total of 873 registered voters in Lumino, of which 651 or 74.6% voted. 12 blank ballots and 2 null ballots were cast, leaving 637 valid ballots in the election. The most popular party was the PLRT which received 223 or 35.0% of the vote. The next three most popular parties were; the PS (with 109 or 17.1%), the PPD+GenGiova (with 105 or 16.5%) and the SSI (with 101 or 15.9%).

In the 2007 Consiglio di Stato election, there were 8 blank ballots and 1 null ballot, which left 642 valid ballots in the election. The most popular party was the PLRT which received 212 or 33.0% of the vote. The next three most popular parties were; the PS (with 152 or 23.7%), the PPD (with 106 or 16.5%) and the SSI (with 86 or 13.4%).

== Economy ==
As of 2007, Lumino had an unemployment rate of 2.27%. As of 2005, there were 5 people employed in the primary economic sector and about 2 businesses involved in this sector. 137 people are employed in the secondary sector and there are 22 businesses in this sector. 102 people are employed in the tertiary sector, with 31 businesses in this sector.

There were 506 residents of the municipality who were employed in some capacity, of which females made up 37.4% of the workforce. In 2000, there were 191 workers who commuted into the municipality and 396 workers who commuted away. The municipality is a net exporter of workers, with about 2.1 workers leaving the municipality for every one entering. Of the working population, 7.3% used public transportation to get to work, and 68% used a private car.

As of 2009, there was one hotel in Lumino.

== Religion ==
From the 2000 census, 923 or 81.9% were Roman Catholic, while 42 or 3.7% belonged to the Swiss Reformed Church. There are 124 individuals (or about 11.00% of the population) who belong to another church (not listed on the census), and 38 individuals (or about 3.37% of the population) did not answer the question.

== Education ==
In Lumino about 68.5% of the population (between age 25-64) have completed either non-mandatory upper secondary education or additional higher education (either university or a Fachhochschule).

In Lumino there are a total of 209 students (as of 2009). The Ticino education system provides up to three years of non-mandatory kindergarten and in Lumino there are 45 children in kindergarten. The primary school program lasts for five years and includes both a standard school and a special school. In the municipality, 64 students attend the standard primary schools and 4 students attend the special school. In the lower secondary school system, students either attend a two-year middle school followed by a two-year pre-apprenticeship or they attend a four-year program to prepare for higher education. There are 44 students in the two-year middle school and 16 students are in the four-year advanced program.

The upper secondary school includes several options, but at the end of the upper secondary program, a student should be prepared to enter a trade or to continue to a university or college. In Ticino, vocational students may either attend school while working on their internship or apprenticeship (which takes three or four years) or may attend school followed by an internship or apprenticeship (which takes one year as a full-time student or one and a half to two years as a part-time student). There are 12 vocational students who are attending school full-time and 21 who attend part-time. The professional program lasts three years and prepares a student for a job in engineering, nursing, computer science, business, tourism and similar fields. There are 3 students in the professional program.

As of 2000, there were 5 students in Lumino who came from another municipality, while 113 residents attended schools outside the municipality.
