= Val Calanca =

Valley of the Swiss Alps

Coordinates: 46°20′09″N 9°07′08″E

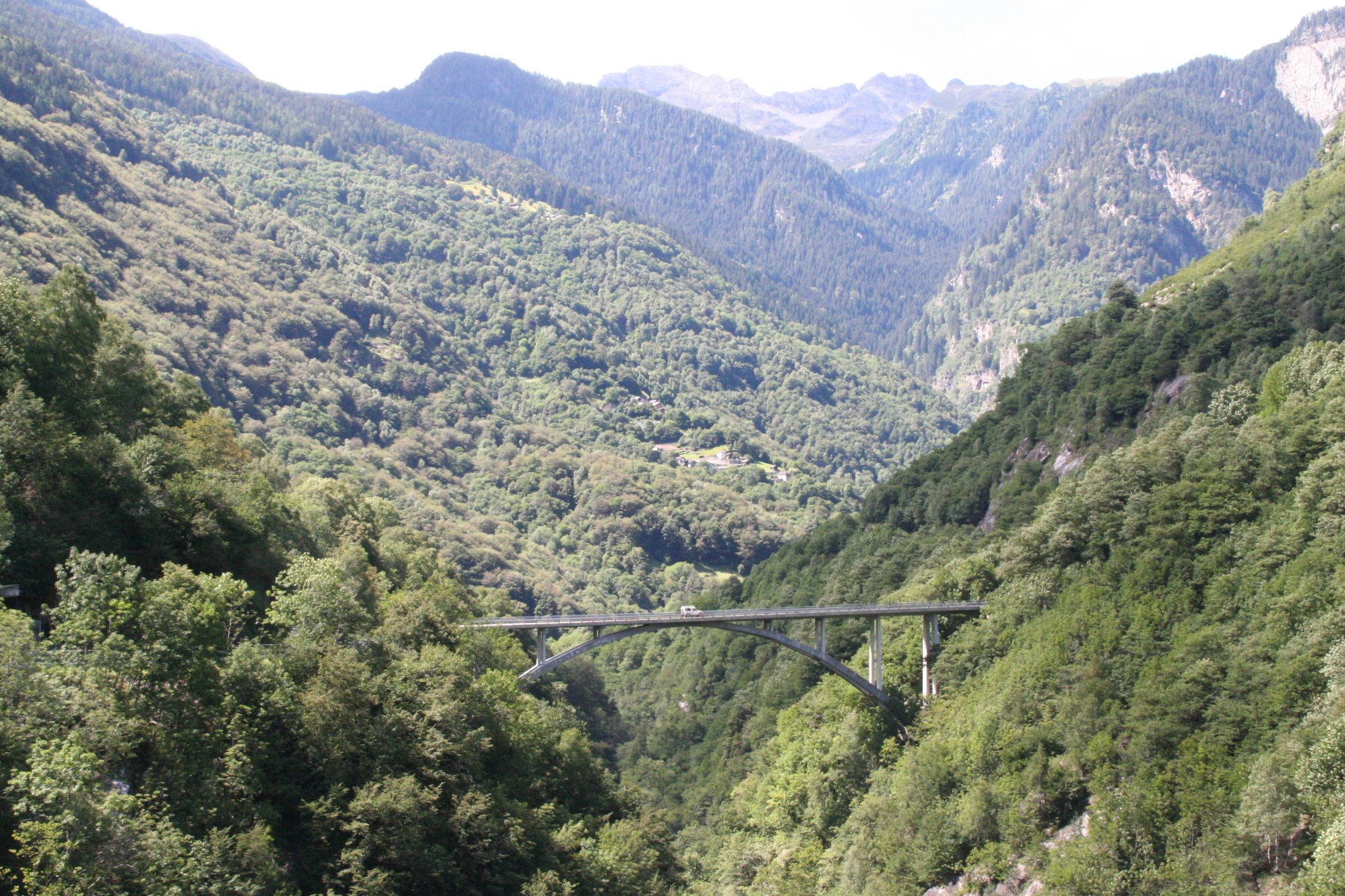
The entrance of the Val Calanca

The Val Calanca is a valley of the Swiss Alps, located in the Lepontine Alps. The valley is drained by the Calancasca, a tributary of the Moesa (Ticino basin), at Roveredo. The highest mountains surrounding the Val Calanca are the Puntone dei Fraciòn (3,202 m / 10,505 ft) and the Zapporthorn (3,152 m / 10,341 ft).

== Geography ==
The valley extends 26 kilometres (16 mi) from North to south. The valleys main river is the Calancasca. The Lago de Calvaresc is located within the Natural park, east of Rossa. The highest mountains are the Puntone dei Fraciòn (3,202 m / 10,505 ft) at the border to Ticino, and the Zapporthorn (3,152 m / 10,341 ft). Several mountain passes exist connecting the Val Calanca to the neighbouring valleys.

== Human geography ==
The valley belongs to the Moesa District, in the Swiss canton of Graubünden. The main villages are (from north to south): Rossa, Cauco, Selma, Arvigo, Buseno and Santa Maria in Calanca.

Due to migration out of the valley there were about 800 inhabitants in 2021. Castaneda, Switzerland was formerly surrounded by chestnut trees, threatened by overgrowth of taller trees. Landarenca is a car-free village that can only be visited on foot, its 10 inhabitants live of tourism. The only major industry in the Val Calanca is a quarry, producing 10,000 cubic metres (350,000 cu ft) of Gneiss per year. In Rossa, archeologists discovered 1 kilometre (0.62 mi) of dry stone walls of a settlement called scatta from the 16th century. The British painter David Tremlett painted the exterior of 3 historic churches. Braggio is the highest situated village and also can only be reached by foot or gondola. Avalanche barriers from stone are being replaced with 4 m (13 ft) high steel constructions anchored up to 8 m (26 ft) in the ground there. At the Alp di Stabveder, a grey goat typical for the valley was preserved.
