= Santa Maria in Calanca Castle =

Tower in Switzerland

Santa Maria in Calanca
- Tower of Sta. Maria in Calanca
- Santa Maria in Calanca
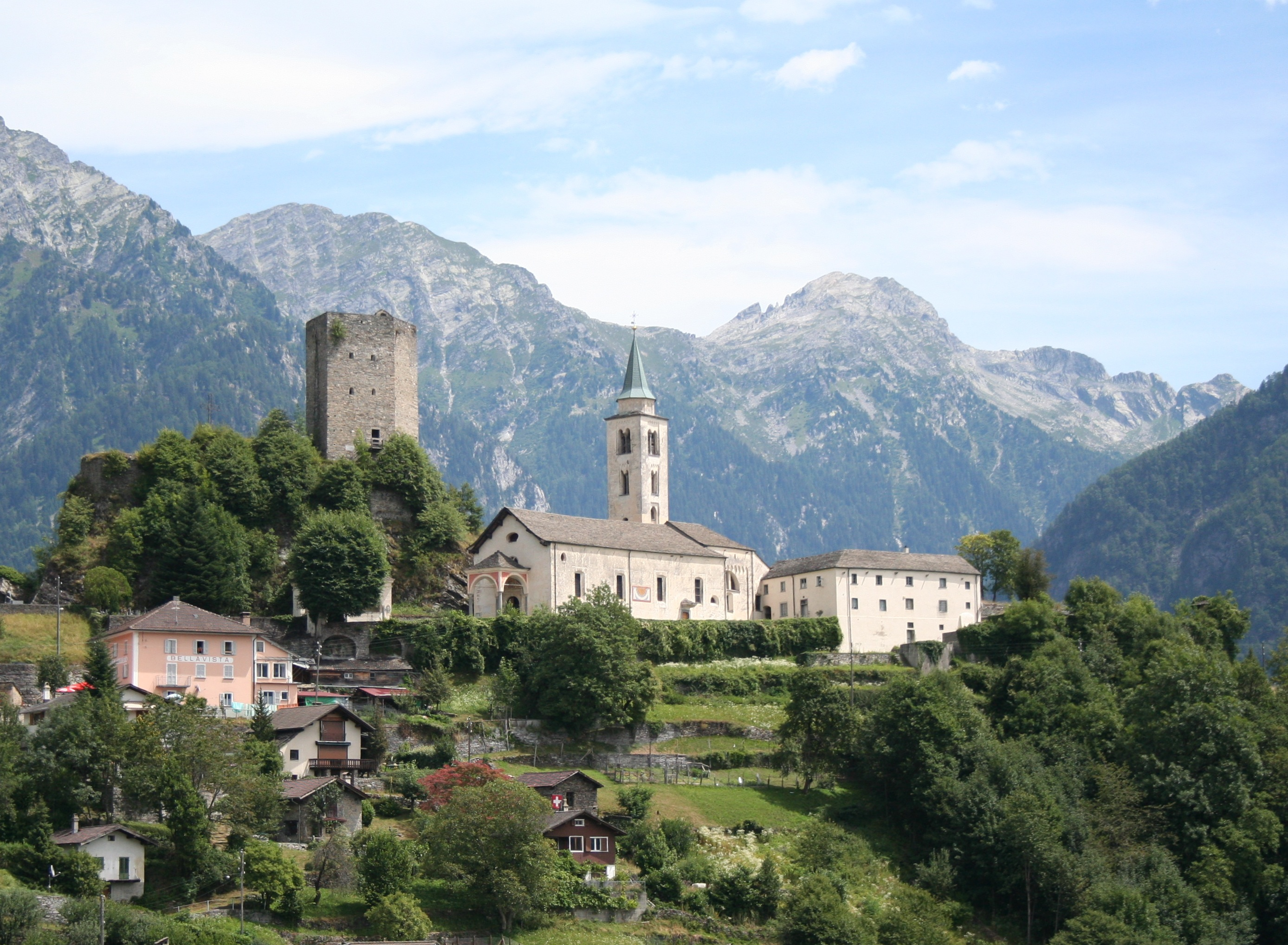
- Tower and church of Sta. Maria Assunta

Site information
- Type: hill castle
- Code: CH-GR
- Condition: ruin

Location
- Coordinates: 46°15′44.50″N 09°08′44.84″E
- Height: 970 m

Site history
- Built: about 1300

Santa Maria in Calanca Castle (Italian: Torre di Sta. Maria) is a tower in the municipality of Santa Maria in Calanca of the Canton of Graubünden in Switzerland. It, along with the neighboring Church of the Assumption of St. Mary, are both Swiss heritage sites of national significance.

== History ==
The castle ruins are located on a hill top at the entrance to the Calanca valley. The hill top was inhabited prehistorically and by the late Roman era was home to the Church of Santa Maria. By the High Middle Ages it was the political center of the entire valley. By the 12th century the first castle was built on the hill below the church. This castle was probably built for the de Calanca family, of which Anricus de Calanca is first mentioned in 1203. The first castle probably consisted of a ring wall that followed the top of the hill and a residential building in the north corner.

Around the end of the 13th century, the first castle was replaced with a new tower. Around this time the castle and lands had passed to the powerful Counts of Sax-Misox. The first mention of a member of the family at Santa Maria was Martin von Sax in 1291. The original castle was replaced with large five-sided donjon. Two of the three levels were built as living quarters. The stairways, chimneys and toilets were all built into the walls. The lower level held the cistern and supplies for the castle. The high entrance into the castle was on the west side. The layout and design of Santa Maria is unlike any other castle in Alps and northern Italy, but resembles a number of castles in northern and central France. The builder of the castle was likely trained in France, which would explain the unusual design.

In 1434 the castle was owned by the Sax-Grono branch of the Sax-Misox family. In 1480 they sold their headquarters at Mesocco Castle and its associated demesne, including the Santa Maria area, to General Giacomo Trivulzio. Trivulzio had been sent by Milan to acquire the Misox and Calanca valleys and strengthen their claims. However, over the following years, he broke with Milan and allied with the Three Leagues. In the 1480 sale, the castle was not mentioned, meaning that it may have already been abandoned. The thick walls of the donjon allowed it to withstand centuries of neglect. The first restoration was in 1932–34, after which it was used as an observation tower. It was repaired again in 1979.

== Castle site ==
The castle is located on a hill above the village of Santa Maria in Calanca. The main village street passes by the parish church on its way to the castle. The large donjon is five-sided on the outside, while the interior is rectangular. In most places the walls are 2 m (6.6 ft) thick, but are up to 4 m (13 ft) thick in places. Fragments of the old residence tract are visible on the north end of the hilltop as is a small part of the old ring wall to the west.

== Church of the Assumption of St. Mary ==
The parish church of Assumption of St. Mary was first mentioned in 1219 and was the center of a parish that covered the entire valley. The choir was built in 1385 or 1416 and the nave extended in 1606. The Gothic bell tower is north of the choir and is topped with a Baroque octagonal pyramid spire. The west Tuscan style portico leads to the portal which is decorated with statues from 1626. The nave is decorated with a richly painted Renaissance ceiling from 1606. Above the choir, the cherubs hold the coats of arms of Calanca, the Gray League, Grono and San Vittore.

The original high altar, by Ivo Strigels in 1512, was moved to the Basel Historical Museum in 1887.

== Gallery ==
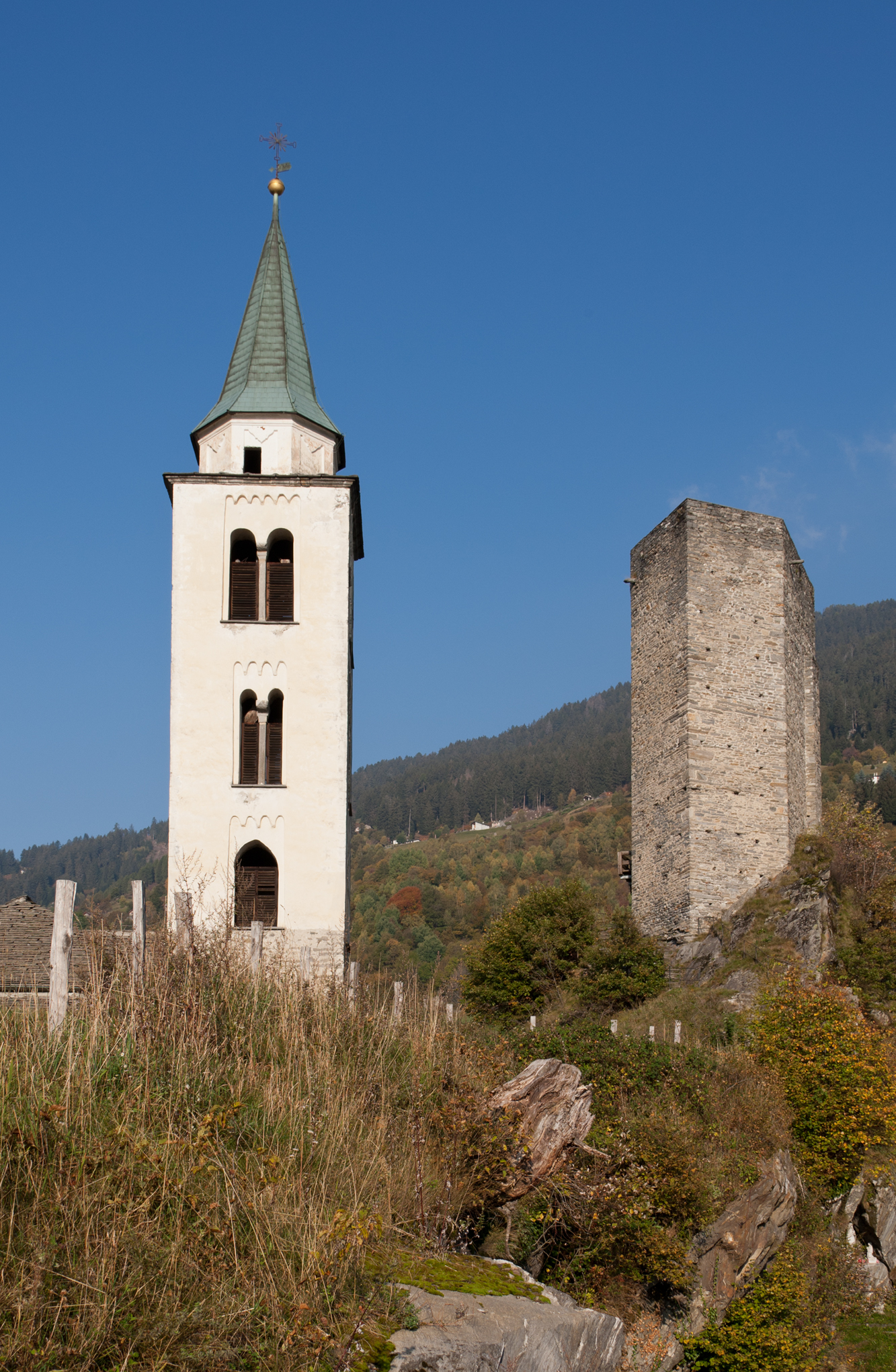
The castle tower and church

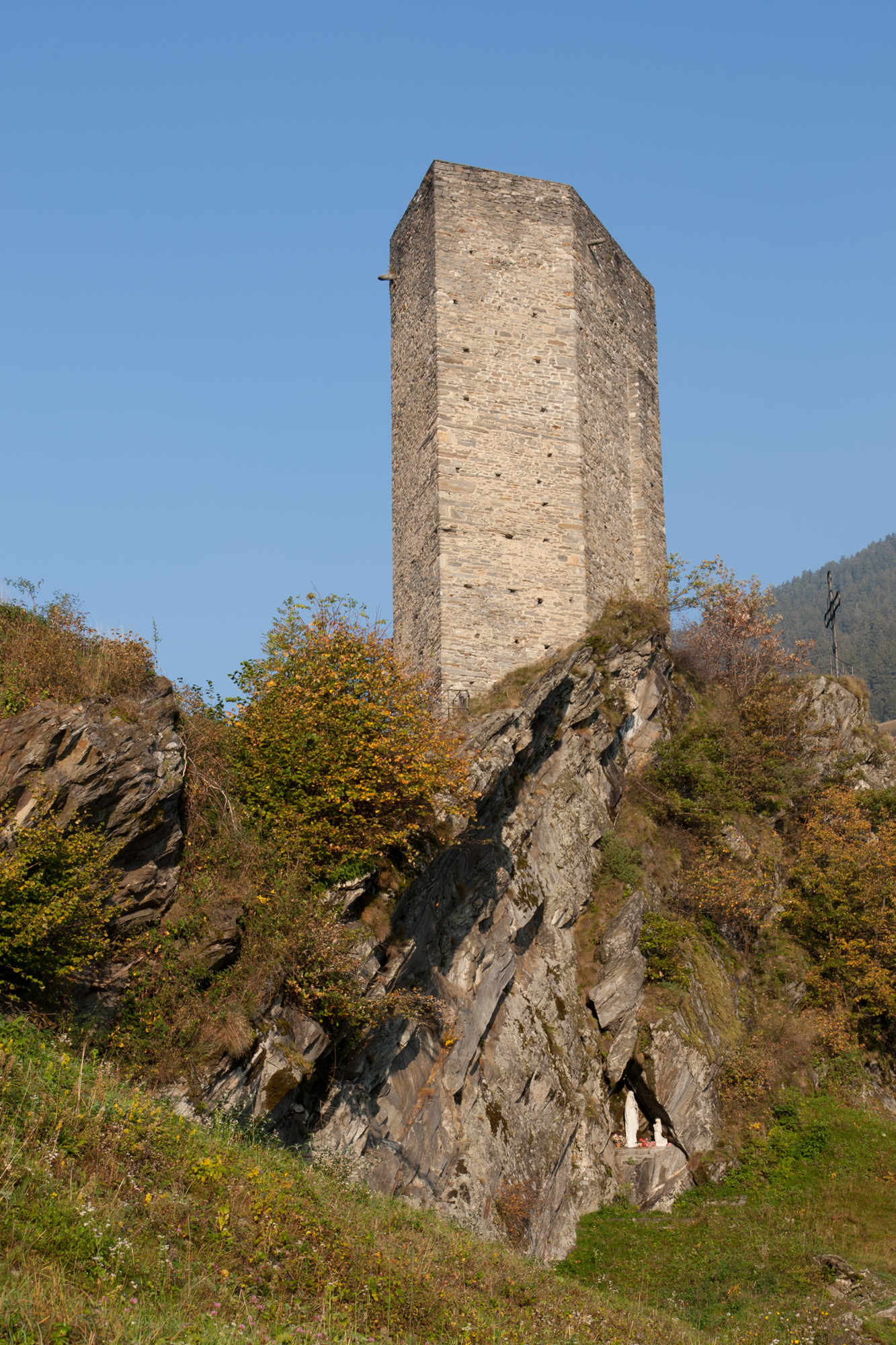
Santa Maria in Calanca Castle

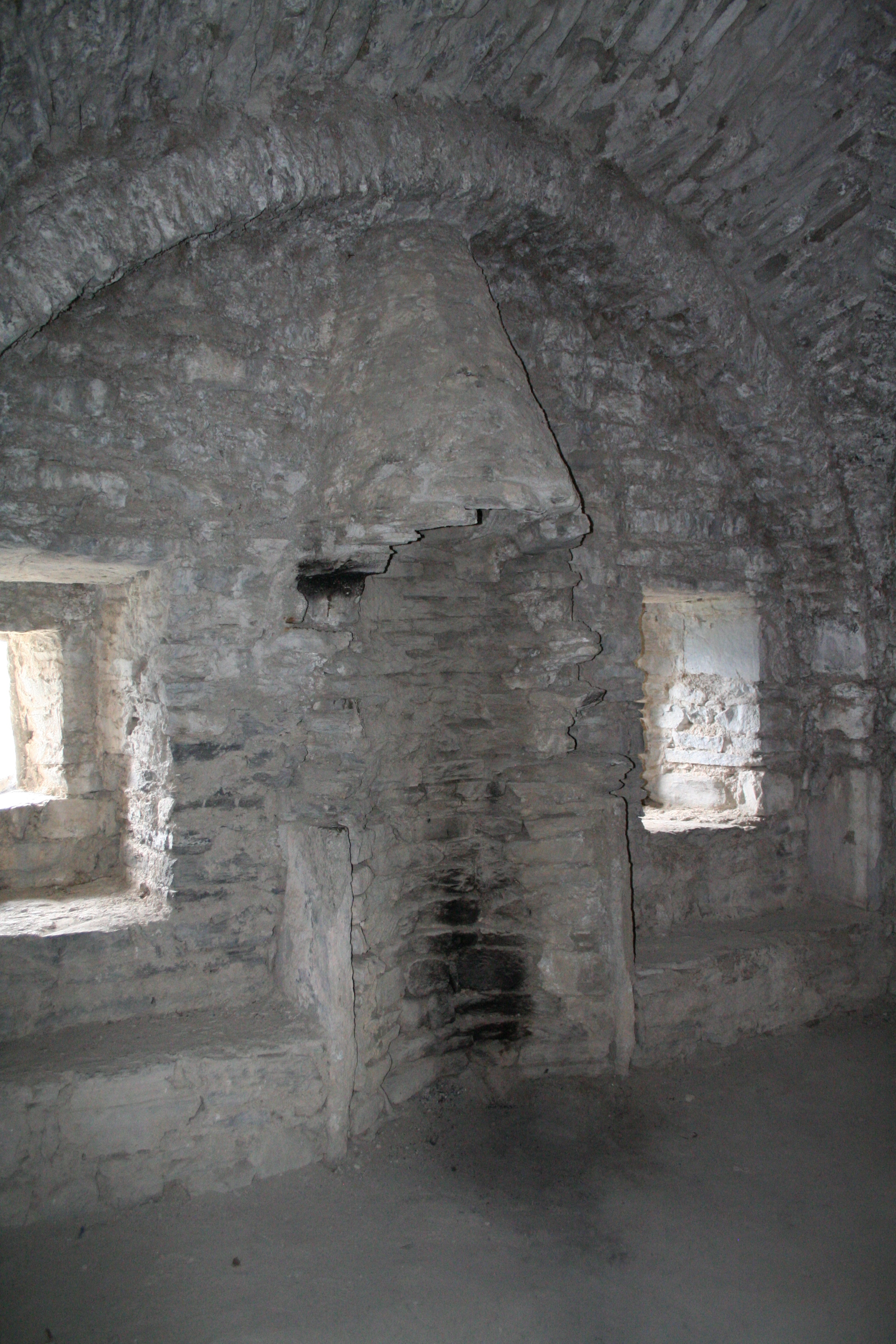
Oven in the castle

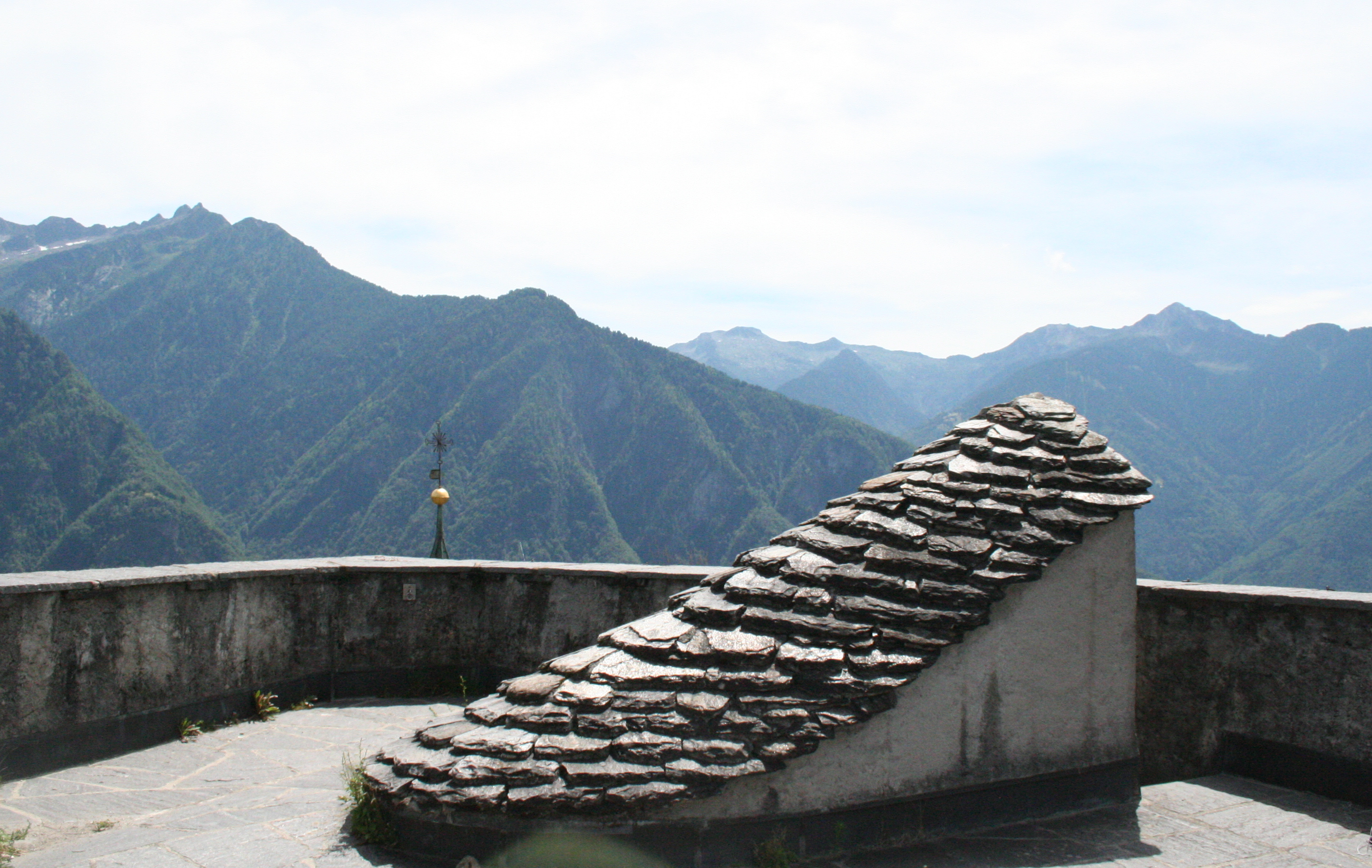
Roof of the castle

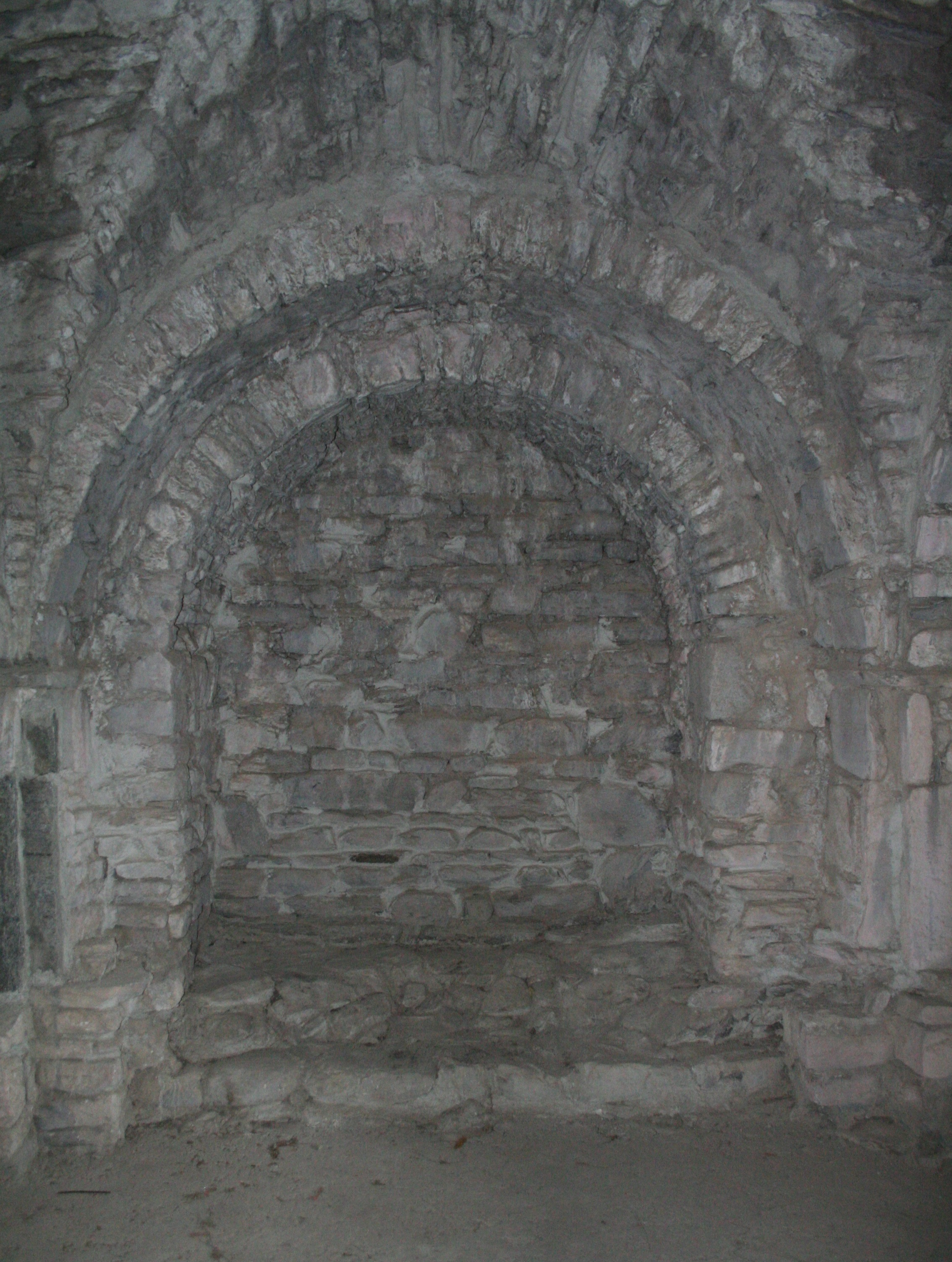
Interior room in the castle

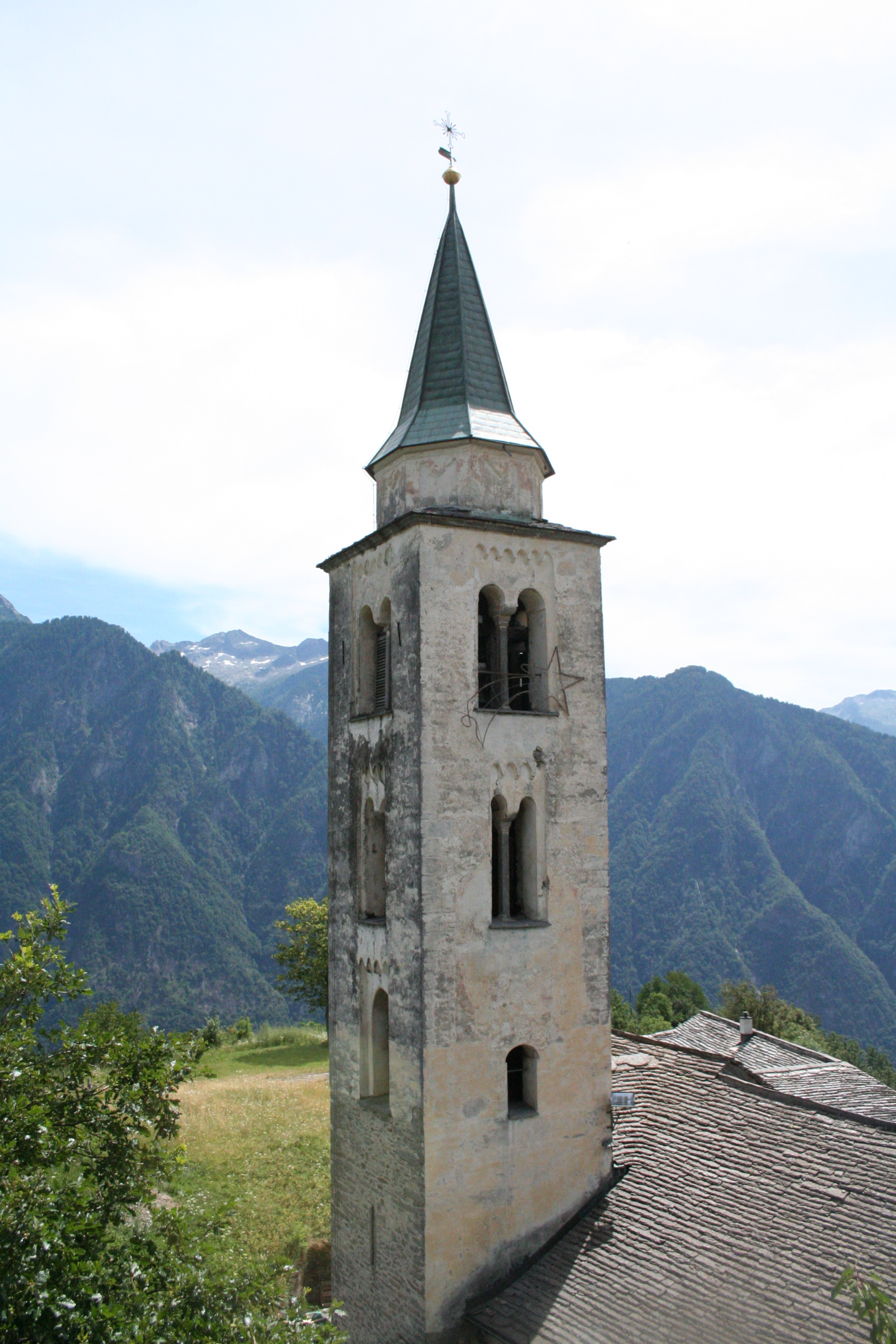
Tower of the church

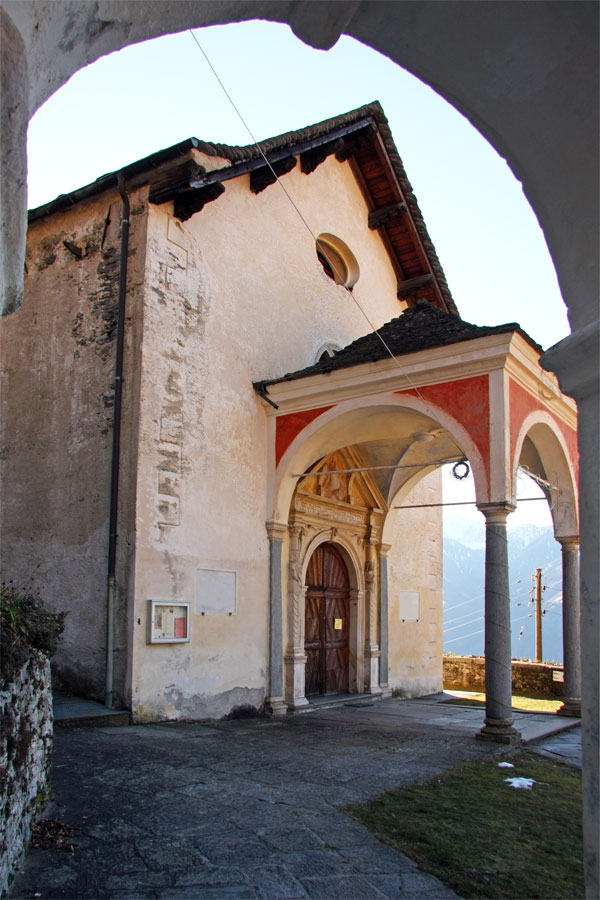
Portico and portal of the church

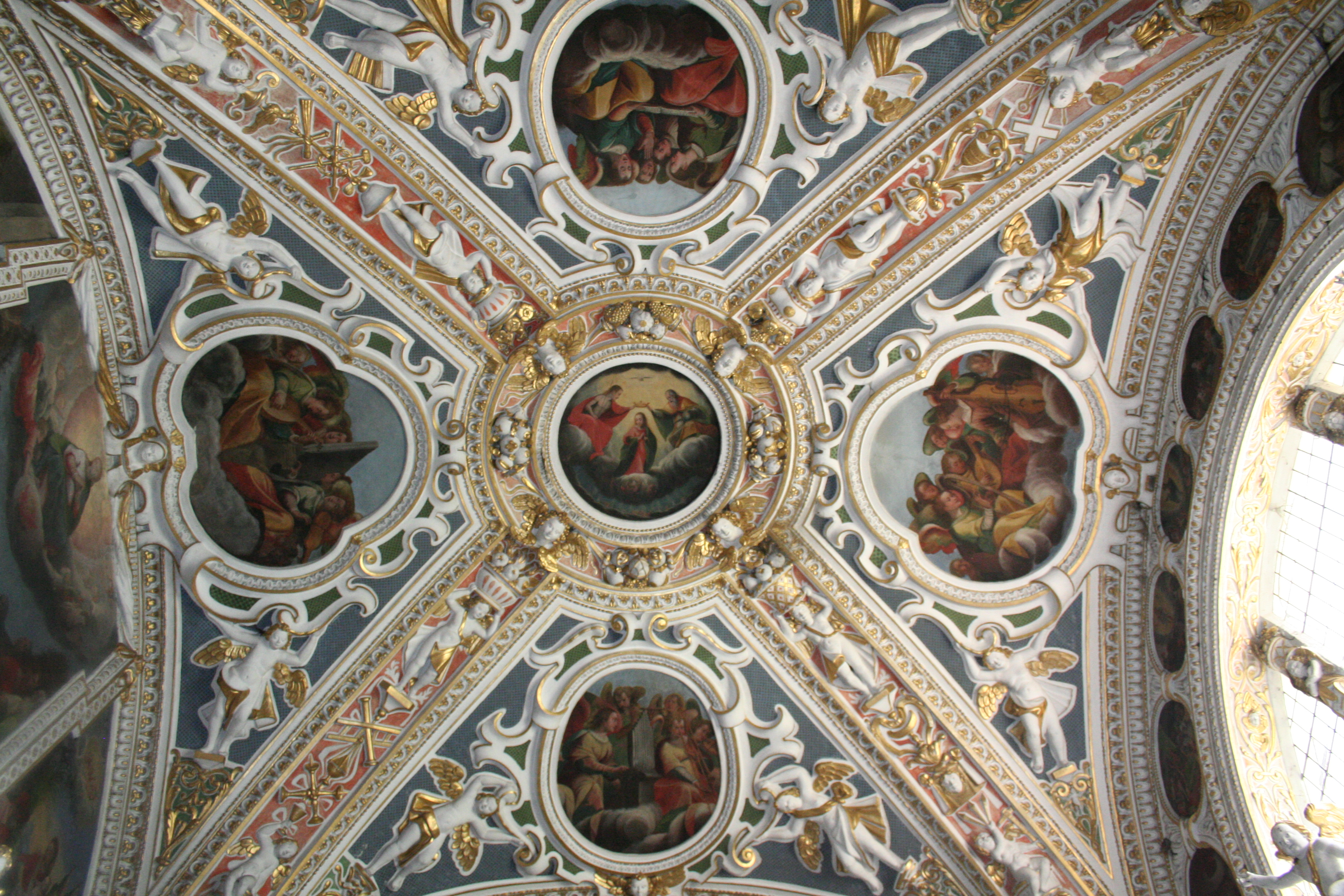
Choir ceiling in the church

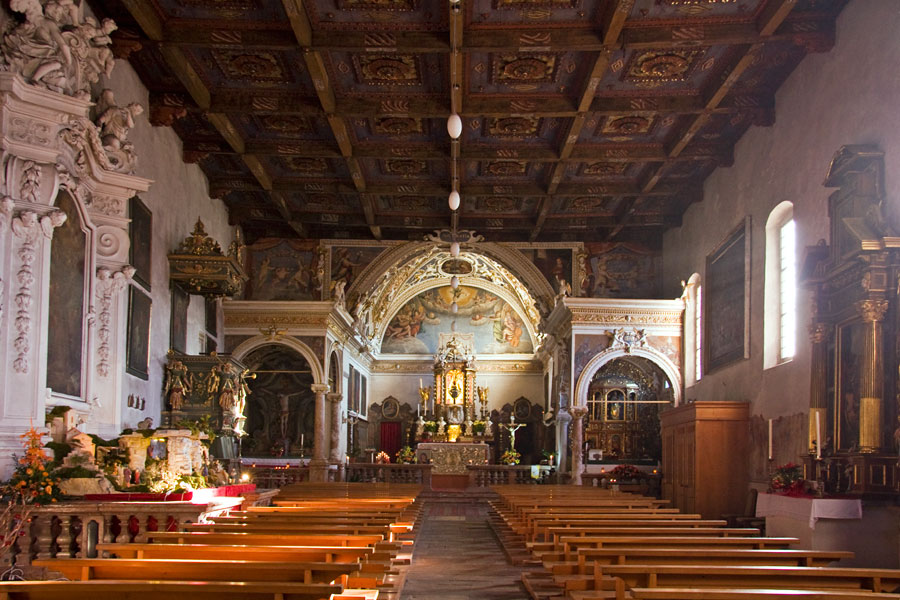
Interior of the church

== See also ==
- List of castles in Switzerland
