= Moesa District =

Former administrative district of Switzerland

Coordinates: 46°14′N 9°07′E

Moesa Distretto di Moesa
- District
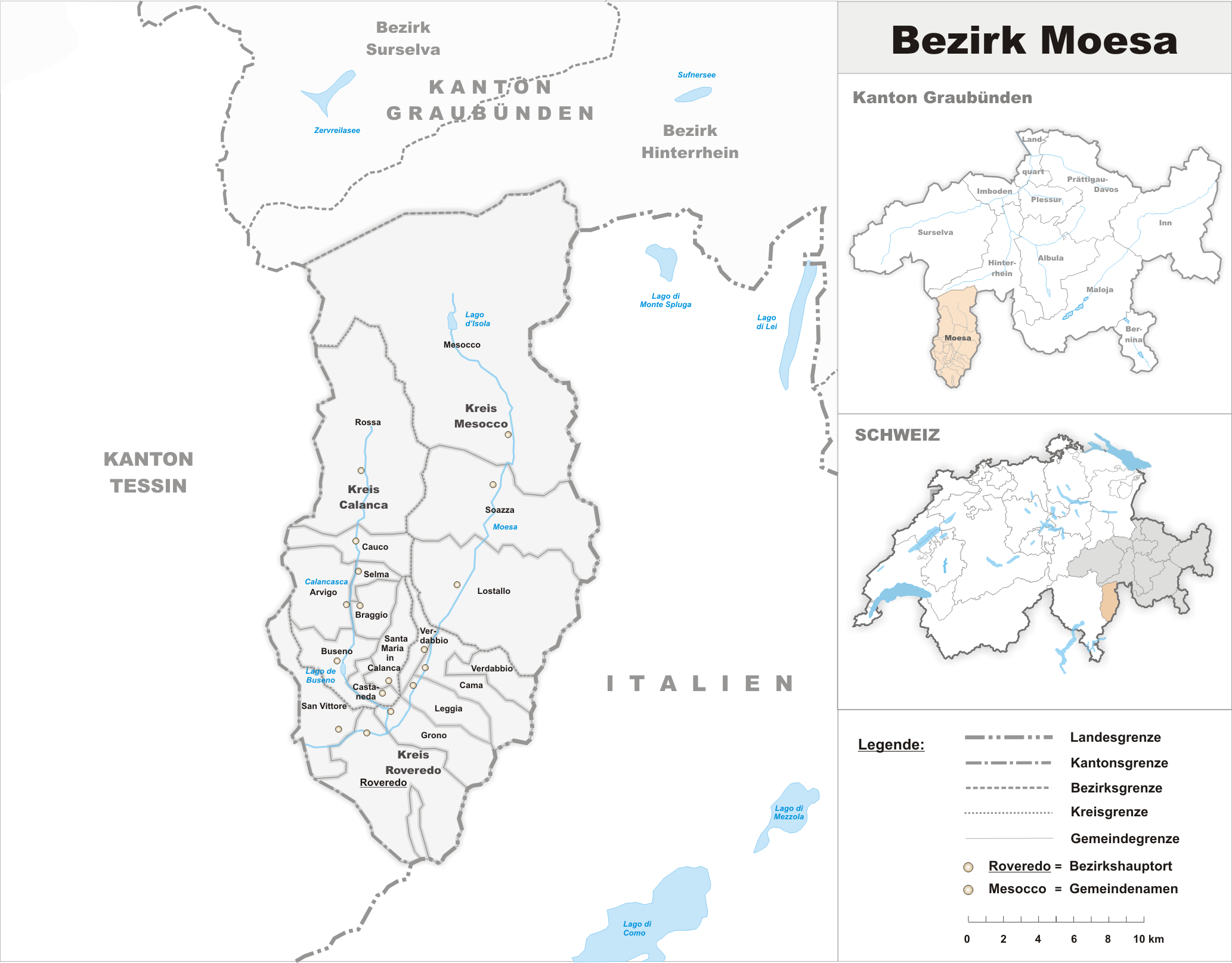
- Country: Switzerland
- Canton: Graubünden
- Capital: Roveredo

Area
  - Total: 473.74 km^{2} (182.91 sq mi)

Population (December 2015)
  - Total: 8,125
  - Density: 17.15/km^{2} (44.42/sq mi)
- Time zone: UTC+1 (CET)
  - Summer (DST): UTC+2 (CEST)
- Municipalities: 14

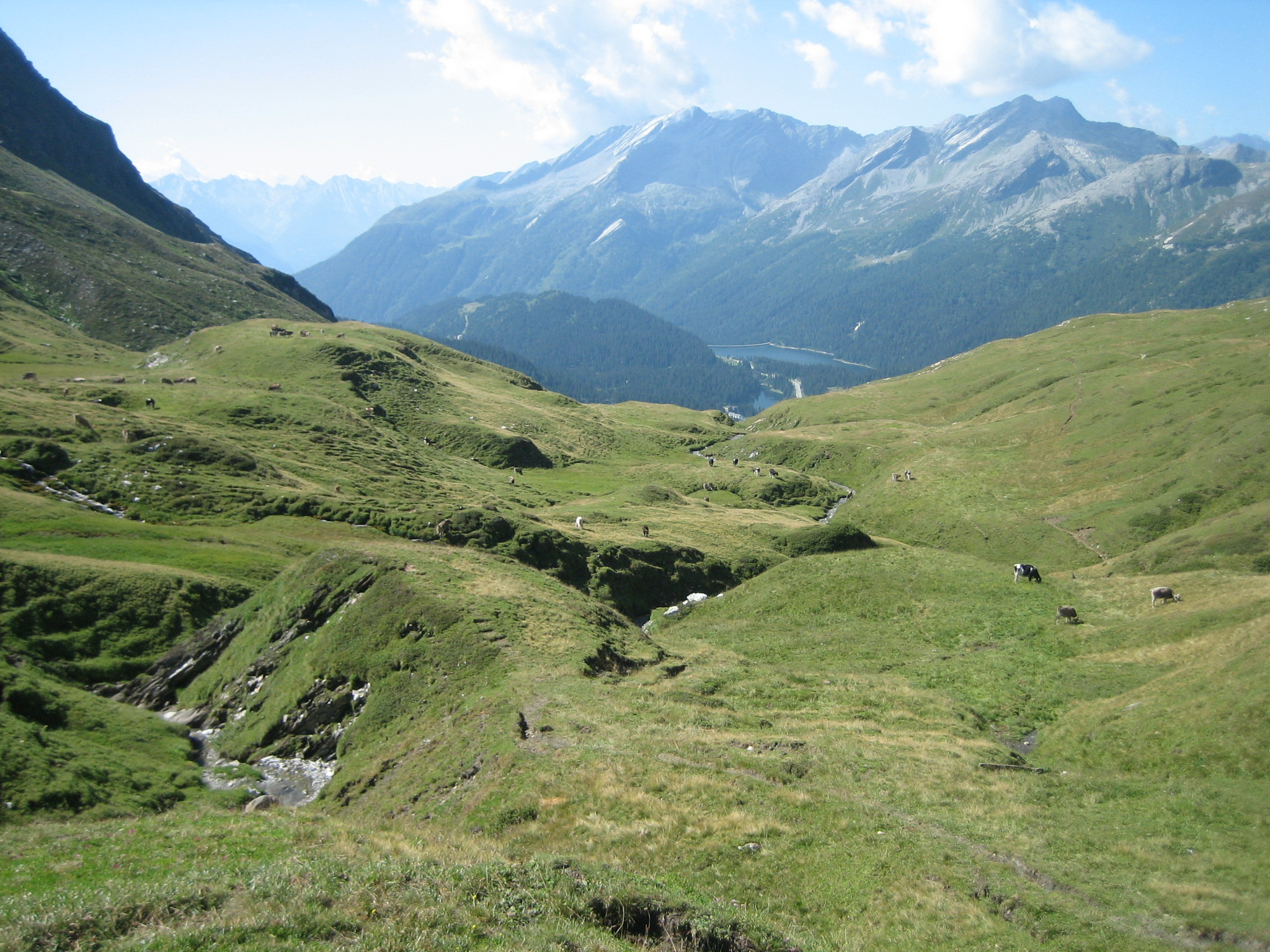
Moesa scenery

Moesa District, often referred to as Moesano, is a former administrative district in the canton of Graubünden, Switzerland. It had an official language of Italian, a population of 8,125 in 2015, and an area of 473.74 km^{2} (182.91 sq mi), corresponding to the Mesolcina valley along the eponymous Moesa River.

On 1 January 2015 the former municipalities of Arvigo, Braggio, Selma and Cauco merged to form the new municipality of Calanca.

The Moesa District was replaced with the Moesa Region on 1 January 2017 as part of a reorganization of the canton.

== Municipalities ==
It consisted of three Kreise (circles) and fourteen municipalities:

Calanca circle
Municipality	Population (31 December 2020)	Area (km^{2})
Buseno	91	11.26
Calanca	201	37.72
Castaneda	278	3.94
Rossa	151	58.93
Santa Maria in Calanca	115	9.32

Mesocco circle
Municipality	Population (31 December 2020)	Area (km^{2})
Lostallo	840	50.91
Mesocco	1,323	164.76
Soazza	324	46.37

Roveredo circle
Municipality	Population (31 December 2020)	Area (km^{2})
Cama	589	15.06
Grono	1,397	14.83
Leggia	138	9.15
Roveredo	2,597	38.78
San Vittore	864	22.03
Verdabbio	163	13.11

== Languages ==
The official language of Moesa is Italian, traditionally the Western Lombard dialect spoken by the native population.

Languages of Moesa District, GR
Languages	Census 2000	
Languages	Number	Percent
German	528	7.1%
Romansh	10	0.1%
Italian	6,578	88.0%
TOTAL	7,471	100%
