= Puntone dei Fraciòn =

Mountain in Switzerland

- Location within Switzerland

Highest point
- Elevation: 3,202 m (10,505 ft)
- Prominence: 157 m (515 ft)
- Parent peak: Vogelberg
- Coordinates: 46°28′15.7″N 9°5′6.5″E

Geography
- Location: Ticino/Graubünden, Switzerland
- Parent range: Lepontine Alps

Puntone dei Fraciòn is a 3,202-metre-high mountain in the Lepontine Alps, located on the border between the Swiss cantons of Ticino and Graubünden. It is the highest peak of the Calanca valley (Graubünden). On its west side (Ticino) it overlooks the valley of Malvaglia. It lies approximately halfway between the Vogelberg and the Zapporthorn.
