= Marscholhorn =

Mountain in Switzerland

- Piz Moesola
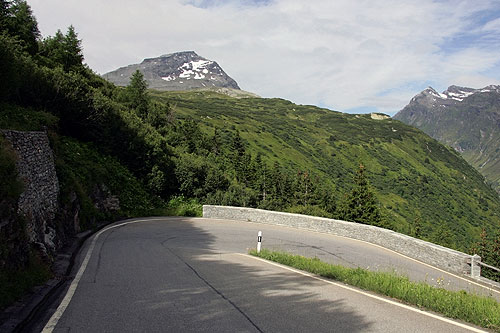
- Marscholhorn (left peak) from the San Bernardino road

Highest point
- Elevation: 2,970 m (9,740 ft)
- Prominence: 86 m (282 ft)
- Parent peak: Rheinwaldhorn
- Coordinates: 46°29′34.1″N 9°8′17.3″E

Geography
- Location within Switzerland
- Location: Graubünden, Switzerland
- Parent range: Lepontine Alps

The Marscholhorn (also known as Piz Moesola) is a mountain of the Swiss Lepontine Alps, overlooking the San Bernardino Pass in the canton of Graubünden. It lies at the eastern end of the range between the Hinterrhein valley and the Mesolcina, east of the Zapporthorn.
