= Braggio =

- Former municipality
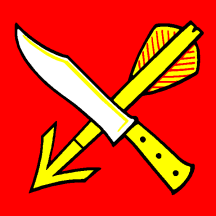
- Flag Coat of arms
- Location of Braggio
- Location within Switzerland Location within Canton of Graubünden
- Coordinates: 46°18′N 9°7′E
- Country: Switzerland
- Canton: Graubünden
- District: Moesa

Government
  - Mayor: Agnese Berta

Area
  - Total: 6.91 km^{2} (2.67 sq mi)
- Elevation: 1,298 m (4,259 ft)

Population (Dec 2013)
  - Total: 51
  - Density: 7.4/km^{2} (19/sq mi)
- Time zone: UTC+01:00 (CET)
  - Summer (DST): UTC+02:00 (CEST)
- Postal code: 6544
- SFOS number: 3803
- ISO 3166 code: CH-GR
- Surrounded by: Arvigo, Buseno, Santa Maria in Calanca, Selma
- Twin towns: Dietikon (Switzerland)
- Website: www.braggio.ch

Braggio was a municipality in the district of Moesa in the Swiss canton of Graubünden. On 1 January 2015 the former municipalities of Arvigo, Braggio, Cauco and Selma merged to form the new municipality of Calanca.

== History ==
Braggio is first mentioned in 1419 as Bragio. It was part of the old municipality of Calanca until 1851 when it became an independent municipality.

== Geography ==
Before the merger, Braggio had a total area of 6.9 km^{2} (2.7 mi^{2}). Of this area, 9.6% is used for agricultural purposes, while 67.2% is forested. Of the rest of the land, 0.9% is settled (buildings or roads) and the remainder (22.4%) is non-productive (rivers, glaciers or mountains).

The former municipality is located in the Calanca sub-district of the Moesa district on the left side of the Val Calanca. It is on a high meadow at an elevation of 1,320 m (4,330 ft) and can only be reached via a cable car (since 1961) or a narrow footpath.

== Demographics ==
Braggio had a population (as of 2013) of 51. As of 2008, 6.6% of the population was made up of foreign nationals. Over the last 10 years the population has decreased at a rate of -17.6%. Most of the population (as of 2000) speaks Italian (77.4%), with German being second most common (17.7%) and French being third ( 4.8%).

As of 2000, the gender distribution of the population was 46.4% male and 53.6% female. The age distribution, as of 2000, in Braggio is; 8 children or 12.9% of the population are between 0 and 9 years old. 7 teenagers or 11.3% are 10 to 14, and 1 teenager is 15 to 19. Of the adult population, 1 person is between 20 and 29 years old. 5 people or 8.1% of the population are 30 to 39, 16 people or 25.8% are 40 to 49, and 8 people or 12.9% are 50 to 59. The senior population distribution is 6 people or 9.7% of the population are between 60 and 69 years old, 5 people or 8.1% are 70 to 79, there are 5 people or 8.1% who are 80 to 89.

In the 2007 federal election the most popular party was the SP which received 47.4% of the vote. The next three most popular parties were the CVP (43.9%), the SVP (8.8%) and the FDP (0%).

The entire Swiss population is generally well educated. In Braggio about 56.7% of the population (between age 25-64) have completed either non-mandatory upper secondary education or additional higher education (either university or a Fachhochschule).

Braggio has an unemployment rate of 1.23%. As of 2005, there were 13 people employed in the primary economic sector and about 6 businesses involved in this sector. 6 people are employed in the secondary sector and there are 2 businesses in this sector. 2 people are employed in the tertiary sector, with 1 business in this sector.

The historical population is given in the following table:

| year | population |
|---|---|
| 1850 | 123 |
| 1900 | 108 |
| 1950 | 98 |
| 1990 | 54 |
| 2000 | 62 |

== Weather ==
Braggio has an average of 97.4 days of rain per year and on average receives 1,645 mm (64.8 in) of precipitation. The wettest month is May during which time Braggio receives an average of 204 mm (8.0 in) of precipitation. During this month there is precipitation for an average of 12 days. The driest month of the year is December with an average of 55 mm (2.2 in) of precipitation over 12 days.
