= Calanca =

- Municipality
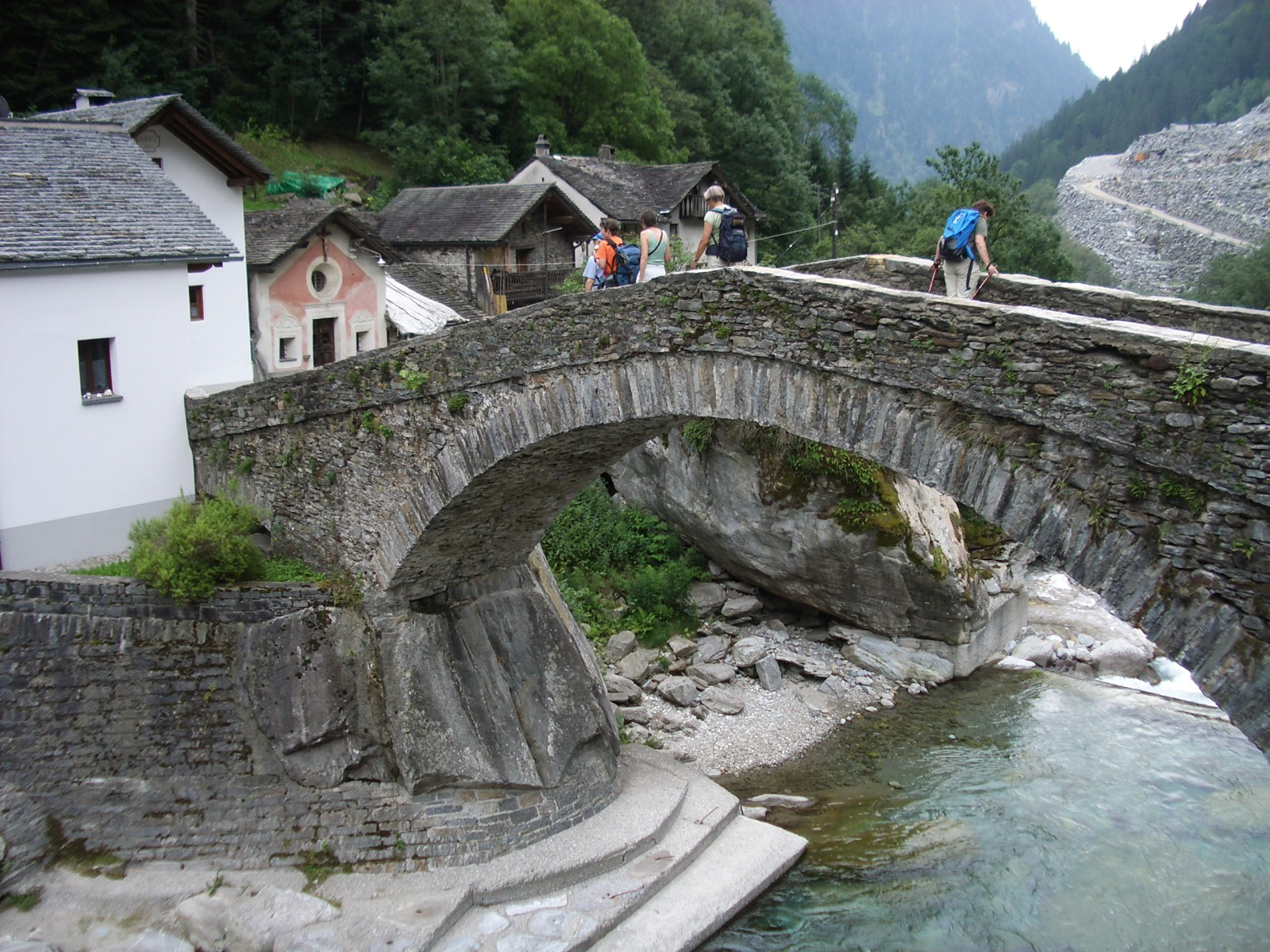
- Stone bridge in Arvigo village in Calanca

- Flag Coat of arms
- Location of Calanca
- Location within Switzerland Location within Canton of Grisons
- Coordinates: 46°18′N 9°7′E
- Country: Switzerland
- Canton: Grisons
- District: Moesa

Area
  - Total: 37.73 km^{2} (14.57 sq mi)

Population (Dec 2013)
  - Total: 206
  - Density: 5.46/km^{2} (14.1/sq mi)
- Time zone: UTC+01:00 (CET)
  - Summer (DST): UTC+02:00 (CEST)
- Postal code: 6543-6546
- SFOS number: 3837
- ISO 3166 code: CH-GR
- Surrounded by: Buseno, Santa Maria in Calanca
- Website: http://www.comunedicalanca.ch SFSO statistics

Calanca is a municipality in the Moesa Region in the Swiss canton of the Grisons. On 1 January 2015 the former municipalities of Arvigo, Braggio, Cauco and Selma merged to form the new municipality of Calanca.

== History ==
Arvigo is first mentioned in 1453 as Arvicho.

Braggio is first mentioned in 1419 as Bragio. It was part of the old municipality of Calanca until 1851 when it became an independent municipality.

The church at Cauco is first mentioned in 1497. The village was part of the Squadra di Calanca until 1851 when it became an independent municipality.

The village that became Selma was part of the Squadra di Calanca until 1796. Between 1796 and 1851 it was part of the Calanca interiore municipality. It was first called Selma in 1812, but it wasn't until 1851 that it became an independent political municipality.

== Geography ==
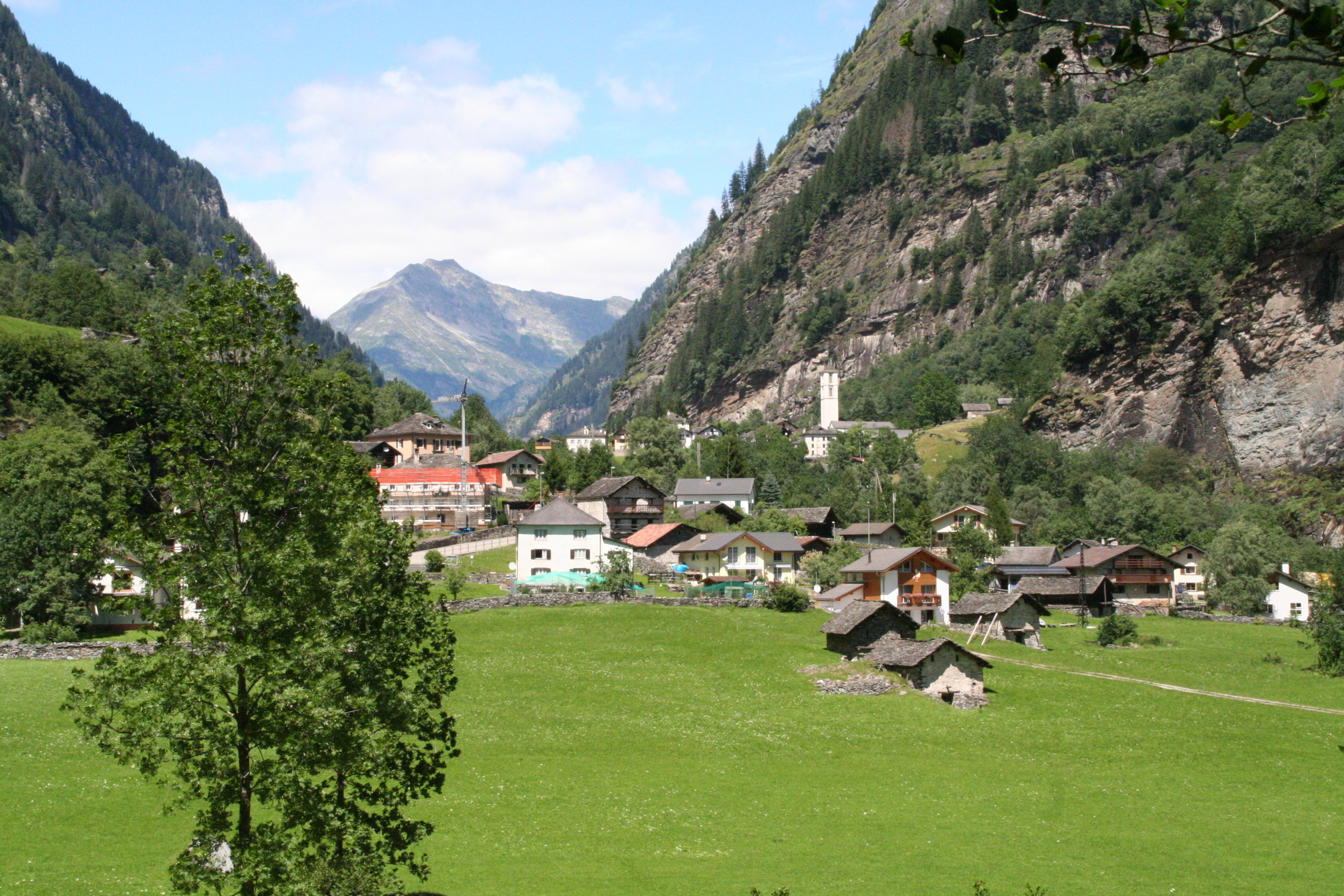
Bodio village and surrounding mountains in Calanca

Based on the 2009 survey, the former municipalities that make up Calanca had an area of 37.72 km^{2} (14.56 sq mi). Of this area, 3.83 km^{2} (1.48 mi^{2}) or 10.2% was used for agricultural purposes, while 21.69 km^{2} (8.37 mi^{2}) or 57.5% was forested. Of the rest of the land, 0.75 km^{2} (0.29 mi^{2}) or 2.0% was settled (buildings or roads), 0.39 km^{2} (0.15 mi^{2}) or 1.0% was either rivers or lakes and 11.01 km^{2} (4.25 mi^{2}) or 29.2% was unproductive land. Of the built up area, housing and buildings made up 0.7% and transportation infrastructure made up 0.7%. Out of the forested land, 48.7% of the total land area is heavily forested and 3.5% is covered with orchards or small clusters of trees. Of the agricultural land, 3.4% is pastures and 6.8% is used for alpine pastures. All the water in the municipality is flowing water. Of the unproductive areas, 12.7% is unproductive vegetation and 16.5% is too rocky for vegetation.

== Demographics ==
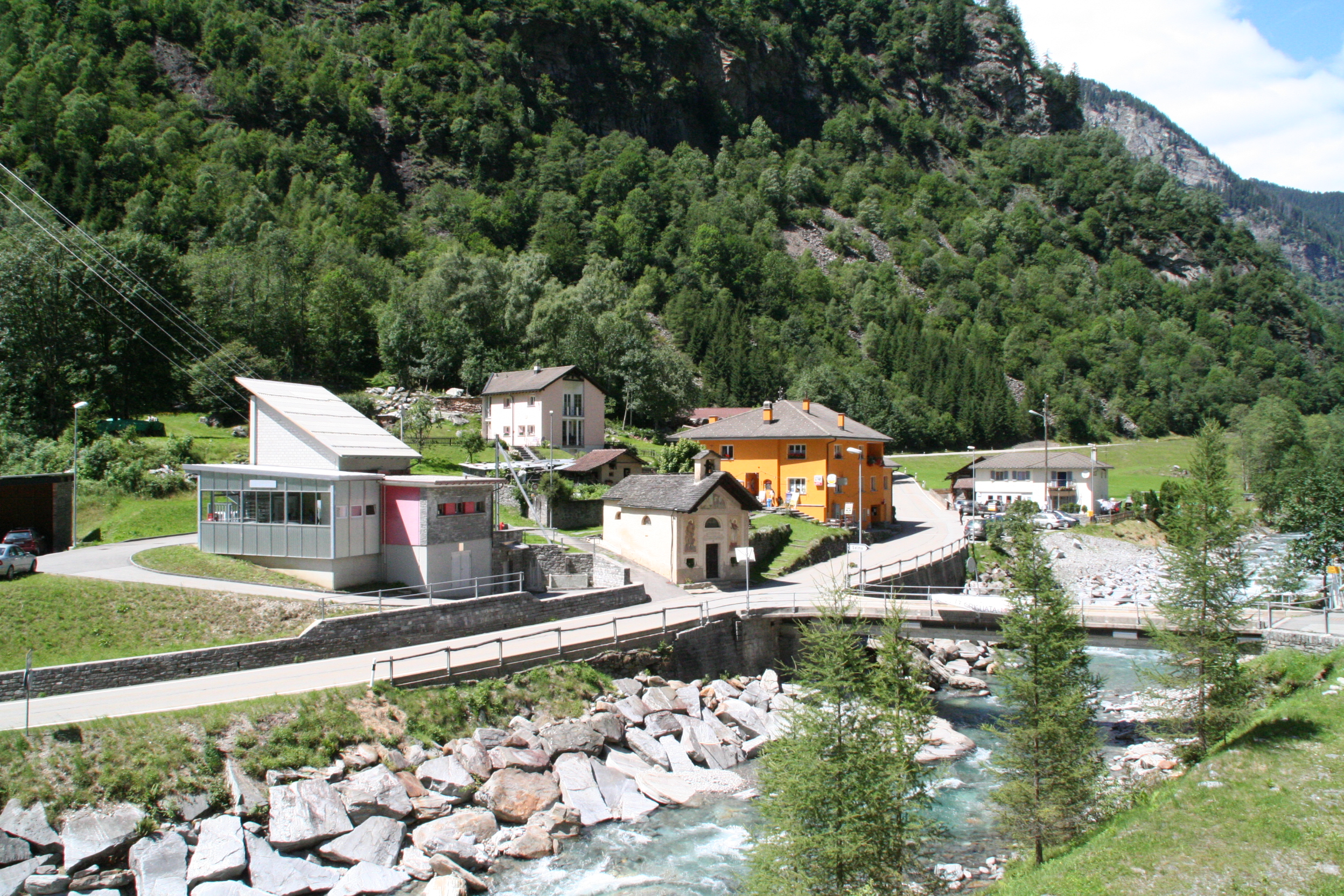
Selma village and cable car

The total population of Calanca (as of December 2020) is 201.

== Historic population ==
The historical population is given in the following chart:

== Sights ==
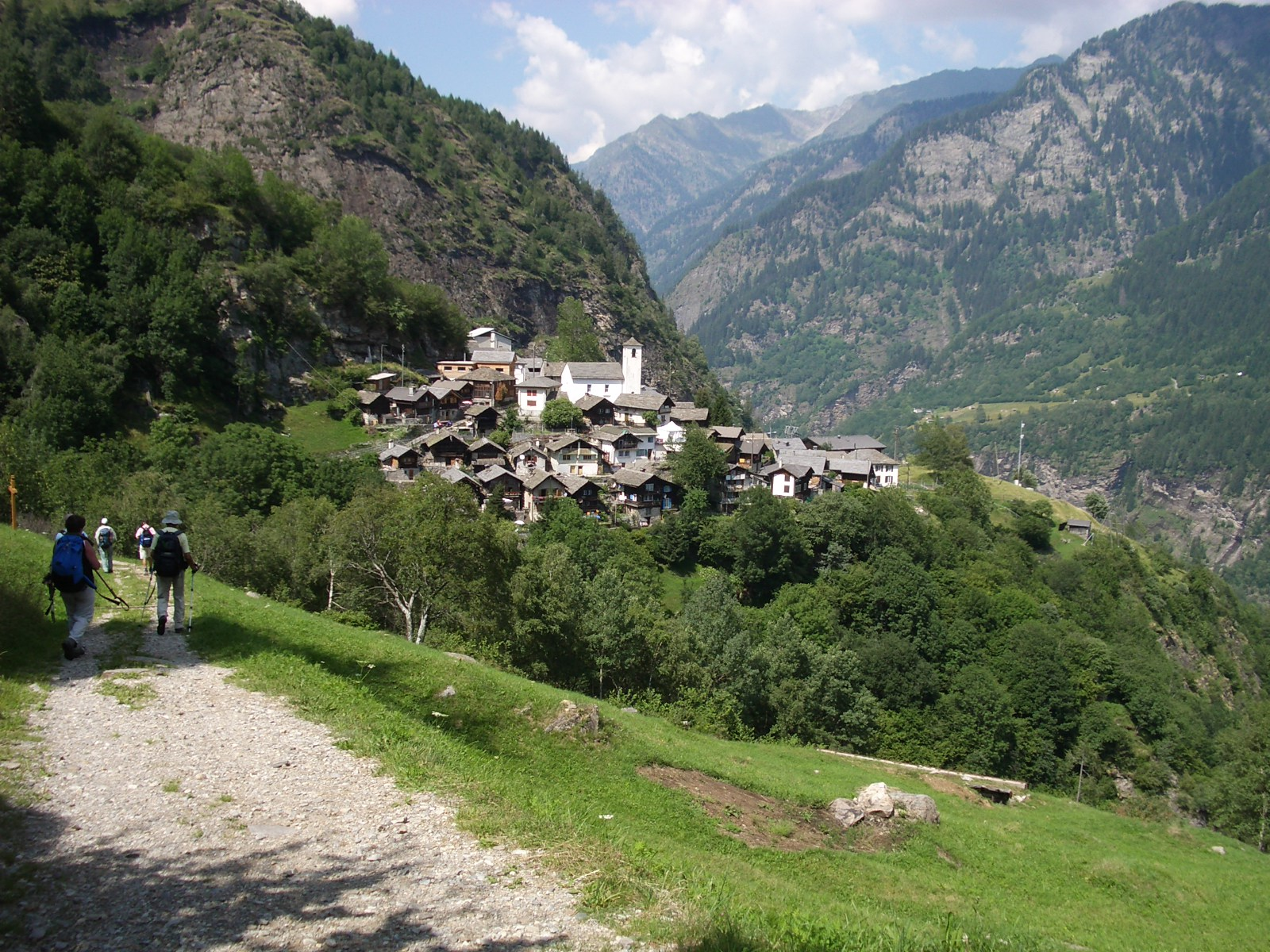
The car-free Landarenca village and surrounding hiking trails

The villages of Landarenca, Braggio and Bodio / Cauco are all part of the Inventory of Swiss Heritage Sites.

== Weather ==
Braggio has an average of 97.4 days of rain per year and on average receives 1,645 mm (64.8 in) of precipitation. The wettest month is May during which time Braggio receives an average of 204 mm (8.0 in) of precipitation. During this month there is precipitation for an average of 12 days. The driest month of the year is December with an average of 55 mm (2.2 in) of precipitation over 12 days.

== Notable people ==
- Roger Sablonier (1941–2010), Swiss historian and writer, University of Zürich faculty
