= Arvigo =

- Former municipality
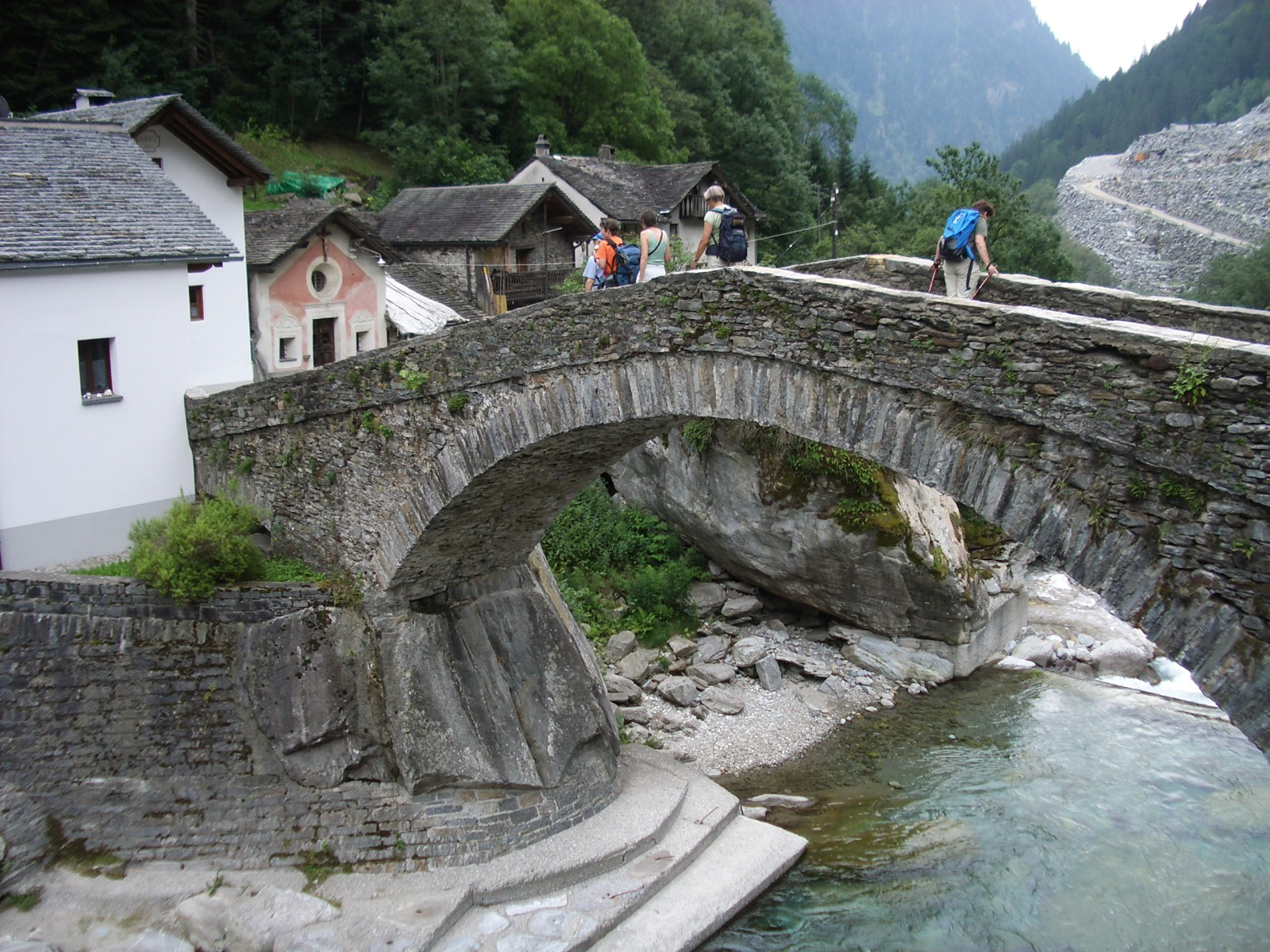

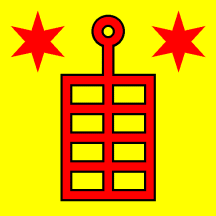
- Flag Coat of arms
- Location of Arvigo
- Location within Switzerland Location within Canton of Graubünden
- Coordinates: 46°18′N 9°6′E
- Country: Switzerland
- Canton: Graubünden
- District: Moesa

Government
  - Mayor: Raimondo Denicolà

Area
  - Total: 17.01 km^{2} (6.57 sq mi)
- Elevation: 876 m (2,874 ft)

Population (Dec 2013)
  - Total: 87
  - Density: 5.1/km^{2} (13/sq mi)
- Time zone: UTC+01:00 (CET)
  - Summer (DST): UTC+02:00 (CEST)
- Postal code: 6543
- SFOS number: 3801
- ISO 3166 code: CH-GR
- Surrounded by: Braggio, Buseno, Cauco, Cresciano (TI), Osogna (TI), San Vittore, Selma
- Website: www.arvigo.ch

Arvigo is a former municipality in the district of Moesa in the south of the Swiss canton of Graubünden, next to Ticino. On 1 January 2015 the former municipalities of Arvigo, Braggio, Cauco and Selma merged to form the new municipality of Calanca.

== History ==
Arvigo is first mentioned in 1453 as Arvicho.

== Geography ==
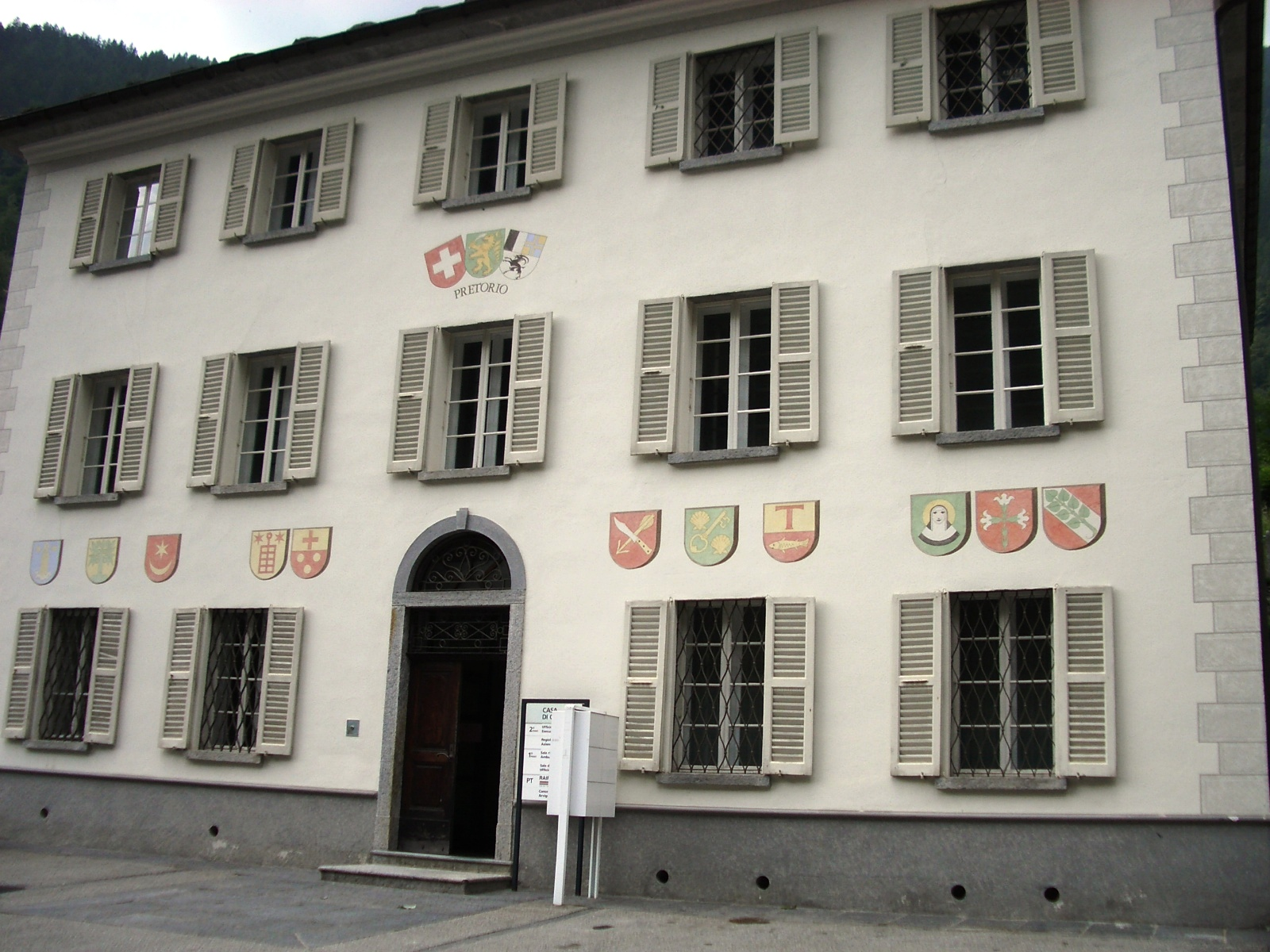
Local District Court of the Calanca district

Before the merger, Arvigo had a total area of 17.0 km^{2} (6.6 mi^{2}). Of this area, 11.9% is used for agricultural purposes, while 53.4% is forested. Of the rest of the land, 1.5% is settled (buildings or roads) and the remainder (33.1%) is non-productive (rivers, glaciers or mountains).

The former municipality is located in the Calanca sub-district of the Moesa district. It is the capital of the Val Calanca and also home to the local District Court. It consists of the village of Arvigo and since 1980 the hamlets of Landarenca.

== Demographics ==
Arvigo had a population (as of 2013) of 87. As of 2008, 29.5% of the population was made up of foreign nationals. Over the last 10 years the population has decreased at a rate of -8.8%. Most of the population (as of 2000) speaks Italian (78.3%), with German being second most common (10.9%) and Portuguese being third ( 5.4%).

As of 2000, the gender distribution of the population was 54.8% male and 45.2% female. The age distribution, as of 2000, in Arvigo is; 4 children or 4.3% of the population are between 0 and 9 years old. 2 teenagers or 2.2% are 10 to 14, and no one is between 15 and 19. Of the adult population, 12 people or 13.0% of the population are between 20 and 29 years old. 19 people or 20.7% are 30 to 39, 7 people or 7.6% are 40 to 49, and 9 people or 9.8% are 50 to 59. The senior population distribution is 15 people or 16.3% of the population are between 60 and 69 years old, 15 people or 16.3% are 70 to 79, there are 6 people or 6.5% who are 80 to 89, and there are 3 people or 3.3% who are 90 to 99.

In the 2007 federal election the most popular party was the SVP which received 41.9% of the vote. The next three most popular parties were the CVP (22.6%), the SP (20%) and the FDP (15.5%).

The entire Swiss population is generally well educated. In Arvigo about 53.1% of the population (between age 25-64) have completed either non-mandatory upper secondary education or additional higher education (either university or a Fachhochschule).

Arvigo has an unemployment rate of 1.85%. As of 2005, there were 11 people employed in the primary economic sector and about 3 businesses involved in this sector. 89 people are employed in the secondary sector and there are 5 businesses in this sector. 9 people are employed in the tertiary sector, with 4 businesses in this sector.

The historical population is given in the following table:

year	population
1691	400
1733	352
1850	110
1900	226
1950	152
1960	131
1970	150
1980	112
1990	115
2000	92^{a}
2010	97

^a includes Landarenca village

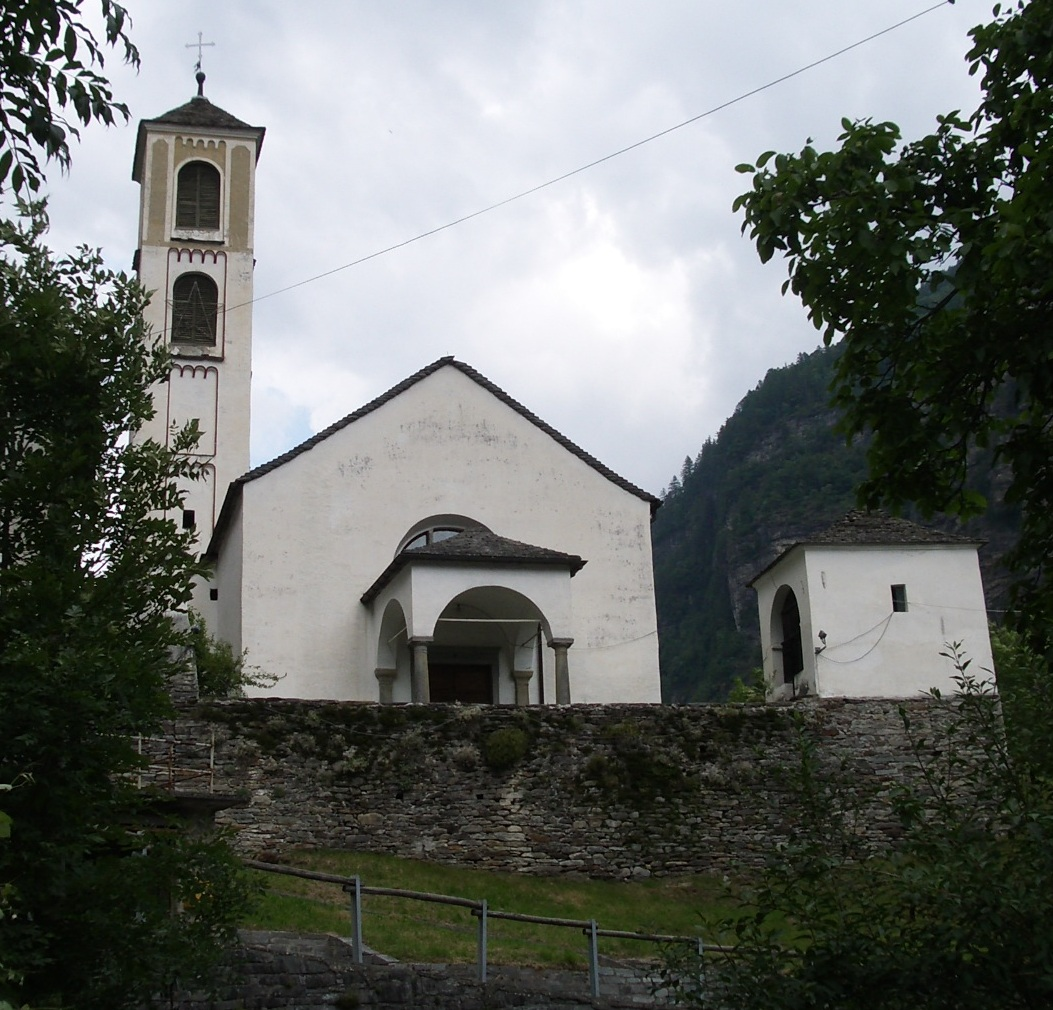
Church of San Lorenzo, first mentioned in 1453

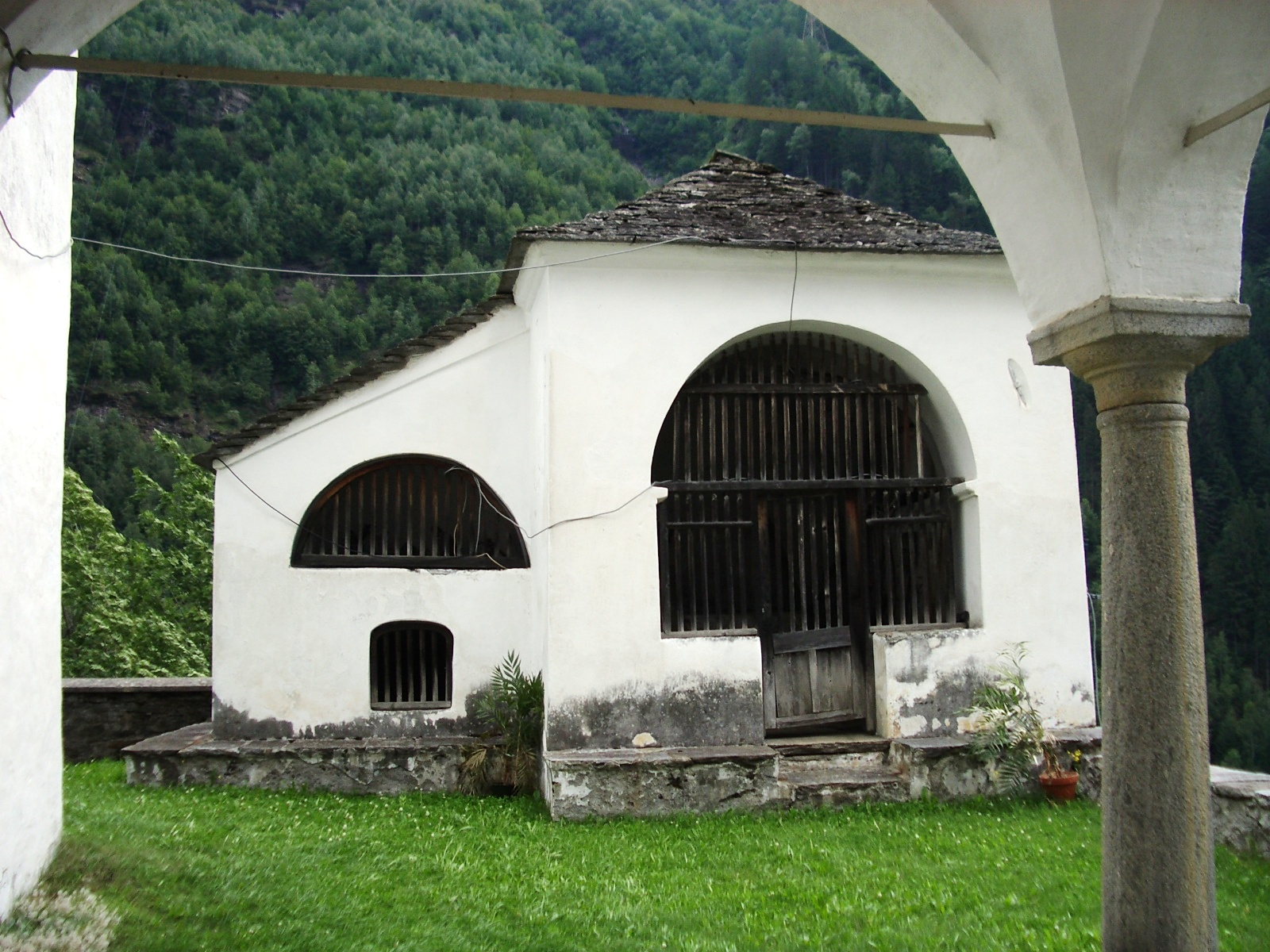
Ossuary
