= Cauco =

- Former municipality
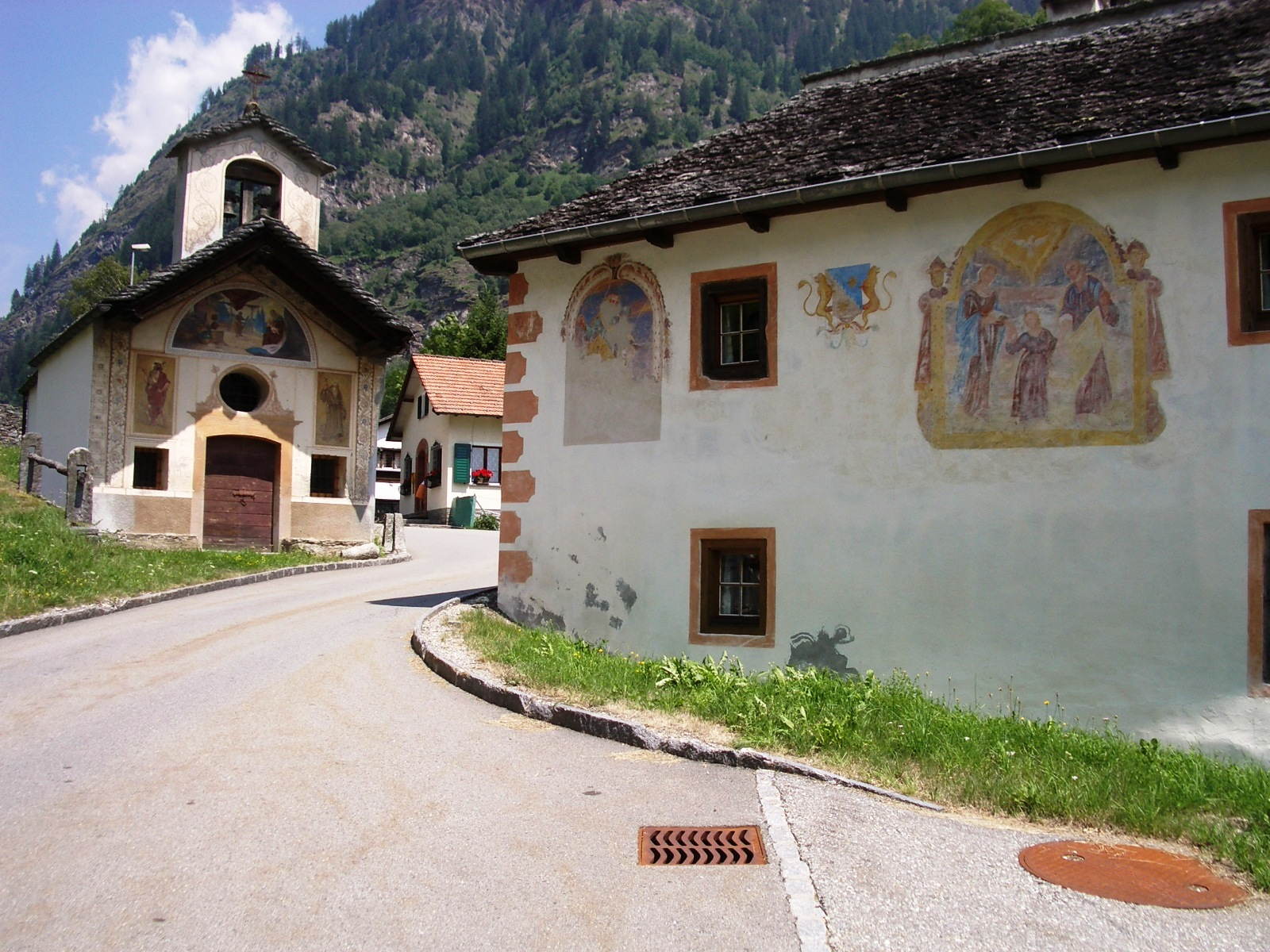

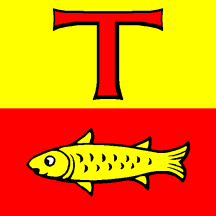
- Flag Coat of arms
- Location of Cauco
- Location within Switzerland Location within Canton of Graubünden
- Coordinates: 46°20′N 9°7′E
- Country: Switzerland
- Canton: Graubünden
- District: Moesa

Area
  - Total: 10.89 km^{2} (4.20 sq mi)
- Elevation: 992 m (3,255 ft)

Population (Dec 2013)
  - Total: 35
  - Density: 3.2/km^{2} (8.3/sq mi)
- Time zone: UTC+01:00 (CET)
  - Summer (DST): UTC+02:00 (CEST)
- Postal code: 6546
- SFOS number: 3806
- ISO 3166 code: CH-GR
- Localities: Cauco, Bodio, Lasciallo, Masciadone
- Surrounded by: Arvigo, Biasca (TI), Lostallo, Osogna (GR), Rossa, Santa Maria in Calanca, Selma, Soazza, Verdabbio
- Website: www.comunedicalanca.ch

Cauco is a former municipality in the district of Moesa in the Swiss canton of Graubünden. On 1 January 2015 the former municipalities of Arvigo, Braggio, Cauco and Selma merged to form the new municipality of Calanca.

== History ==
The church at Cauco is first mentioned in 1497. The village was part of the Squadra di Calanca until 1851 when it became an independent municipality.

== Geography ==
Before the merger, Cauco had a total area of 10.9 km^{2} (4.2 mi^{2}). Of this area, 8.8% is used for agricultural purposes, while 49.5% is forested. Of the rest of the land, 1.6% is settled (buildings or roads) and the remainder (40.1%) is non-productive (rivers, glaciers or mountains).

The former municipality is located in the Calanca sub-district of the Moesa district. It is located on the left bank of the Calancasca river at an elevation of 1,132 meters (3,714 ft). It is on a scree slope from a prehistoric rock slide. It consists of the village of Cauco and the hamlets of Lasciallo, Masciadone and Bodio (GR).

== Demographics ==
Cauco had a population (as of 2013) of 35. As of 2008, 2.8% of the population was made up of foreign nationals. Over the last 10 years the population has decreased at a rate of -4.9%. Most of the population (as of 2000) speaks Italian (73.0%), with German being second most common (24.3%) and French being third ( 2.7%).

As of 2000, the gender distribution of the population was 51.3% male and 48.7% female. The age distribution, as of 2000, in Cauco is; 1 child is between 0 and 9 years old. There are no teenagers who are 10 to 14, and 4 teenagers or 10.8% of the population who are 15 to 19. Of the adult population, 3 people or 8.1% of the population are between 20 and 29 years old. 4 people or 10.8% are 30 to 39, 3 people or 8.1% are 40 to 49, and 6 people or 16.2% are 50 to 59. The senior population distribution is 5 people or 13.5% of the population are between 60 and 69 years old, 6 people or 16.2% are 70 to 79, there are 4 people or 10.8% who are 80 to 89, and there is 1 person who is 90 to 99.

In the 2007 federal election the most popular party was the SP which received 48.6% of the vote. The next three most popular parties were the CVP (22.9%), the SVP (20%) and the FDP (6.7%).

The entire Swiss population is generally well educated. In Cauco about 76.4% of the population (between age 25-64) have completed either non-mandatory upper secondary education or additional higher education (either University or a Fachhochschule).

Cauco has an unemployment rate of 1.19%. As of 2005, there were 8 people employed in the primary economic sector and about 3 businesses involved in this sector. 3 people are employed in the secondary sector and there is 1 business in this sector. 2 people are employed in the tertiary sector, with 1 business in this sector.

The historical population is given in the following table:

year	population
1683	c. 400
1803	149
1850	120
1950	92
1990	30
2000	37

== Notable people ==
- Roger Sablonier (1941–2010), Swiss historian and writer, University of Zürich faculty
