= Selma, Switzerland =

Selma
- Former municipality
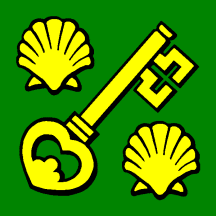
- Flag Coat of arms
- Location of Selma
- Location within Switzerland Location within Canton of Graubünden
- Coordinates: 46°19′N 9°7′E
- Country: Switzerland
- Canton: Graubünden
- District: Moesa

Area
  - Total: 2.88 km^{2} (1.11 sq mi)
- Elevation: 977 m (3,205 ft)

Population (Dec 2013)
  - Total: 33
  - Density: 11/km^{2} (30/sq mi)
- Time zone: UTC+01:00 (CET)
  - Summer (DST): UTC+02:00 (CEST)
- Postal code: 6545
- SFOS number: 3811
- ISO 3166 code: CH-GR
- Surrounded by: Arvigo, Braggio, Cauco, Santa Maria in Calanca
- Twin towns: Wittenbach (Switzerland)
- Website: www.comunedicalanca.ch

Selma is a former municipality in Moesa District in the Swiss canton of Graubünden. On 1 January 2015 the former municipalities of Arvigo, Braggio, Cauco and Selma merged to form the new municipality of Calanca.

The local language is Italian.

With a population at the end of 2008 of only 36, it was one of the smallest communities in Switzerland. The village had however declared its intention to remain an independent entity.

== Geography ==
Before the merger, Selma had a total area of 2.9 km^{2} (1.1 mi^{2}). Of this area, 5.6% is used for agricultural purposes, while 68.8% is forested. Of the rest of the land, 3.5% is settled (buildings or roads) and the remainder (22.2%) is non-productive (rivers, glaciers or mountains).

The former municipality is located in the Calanca sub-district of the Moesa district.

== Demographics ==
Selma had a population (as of 2013) of 33. As of 2008, 8.3% of the population was made up of foreign nationals. Over the last 10 years the population has decreased at a rate of -4.9%. Most of the population (as of 2000) speaks Italian (65.9%), with the rest (34.1%) speaking German.

As of 2000, the gender distribution of the population was 48.7% male and 51.3% female. The age distribution, as of 2000, in Selma is; 8 children or 18.2% of the population are between 0 and 9 years old. 2 teenagers or 4.5% are 10 to 14, and no one is between 15 and 19. Of the adult population, 2 people or 4.5% of the population are between 20 and 29 years old. 9 people or 20.5% are 30 to 39, 5 people or 11.4% are 40 to 49, and 7 people or 15.9% are 50 to 59. The senior population distribution is 5 people or 11.4% of the population are between 60 and 69 years old, 5 people or 11.4% are 70 to 79, there is 1 person who is 80 to 89.

In the 2007 Swiss federal election the CVP received 53.8% of the vote. Most of the rest of the votes went to the SP with 36.3% of the vote.

In Selma about 84% of the population (between age 25–64) have completed either non-mandatory upper secondary education or additional higher education (either university or a Fachhochschule).

Selma has an unemployment rate of 3.41%. As of 2005, there were 2 people employed in the primary economic sector and about 1 business involved in this sector. people are employed in the secondary sector and there are businesses in this sector. 5 people are employed in the tertiary sector, with 2 businesses in this sector.

The historical population is given in the following table:

Year	Population
1683	c. 300
1733	200
1830	93
1850	73
1900	71
1950	60
1970	34
1990	31
2000	44
