= Zapporthorn =

Mountain in Switzerland

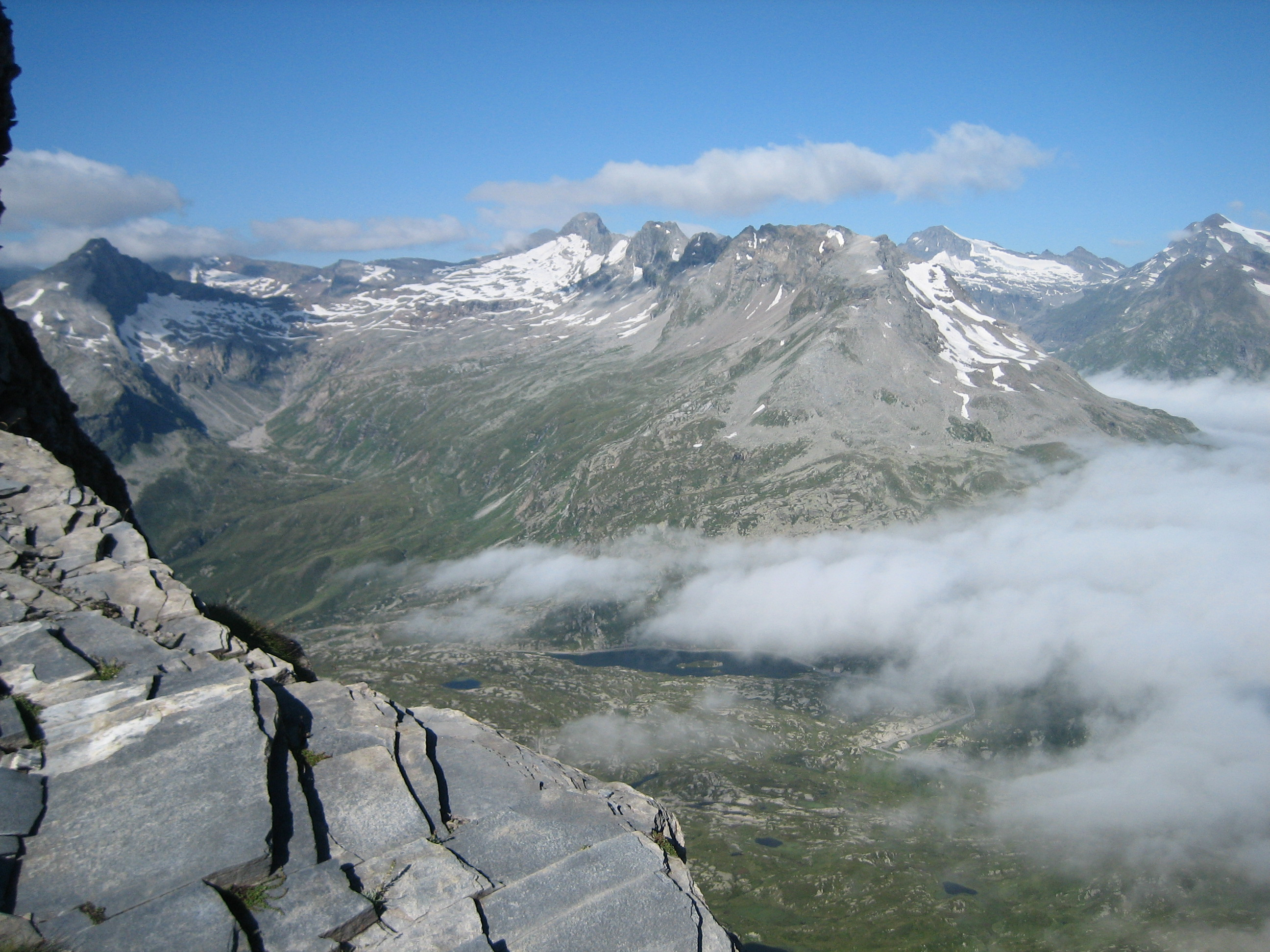
- The Zapporthorn (centre) and Zapportgrat seen from above San Bernardino Pass

Highest point
- Elevation: 3,152 m (10,341 ft)
- Prominence: 152 m (499 ft)
- Parent peak: Vogelberg
- Coordinates: 46°28′46.9″N 9°6′45.2″E

Geography
- Location within Switzerland
- Location: Graubünden, Switzerland
- Parent range: Lepontine Alps

The Zapporthorn or Pizzo Zapport (3,152 m) is a mountain of the Swiss Lepontine Alps, overlooking San Bernardino Pass in Graubünden. Its summit is the tripoint between the valleys of Hinterrhein, Calanca and Mesolcina. The summit is located approximately two kilometres east from the Ticino border.

The Pizzo Zapport is the highest summit on the Zapportgrat, a ridge running from Piz de Stabi to the Marscholhorn. The Zapportgletscher lies on the north side, it is the largest glacier of the massif.
