= Santa Maria in Calanca =

- Municipality
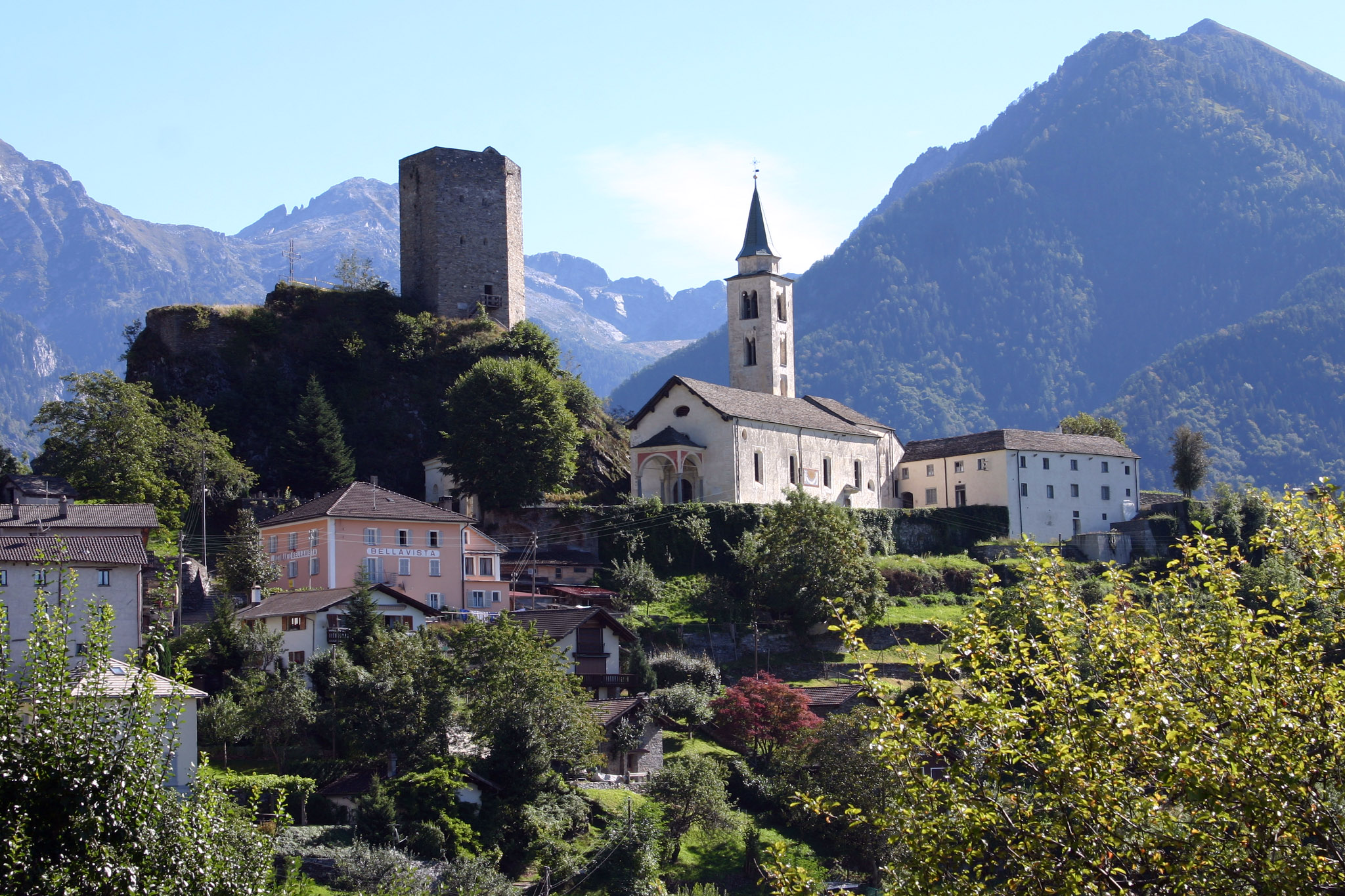

- Flag Coat of arms
- Location of Santa Maria in Calanca
- Location within Switzerland Location within Canton of Grisons
- Coordinates: 46°16′N 9°9′E
- Country: Switzerland
- Canton: Grisons
- District: Moesa

Area
  - Total: 9.32 km^{2} (3.60 sq mi)
- Elevation: 955 m (3,133 ft)

Population (December 2020)
  - Total: 115
  - Density: 12.3/km^{2} (32.0/sq mi)
- Time zone: UTC+01:00 (CET)
  - Summer (DST): UTC+02:00 (CEST)
- Postal code: 6541
- SFOS number: 3810
- ISO 3166 code: CH-GR
- Surrounded by: Braggio, Buseno, Castaneda, Cauco, Grono, Selma, Verdabbio
- Website: santamariaic.ch/

Santa Maria in Calanca is a municipality in the Moesa Region in the Swiss canton of the Grisons.

== History ==
Santa Maria in Calanca is first mentioned in 1219 as sancte Marie in Calanca.

== Geography ==
Aerial view (1953)

Santa Maria in Calanca has an area, as of 2006, of 9.3 km^{2} (3.6 sq mi). Of this area, 5.6% is used for agricultural purposes, while 73.2% is forested. Of the rest of the land, 1.6% is settled (buildings or roads) and the remainder (19.6%) is non-productive (rivers, glaciers or mountains).

Before 2017, the municipality was located in the Calanca sub-district of the Moesa district, after 2017 it was part of the Moesa Region.

== Demographics ==
Santa Maria in Calanca has a population (as of 31 December 2020) of 115. As of 2008, 4.4% of the population was made up of foreign nationals. Over the last 10 years the population has decreased at a rate of -5.3%. Most of the population (as of 2000) speaks Italian (86.5%), with German being second most common ( 9.9%) and French being third ( 2.7%).

As of 2000, the gender distribution of the population was 47.7% male and 52.3% female. The age distribution, as of 2000, in Santa Maria in Calanca is; 4 children or 3.6% of the population are between 0 and 9 years old. 2 teenagers or 1.8% are 10 to 14, and 6 teenagers or 5.4% are 15 to 19. Of the adult population, 7 people or 6.3% of the population are between 20 and 29 years old. 14 people or 12.6% are 30 to 39, 21 people or 18.9% are 40 to 49, and 18 people or 16.2% are 50 to 59. The senior population distribution is 14 people or 12.6% of the population are between 60 and 69 years old, 15 people or 13.5% are 70 to 79, there are 9 people or 8.1% who are 80 to 89, and there is 1 person who is 90 to 99.

In the 2007 federal election the most popular party was the SP which received 46.4% of the vote. The next three most popular parties were the SVP (25.5%), the CVP (16.7%) and the FDP (11.5%).

In Santa Maria in Calanca about 64.6% of the population (between age 25-64) have completed either non-mandatory upper secondary education or additional higher education (either university or a Fachhochschule).

Santa Maria in Calanca has an unemployment rate of 0.15%. As of 2005, there were 14 people employed in the primary economic sector and about 8 businesses involved in this sector. 3 people are employed in the secondary sector and there are 2 businesses in this sector. 4 people are employed in the tertiary sector, with 4 businesses in this sector.

The historical population is given in the following table:

year	population
1808	207
1850	206
1900	163
1950	202
2000	111

== Heritage sites of national significance ==
The Castello and the Church of S. Maria Assunta are listed as Swiss heritage sites of national significance.

The Castello or Torre di Sta. Maria is a large pentagonal tower house with a two story vaulted ceiling. The actual construction date is unknown but it is first mentioned in 1253.

The Church of Santa Maria Assunta was first mentioned in 1291. The baroque coffered ceiling from the 17th Century is particularly noteworthy.

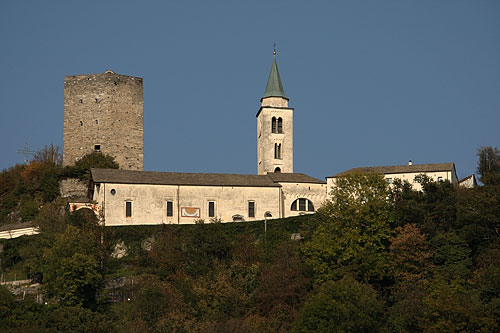
The Castello and Church of S. Maria Assunta

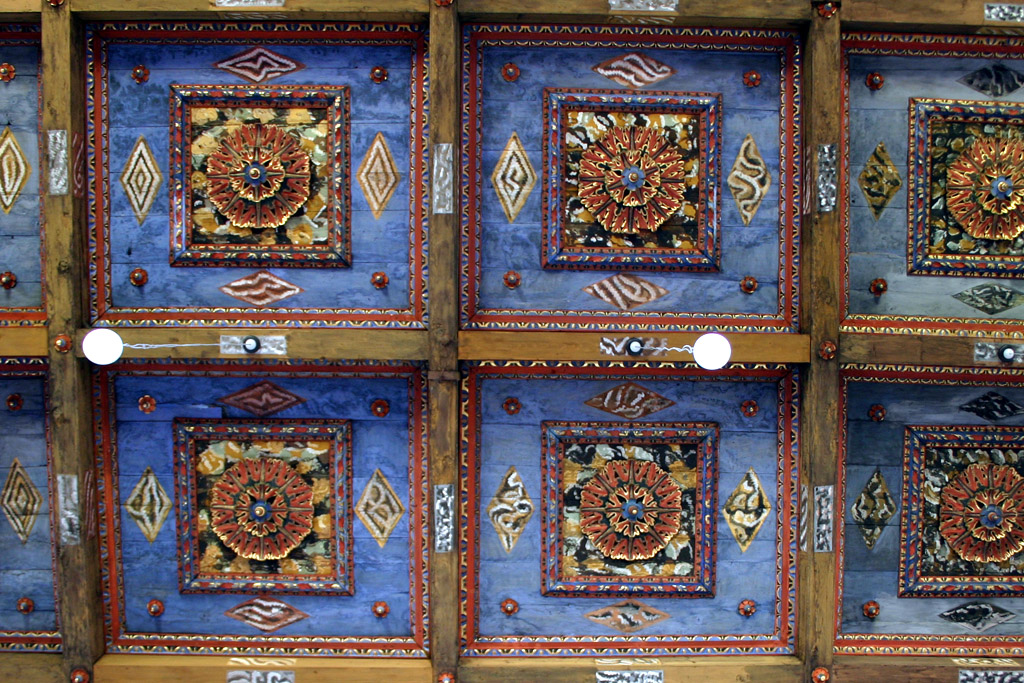
Coffered ceiling in the church

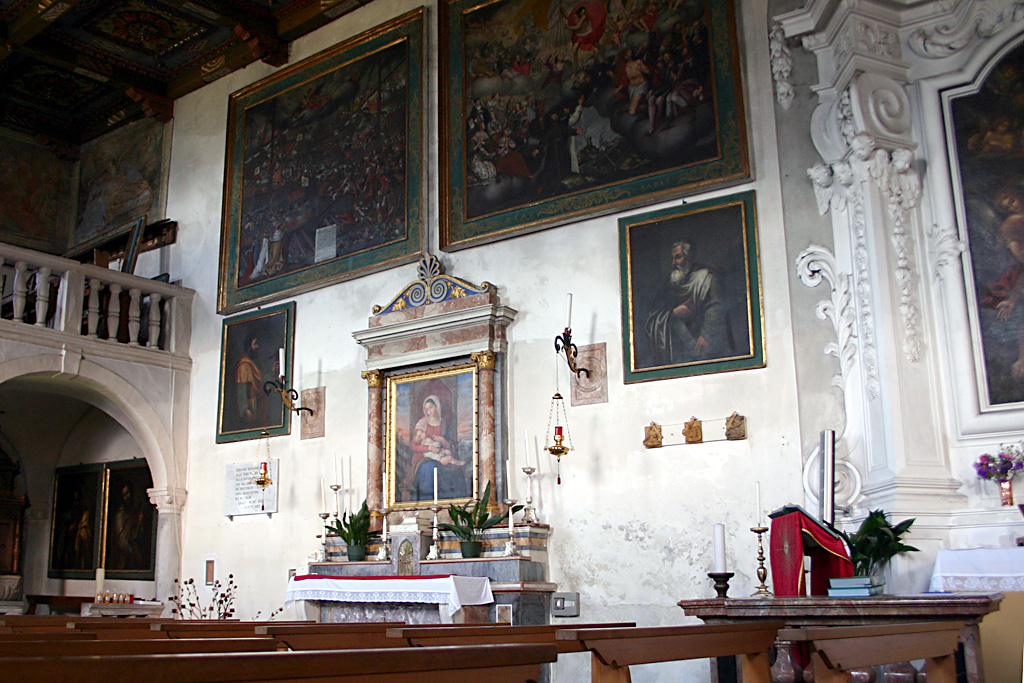
Side altars in the church

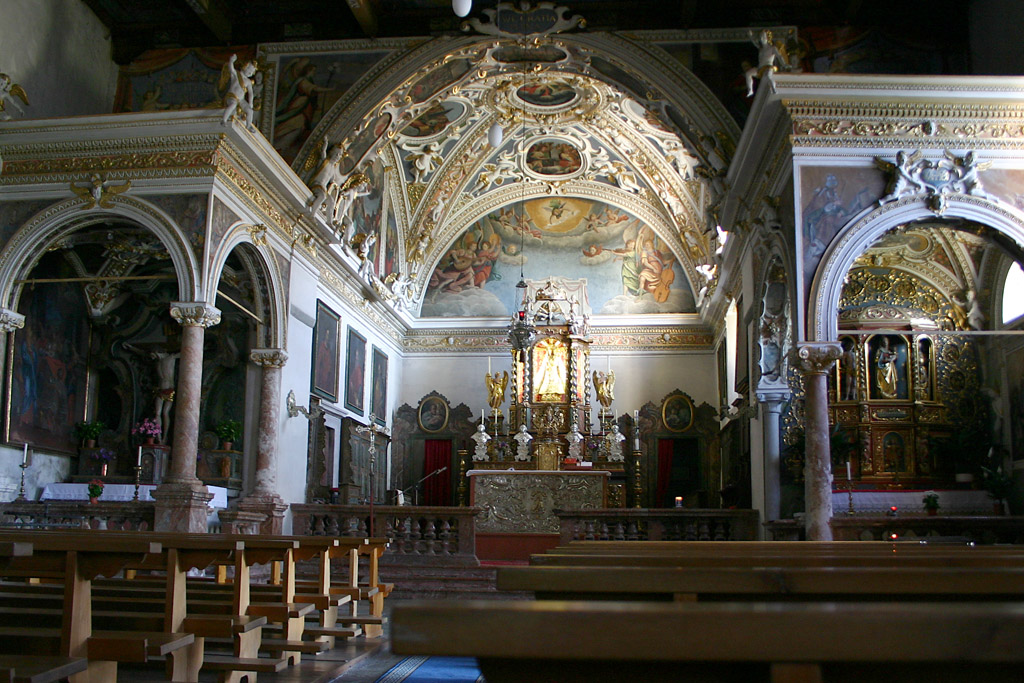
Main altar of the church
