= List of valleys of the Alps =

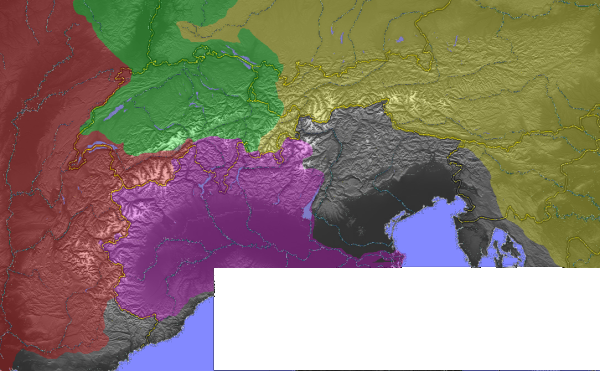

The main valleys of the Alps, orographically by drainage basin.

== Rhine basin (North Sea) ==
Map of the Aar basin

High Rhine

- Aare
  - Limmat
    - Linth (Glarus)
      - Lake Walen
        - Seeztal
      - Klöntal
      - Sernftal
  - Reuss
    - Lake Lucerne
      - Sarner Aa (Brünig Pass connects to the Aare basin)
      - Muota
    - Schächental, Klausen Pass connects to Glarus
    - Urseren
    - Susten Pass connects to the Gadmertal
    - Furka Pass connects to the Goms
  - Saane/Sarine
    - Sense
  - Gürbetal
  - Lake Thun, Bernese Oberland
    - Kander
      - Simmental
        - Diemtigental (Chirel, Fildrich (Narebach, Senggibach, Gurbsbach))
      - Suldtal
      - Kiental
      - Engstligental
      - Kandertal
    - Lombach, Habkern
    - Brienzersee, Interlaken
      - Lütschine
        - Saxettal
        - Schwarze Lütschine, Lütschental, Grindelwald, Grosse Scheidegg connects to Reichenbachtal
        - Weisse Lütschine, Lauterbrunnental, Lauterbrunnen
          - Sefinental
      - Giessbach
      - Haslital, Meiringen
        - Reichenbachtal (Rychenbach, Seilibach), Grosse Scheidegg connects to Schwarze Lütschine
        - Gadmertal (Gadmerwasser, Triftwasser), Susten Pass connects to the Reuss
        - Ürbachtal
        - Rindertal (Ärlenbach), Bächliltal (Bächlisbach)
        - Grimsel Pass connects to the Goms and the Furka Pass
- Tösstal
- Toggenburg (Thur)
- Rhine Valley (Alpine Rhine)
  - Ill
    - Meng
  - Tamina
  - Prättigau (Landquart)
  - Schanfigg (Plessur)
  - posterior Rhine
    - Albula
      - Landwasser (Davos)
      - Oberhalbstein (Julier Pass connects to the Inn basin)
      - Albulatal, Bergün, Preda (Albula Pass connects to the Inn basin)
    - Averstal
    - Splügen Pass connects to the Mera basin, San Bernardino Pass to the Moesa basin
  - anterior Rhine
    - Safien valley
    - Lumnezia (Glogn)
      - Vals Valley
    - Surselva (Oberalppass connects to the Reuss basin, Lukmanier Pass to the Leventina)

== Danube basin (Black Sea) ==
Danube

- Sava
  - Planica (Julian Alps)
- Drava
  - Dravinja
  - Gail (river)
  - Meža
  - Gurk (river)
  - Mura
- Inn
  - Ötztal
  - Zillertal
  - Engadin

== Mediterranean ==
=== Rhone basin ===
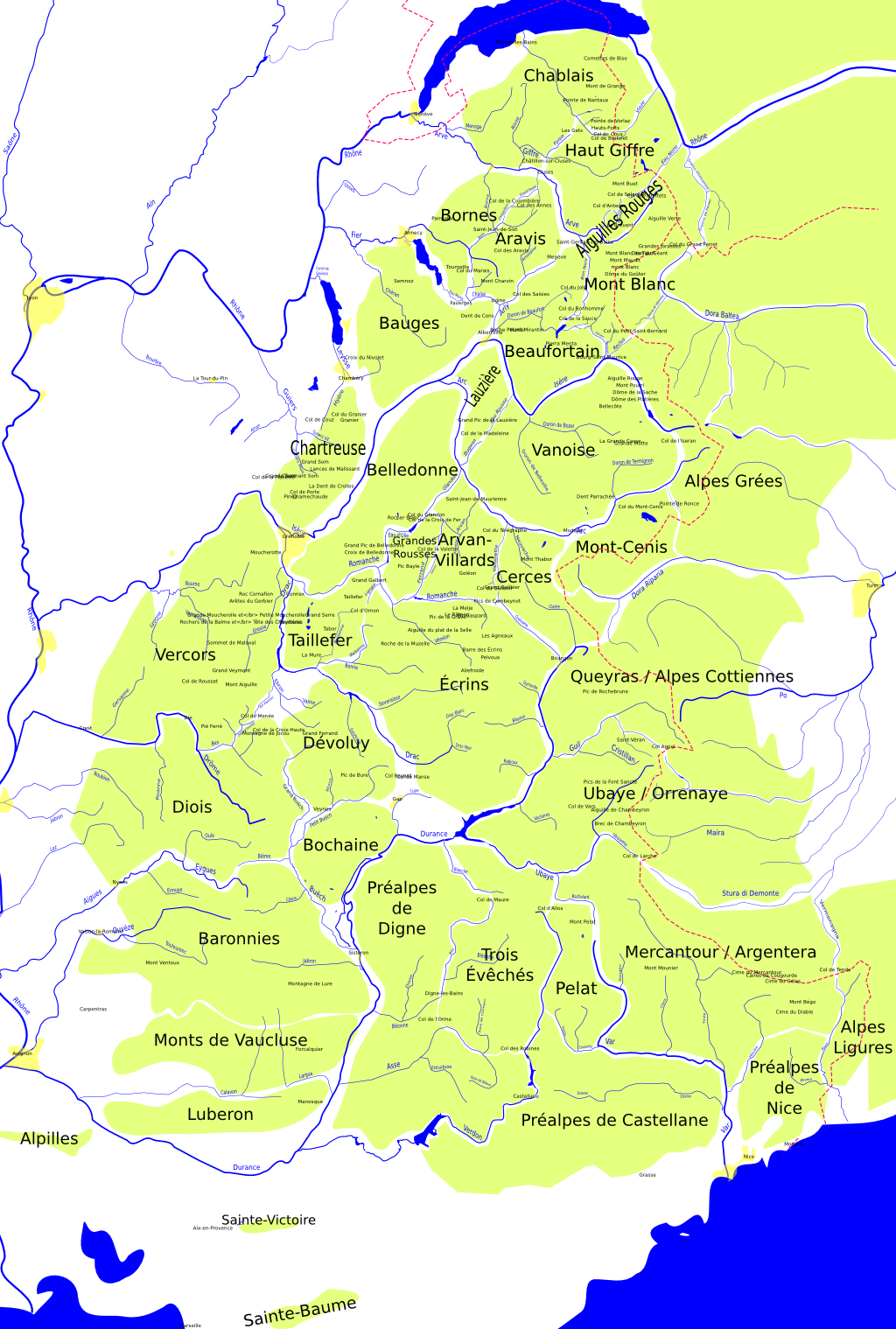
Rhone tributaries in the Western Alps.

Rhône

- Durance
  - Verdon
- Drôme
- Isère
  - Arc
  - Drac
- Fier
- Arve
- Chablais
- Valais
  - Dranse
    - Val de Banse
    - Val d'Entremont
  - Val d'Hérens, Val d'Herémece
  - Val d'Anniviers
  - Turtmanntal
  - Lötschental
  - Vispa
    - Saastal
    - Mattertal
      - Zmuttal
  - Goms (Nufenen Pass to the Leventina, Grimsel Pass to the Haslital, Furka Pass to the Reuss)
    - Binntal

=== Other ===
- Roya
- Var
- Verdon

== Adriatic ==
=== Po basin ===
Po

- Mincio
- Oglio (Lake Iseo)
  - Val Camonica
- Adda (river) (Lake Como)
  - Breggia
  - Val Bregaglia (Mera)
    - Valle Spluga (Liro (stream - SO))
  - Val Brembana
  - Valsassina (Pioverna)
  - Valtellina
- Lambro
- Ticino
  - Val Mesolcina
  - Valle Maggia
  - Valle Verzasca
  - Toce
- Agogna
- Tanaro
- Sesia
- Aosta Valley (Dora Baltea)
- Toce
- Orco
- Stura di Lanzo
- Dora Riparia
- Maira
- Varaita
- Pellice

=== Other ===
Adige

- Val Müstair
- Vinschgau
- Etschtal

== See also ==
- Geography of the Alps
- Principal passes of the Alps
- Orography
- List of rivers of Switzerland
- List of highest paved roads in Europe
- List of mountain passes
