= Lago di Cama =

Body of water in Graubünden, Switzerland

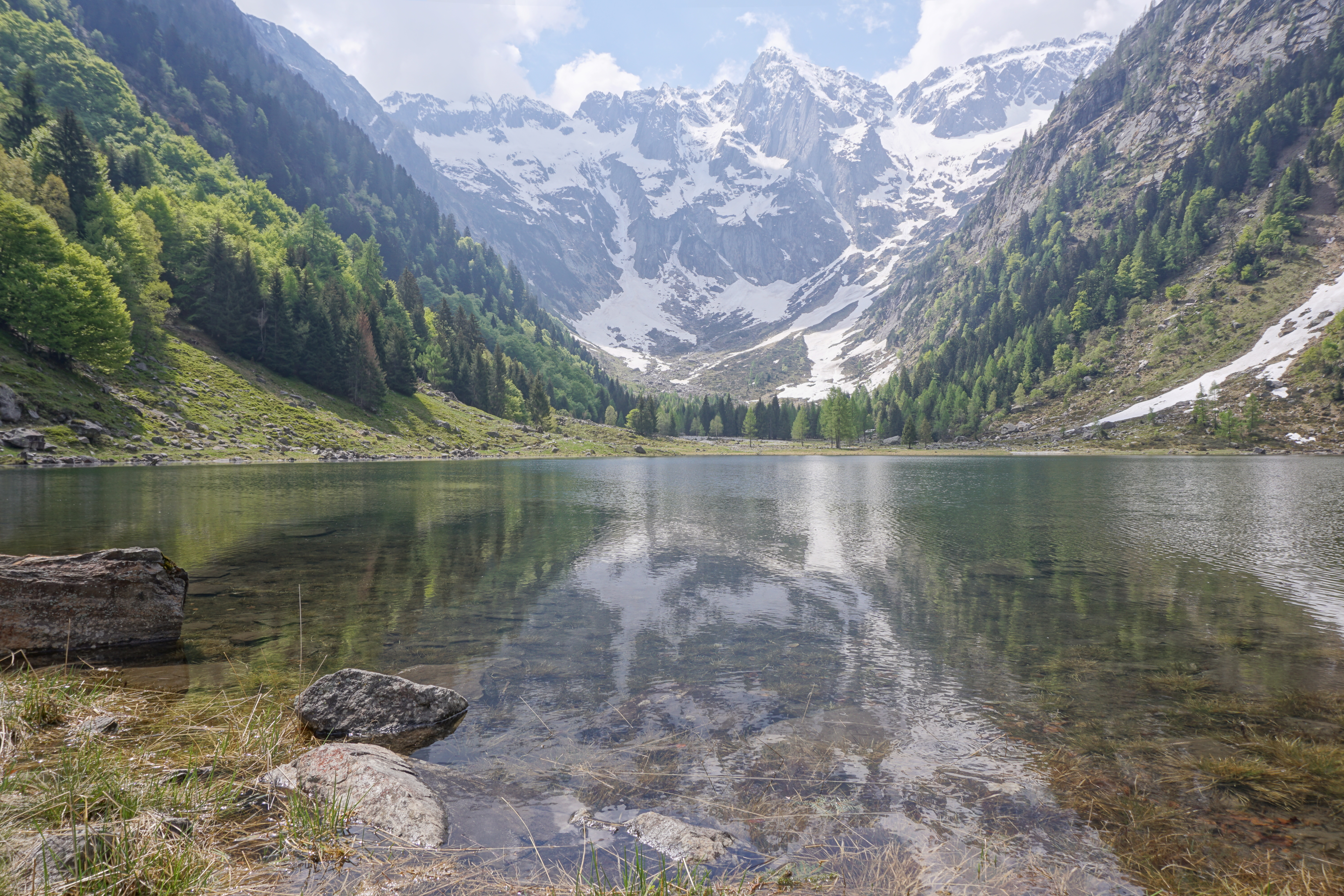

- Location within Canton of Graubünden Location within Switzerland Location within Italy Location within Alps
- Interactive map of Lago di Cama
- Location: Grisons
- Coordinates: 46°15′17″N 9°13′44″E
- Basin countries: Switzerland
- Surface area: 13.2 ha (33 acres)
- Max. depth: 16 m (52 ft)
- Surface elevation: 1,265 m (4,150 ft)

Lago di Cama (or "Lagh de Cama") is a lake in the Cama valley, a side valley of Val Mesolcina in the Grisons, Switzerland.

== See also ==
- List of mountain lakes of Switzerland
