= Norantola Castle =

Ruined castle in Switzerland

- Burg Norantola
- Cama
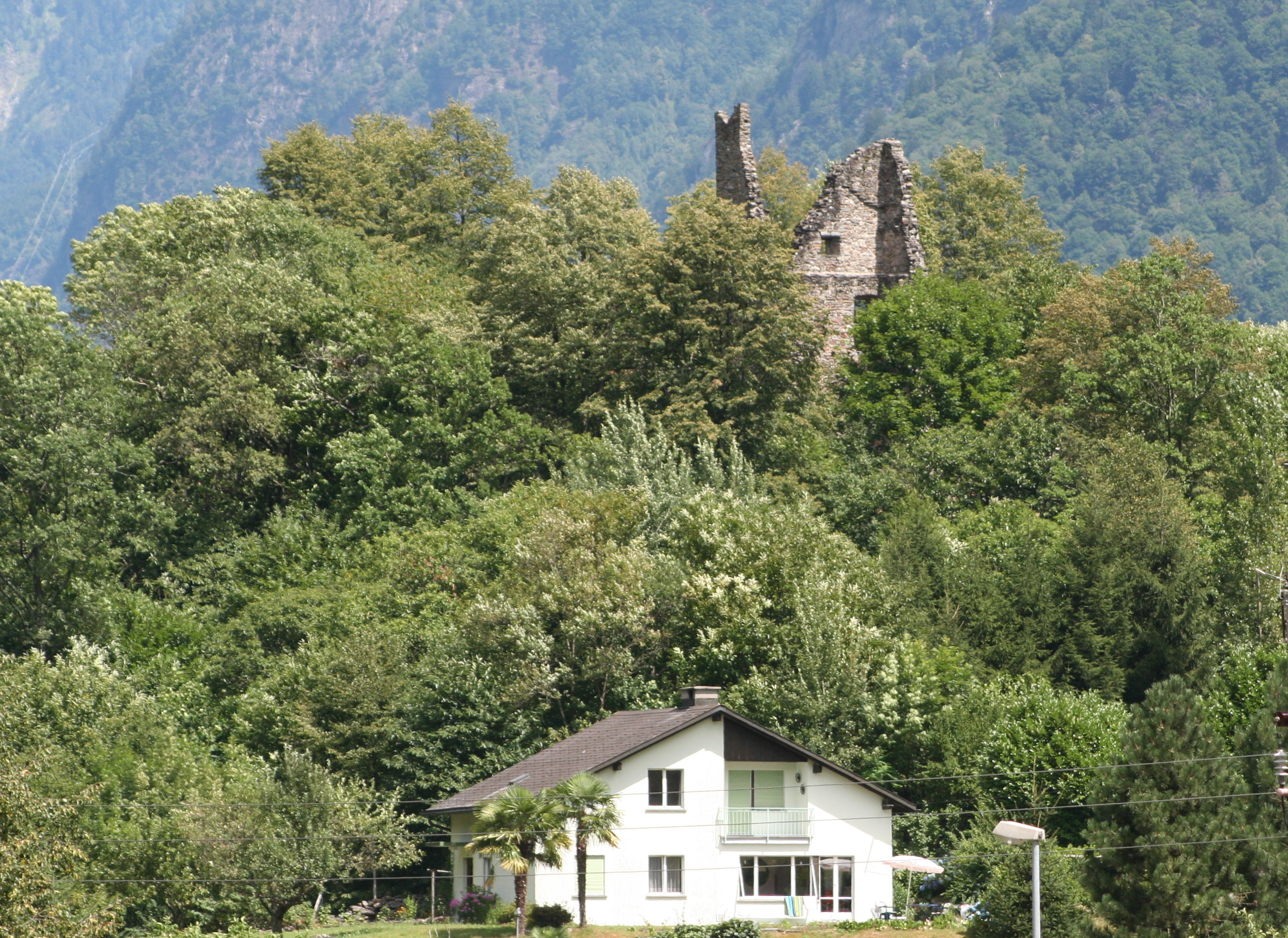
- View from the south

Site information
- Type: hill castle
- Code: CH-GR
- Condition: ruin

Location
- Coordinates: 46°16′59.59″N 9°10′35″E
- Height: 391 m above the sea

Site history
- Built: 12th century

Norantola Castle is a ruined castle in the municipality of Cama of the Canton of Graubünden in Switzerland.

== History ==
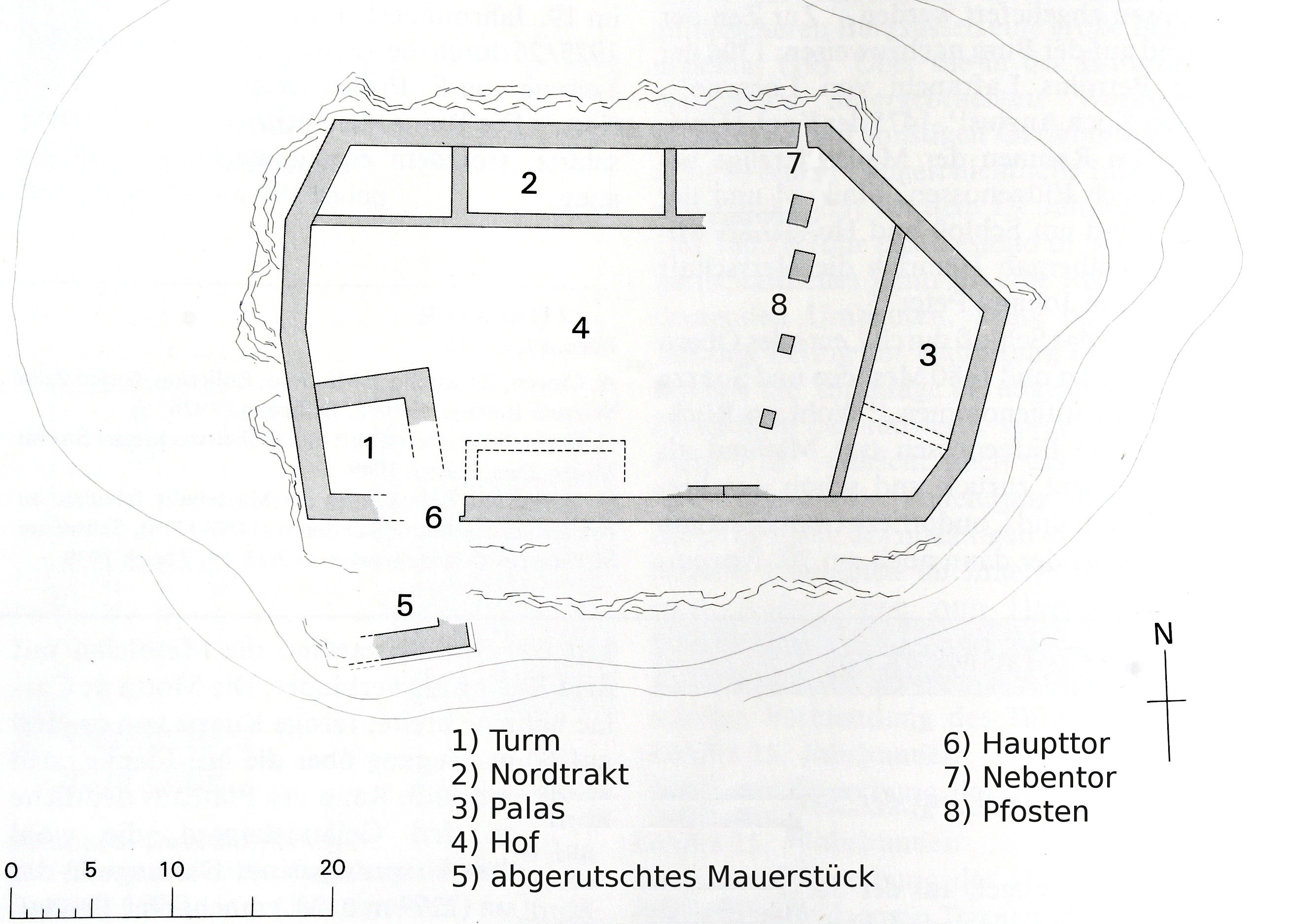
Layout of the castle

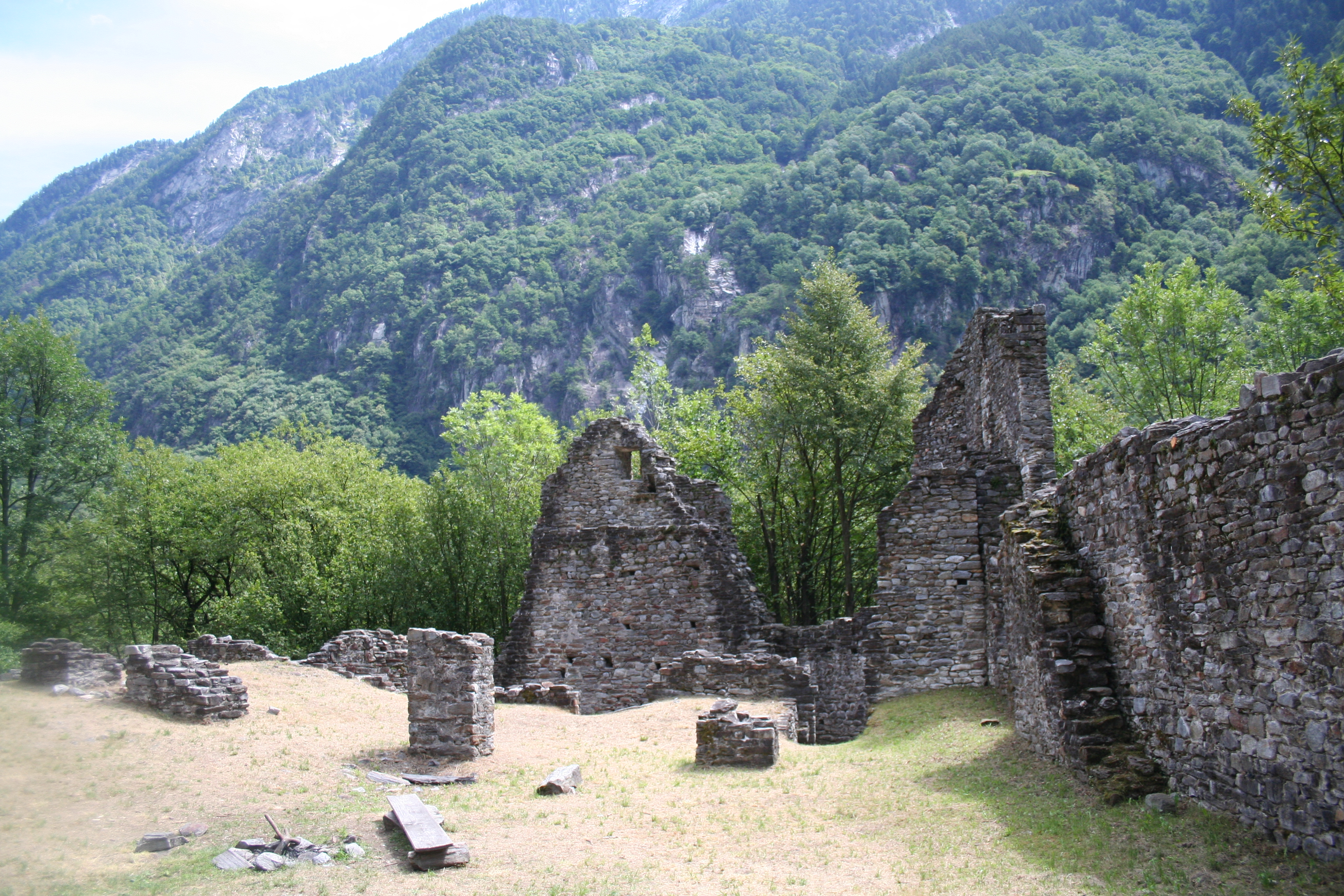
Ruins of the palas

The oldest parts of the castle were probably built in the 12th century for a local noble family. In 1248 Locarnus de Norantola is mentioned in a record and in 1295 Petrus de Norantola is mentioned. However, by around 1300 the castle was owned by the powerful Counts of Sax/Misox and the Norantola family vanished from historical records. In 1324 Ugolinus von Sax was listed as the owner of the castle. In the early 14th century, the original castle was completely rebuilt. The old ring wall was topped with swallowtail crenellations. A new tower was built on the wall. The north wing, with apartments and a throne room, and a south wing with stables were added. The original palas had a gallery added and became the east wing.

The rulers of the castle became a cadet branch of the Sax/Misox family, known as Sax-Norantola. In 1439 the local court ruled in favor of the Sax-Norantola family during a family conflict. However, in 1452 Count Henri von Sax-Misox signed an agreement with the residents of the valley that overturned all agreements and traditional rights between Sax-Norantola and the residents. In 1480 Count Peter von Sax and Gian Giacomo Trivulzio quarreled over Mesocco, which eventually led to a war. It appears that the Sax-Norantola family supported Trivulzio and his ally, the Duke of Milan. After 1480 either Trivulzio or the Duke of Milan helped reinforce that castle. However, it was ineffective because in 1483, during fighting between the Duke and the Count, Norantola Castle was burned by Sax-Misox troops. The castle was never rebuilt and in the 16th century the Sax-Norantola family lived in Bellinzona.

== Gallery ==
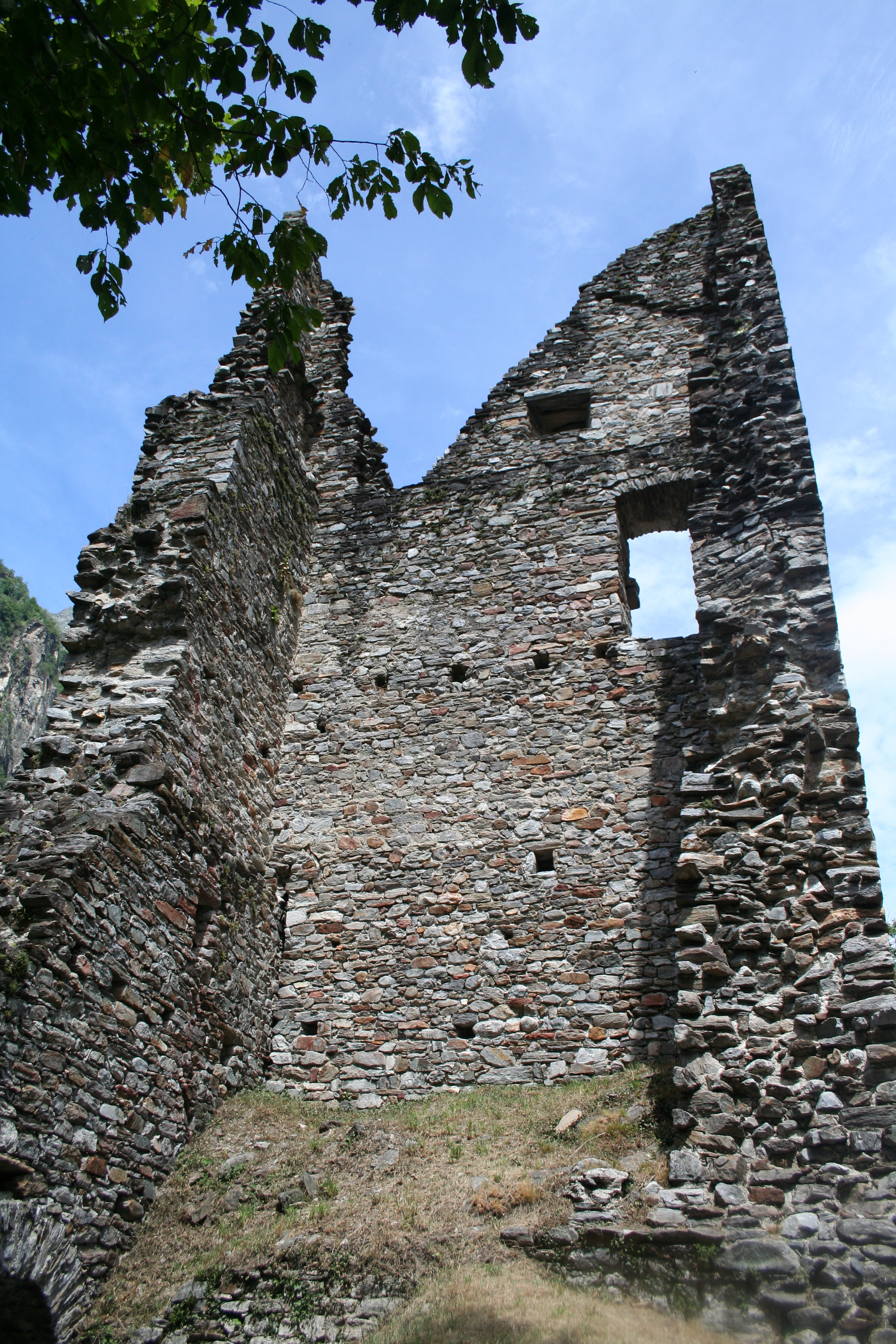
Tower interior

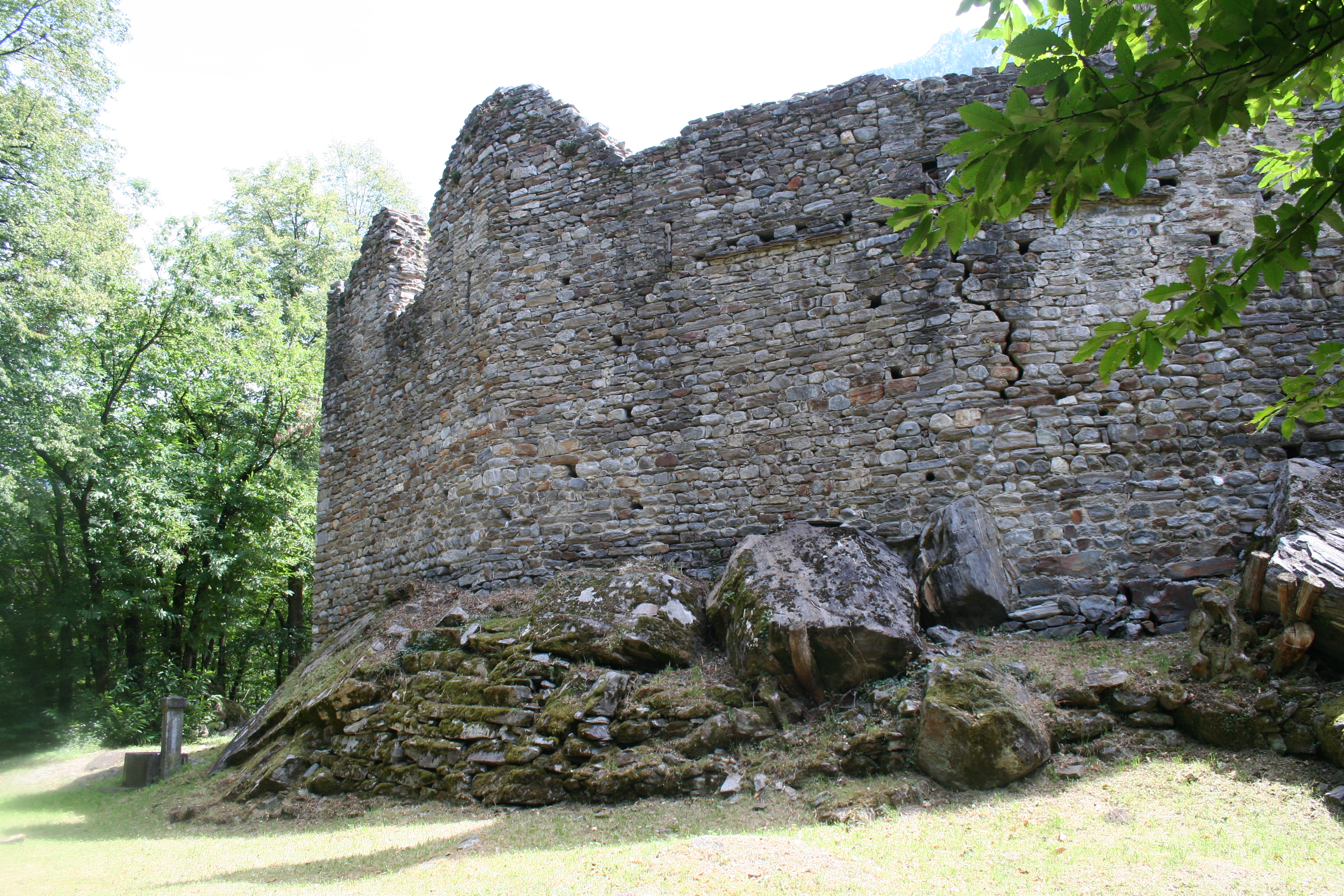
Ruins of the west wall

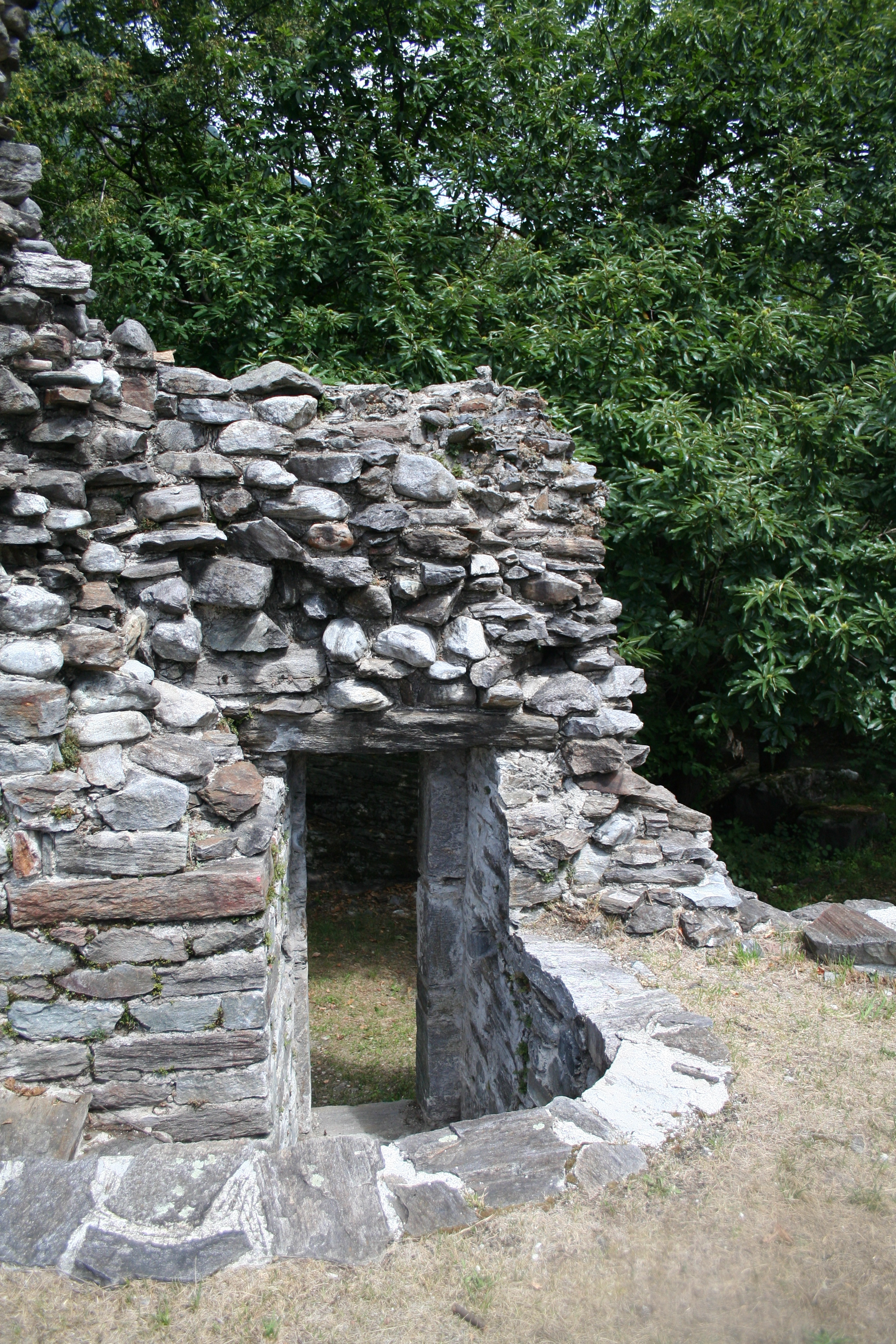
Gateway

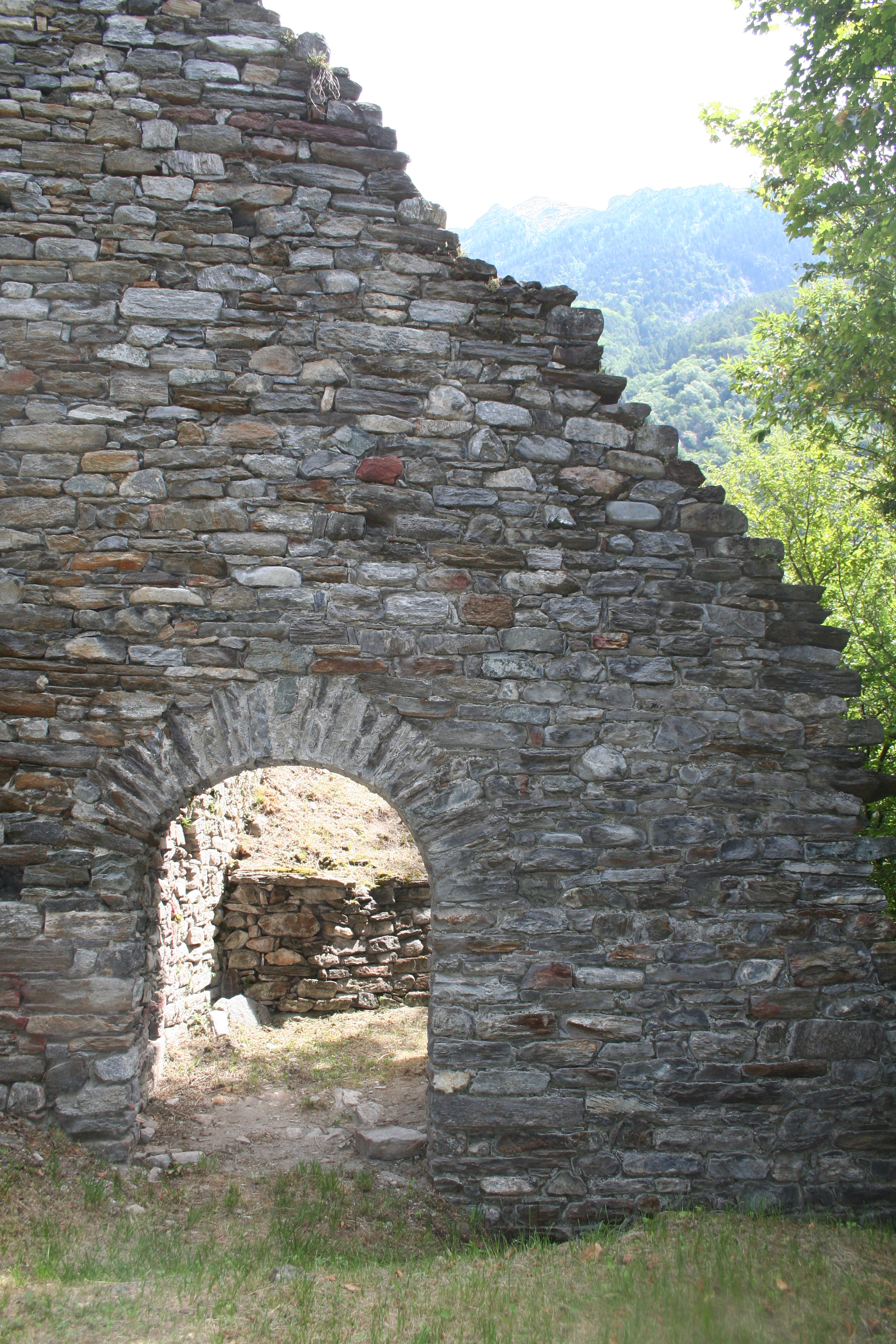
Doorway

== See also ==
- List of castles in Switzerland
