= Valle Mesolcina =

Valley in the Grisons, Switzerland

- Val Mesolcina, Misox (German)
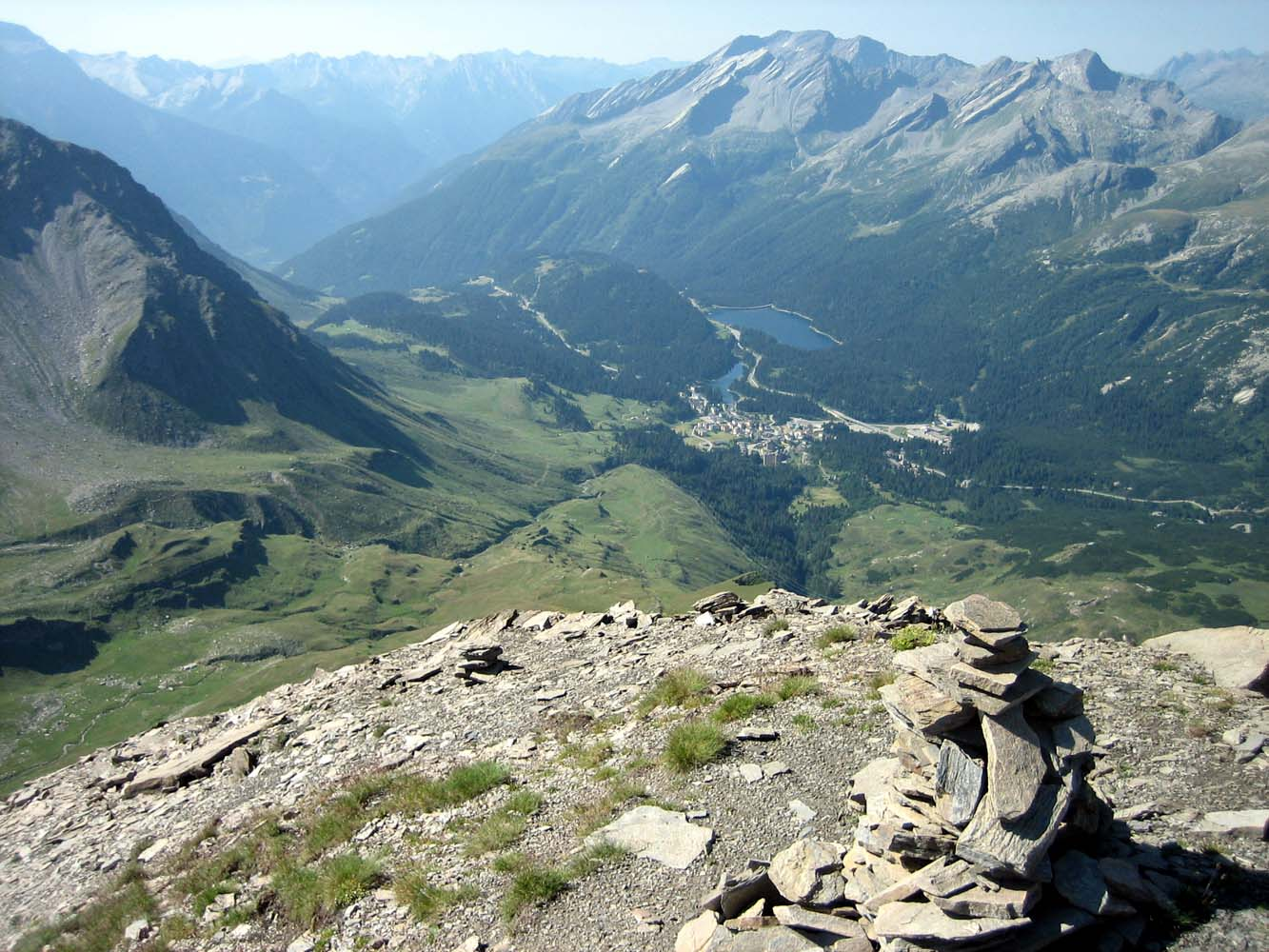
- View from Pizzo Uccello southward into the Val Mesolcina

Geography
- Location: Grisons
- Country: Switzerland
- Coordinates: 46°23′06″N 9°14′06″E
- River: Moesa
- Interactive map of Valle Mesolcina

The Valle Mesolcina, also known as the Val Mesolcina or Misox (German), is an alpine valley of the Grisons, Switzerland, stretching from the San Bernardino Pass to Grono where it joins the Calanca Valley. It is the valley formed by the river Moesa.

Like the Val Bregaglia or the Val Poschiavo, the Valle Mesolcina is a valley lying south of the main ridge of the Alps. Although politically the Valle Mesolcina belongs to the Grisons, its population is predominantly Italian-speaking and culturally oriented towards the Ticino.

The valley includes the Mesocco and Roveredo of the Moesa district, including:

- Mesocco
- Soazza
- Lostallo
- Verdabbio
- Cama
- Leggia
- Grono
- Roveredo
- San Vittore

== Religion ==
The majority of the population adheres to Roman Catholicism, but there is a significant Protestant community, located in Grono and adhering to the Evangelical Reformed Church of the Canton of Grisons.
