= Valser Rhine =

River in Switzerland

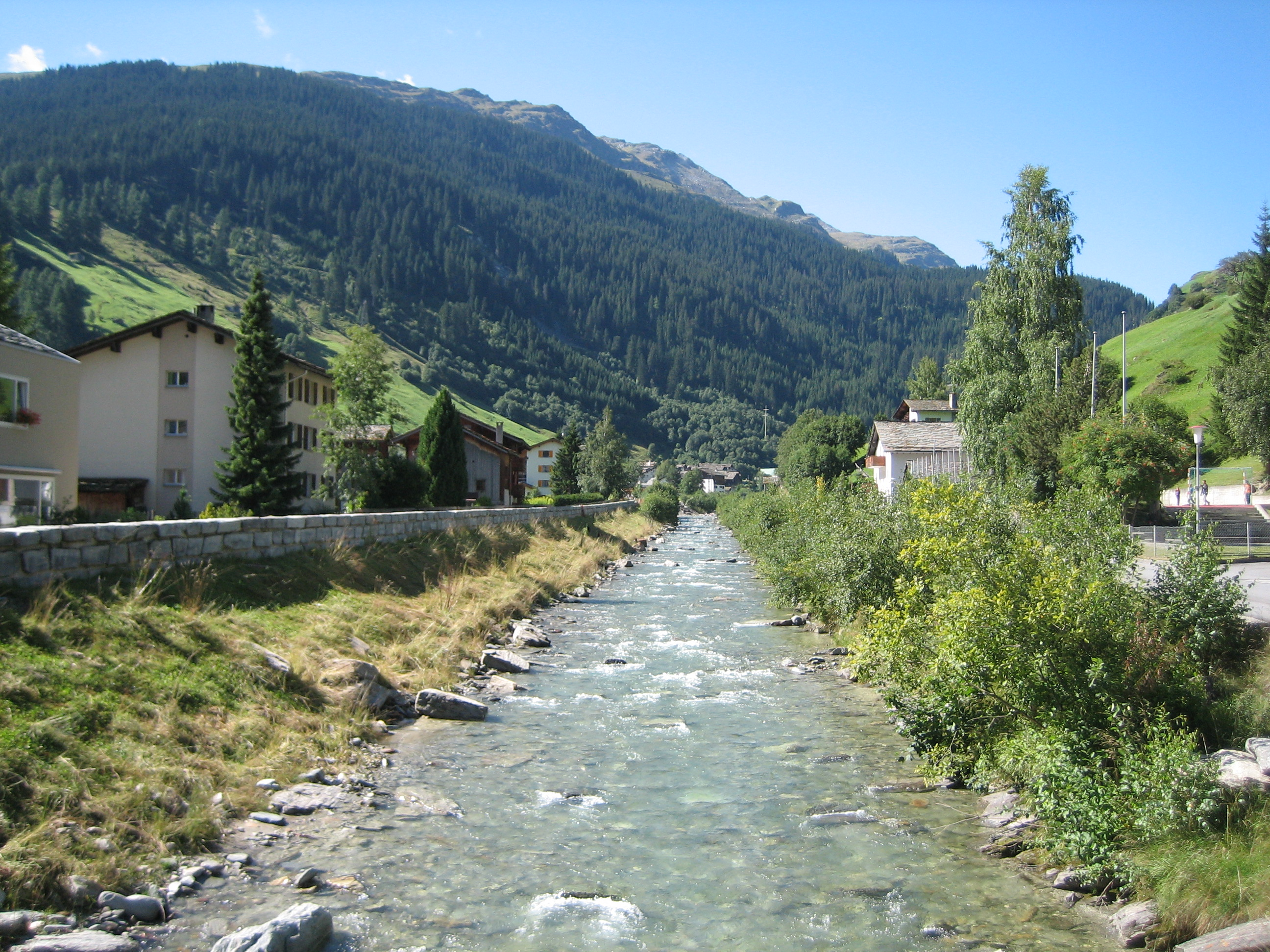
- Valser Rhine
- Native name: Valser Rhein (German)

Location
- Country: Switzerland
- Canton: Graubünden

Physical characteristics
- Source
  - location: Grauhorn Glacier and Länta Glacier
  - coordinates: 46°31′2.4″N 9°2′20.1″E
  - elevation: 2,500 m (8,200 ft)
- Mouth
  - location: Confluence with Glenner in Suraua
  - coordinates: 46°42′11″N 9°10′51″E
  - elevation: 855 m (2,805 ft)

Basin features
- Progression: Glogn→ Vorderrhein→ Rhine→ North Sea
- Tributaries
  - right: Peilerbach, Tomuelbach, ...
- Waterbodies: Zervreilasee

The Valser Rhine (German: Valser Rhein) is a source of the river Rhine in the Swiss canton of Graubünden. The river originates from the Länta Glacier and the Grauhorn Glacier at the northern foot of the Rheinwaldhorn and initially flows through the valley Länta before it flows into the Zervreilasee reservoir. Before the construction of the reservoir, the brooks Hornbach and Canalbach would flow into Valser Rhine from the right at the village of Zervreila. Today, the brooks flow into the reservoir, as does the Finsterbach, also from the right.

Below the Zervreila dam, the Valser Rhine flows through the Vals Valley and the municipality of Vals. Before the village of Vals, the Peilerbach joins the Valser Rhine, below the village, the Tomuelbach from Tomül Pass joins from the right. The Valser Rhine then flows past St. Martin and joins the Glogn at Suraua. Several kilometers downstream, the Glogn flows into the Anterior Rhine.

The Valser Rhine has many rapids and waterfalls and is very popular with canoeists.
