= Grono, Switzerland =

Grono
- Municipality
- Flag Coat of arms
- Location of Grono
- Location within Switzerland Location within Canton of Grisons
- Coordinates: 46°15′N 9°09′E
- Country: Switzerland
- Canton: Grisons
- District: Moesa

Government
  - Mayor: Carlo Bernasconi

Area
  - Total: 14.83 km^{2} (5.73 sq mi)
- Elevation: 336 m (1,102 ft)

Population (December 2020)
  - Total: 1,397
  - Density: 94.20/km^{2} (244.0/sq mi)
- Time zone: UTC+01:00 (CET)
  - Summer (DST): UTC+02:00 (CEST)
- Postal code: 6537
- SFOS number: 3832
- ISO 3166 code: CH-GR
- Surrounded by: Cama, Castaneda, Dosso del Liro (IT-CO), Leggia, Roveredo, Santa Maria in Calanca, Verdabbio
- Website: grono.moesano.ch

Grono is a municipality in the Moesa Region in the Italian speaking part of the Swiss canton of Grisons. On 1 January 2017 the former municipalities of Leggia and Verdabbio merged into the municipality of Grono.

== History ==
=== Grono ===
Grono is first mentioned in 1219 as de Grono. In 1395 it was mentioned as de Agrono.

=== Leggia ===
Leggia is first mentioned in 1295 as de Legia.

=== Verdabbio ===
Verdabbio is first mentioned in 1203 as Vertabio.

== Geography ==
After the 2017 merger Grono had an area of 37.12 km^{2} (14.33 sq mi). Before the merger Grono had an area, (as of the 2004/09 survey) of 14.83 square kilometers (5.73 sq mi). Of this area, about 8.6% is used for agricultural purposes, while 58.4% is forested. Of the rest of the land, 4.5% is settled (buildings or roads) and 28.5% is unproductive land. In the 2004/09 survey a total of 44 ha (110 acres) or about 3.0% of the total area was covered with buildings, an increase of 11 ha (27 acres) over the 1983 amount.

Of the agricultural land, 4 ha (9.9 acres) is used for orchards and vineyards, 68 ha (170 acres) is fields and grasslands and 69 ha (170 acres) consists of alpine grazing areas. Since 1983 the amount of agricultural land has decreased by 12 ha (30 acres). Over the same time period the amount of forested land has increased by 25 ha (62 acres). Rivers and lakes cover 32 ha (79 acres) in the municipality.

Before 2017, the municipality was located in the Roveredo sub-district of the Moesa district, after 2017 it was part of the Moesa Region. The village is on the right bank of the Moesa river by the mouth of the Calanca.

== Demographics ==
After the 2017 merger Grono has a population (as of December 2020) of 1,397. As of 2014, 32.3% of the population are resident foreign nationals. In 2015 a small minority (155 or 15.2% of the population) was born in Italy and 89 or 8.7% of the population was born in Portugal. Over the last 4 years (2010-2014) the population has changed at a rate of 6.72%. The birth rate in the municipality, in 2014, was 13.9, while the death rate was 7.0 per thousand residents.

As of 2000, the gender distribution of the population was 51.4% male and 48.6% female. The age distribution, as of 2000, in Grono is; 93 children or 10.2% of the population were between 0 and 9 years old. 40 teenagers or 4.4% were 10 to 14, and 40 teenagers or 4.4% were 15 to 19. Of the adult population, 107 people or 11.7% of the population were between 20 and 29 years old. 130 people or 14.2% were 30 to 39, 145 people or 15.8% were 40 to 49, and 138 people or 15.1% were 50 to 59. The senior population distribution was 87 people or 9.5% of the population were between 60 and 69 years old, 68 people or 7.4% were 70 to 79, there were 58 people or 6.3% who were 80 to 89, and there were 10 people or 1.1% who were 90 to 99.

In 2015 there were 385 single residents, 507 people who were married or in a civil partnership, 56 widows or widowers and 72 divorced residents.

In 2014 there were 428 private households in Grono with an average household size of 2.32 persons. Of the 273 inhabited buildings in the municipality, in 2000, about 63.7% were single family homes and 15.8% were multiple family buildings. Additionally, about 24.2% of the buildings were built before 1919, while 13.2% were built between 1991 and 2000. In 2013 the rate of construction of new housing units per 1000 residents was 2.01. The vacancy rate for the municipality, in 2015, was 0.76%.

The historical population is given in the following table:

year	population
1773	296
1850	517
1900	484
1950	528
2000	916

== Heritage sites of national significance ==
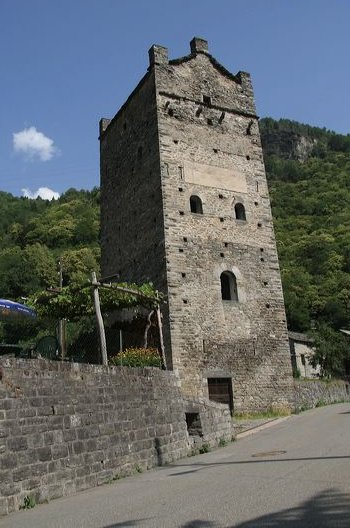
Torre Fiorenzana, a medieval tower in Grono

The Torre Fiorenzana is listed as a Swiss heritage site of national significance.

The Torre Fiorenzana was built about the end of the 12th century for the Sacco family. It is a five-story tower house with a rectangular footprint. In 1406 it was the site of the murder of Alberto de Sacco. In 1977 it was restored and is now owned by the Museo moesano.

== Sightseeing Attractions ==
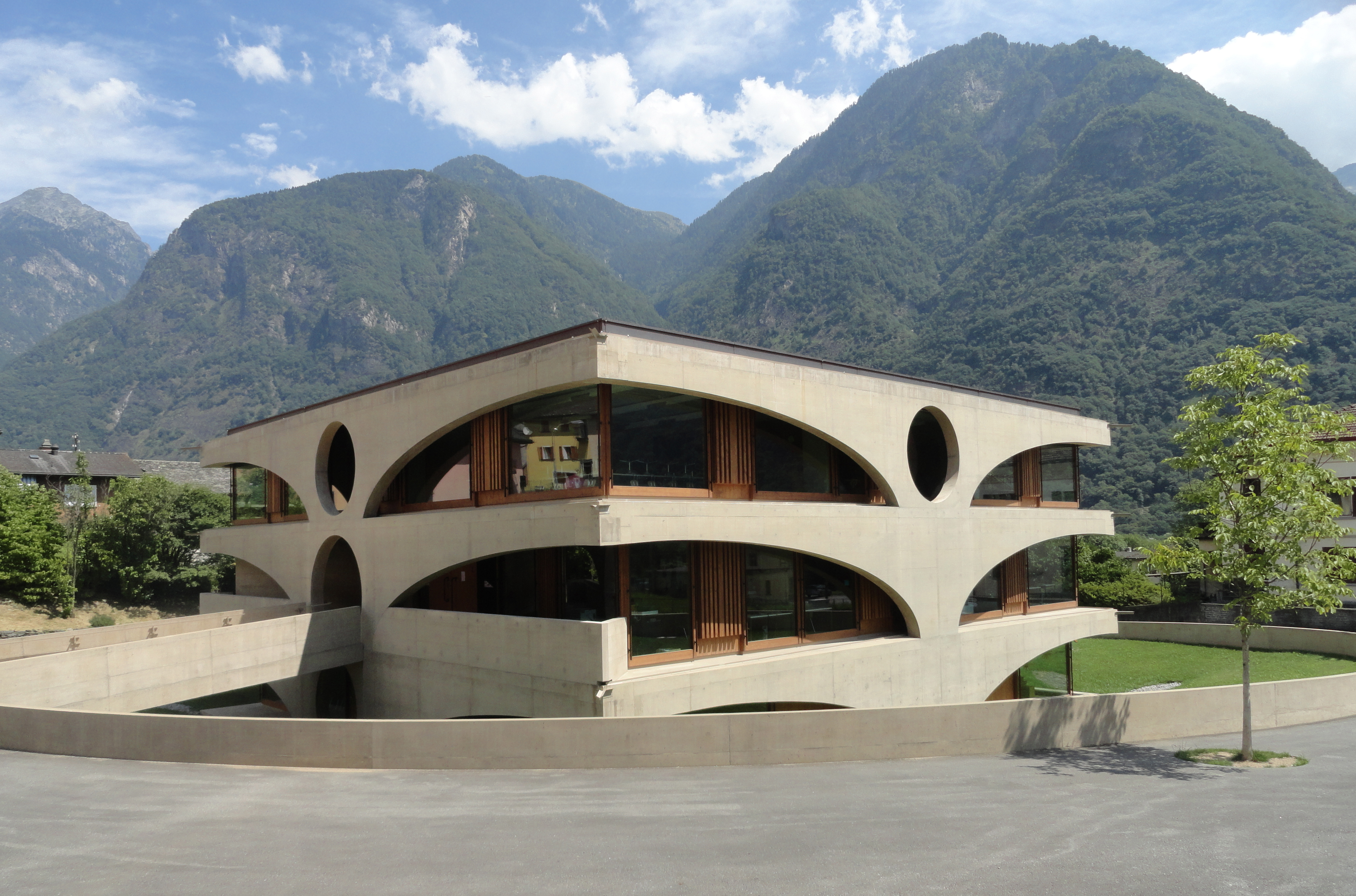
Schoolhouse by Raphael Zuber

- 2007–2011: Schoolhouse by Raphael Zuber

== Climate ==
Grono features an oceanic climate (Köppen: Cfb), closely bordering on a humid continental climate (Köppen: Dfb) with hot, humid summers and cold, somewhat dry but quite snowy winters.

The nationwide record temperature of 41.5 °C (106.7 °F) was registered in Grono during the 2003 European heat wave on 11 August 2003. In comparison, the coldest temperature ever measured in Switzerland was −41.8 °C (−43.2 °F) in La Brévine.

Between 1991 and 2020 Grono had an average of 99.7 days of rain per year and on average received 1,317 mm (51.9 in) of precipitation.

The wettest month was August during which time Grono received an average of 164 mm (6.5 in) of precipitation over 10.6 days.

The driest month of the year was February with an average of 49 mm (1.9 in) of precipitation over 4.6 days.

Climate data for Grono, elevation 324 m (1,063 ft), (1991–2020)
Month	Jan	Feb	Mar	Apr	May	Jun	Jul	Aug	Sep	Oct	Nov	Dec	Year
Mean daily maximum °C (°F)	6.0 (42.8)	8.8 (47.8)	14.0 (57.2)	17.6 (63.7)	21.2 (70.2)	25.2 (77.4)	27.5 (81.5)	26.8 (80.2)	22.0 (71.6)	16.7 (62.1)	10.6 (51.1)	6.1 (43.0)	16.9 (62.4)
Daily mean °C (°F)	0.8 (33.4)	2.8 (37.0)	7.3 (45.1)	11.0 (51.8)	14.8 (58.6)	18.5 (65.3)	20.4 (68.7)	19.9 (67.8)	15.6 (60.1)	11.0 (51.8)	5.7 (42.3)	1.2 (34.2)	10.8 (51.4)
Mean daily minimum °C (°F)	−2.5 (27.5)	−1.4 (29.5)	2.1 (35.8)	5.3 (41.5)	9.2 (48.6)	13.0 (55.4)	14.7 (58.5)	14.7 (58.5)	11.1 (52.0)	7.1 (44.8)	2.3 (36.1)	−1.9 (28.6)	6.1 (43.0)
Average precipitation mm (inches)	58.0 (2.28)	48.9 (1.93)	62.4 (2.46)	106.4 (4.19)	142.3 (5.60)	154.4 (6.08)	144.8 (5.70)	163.6 (6.44)	137.7 (5.42)	134.1 (5.28)	147.3 (5.80)	71.1 (2.80)	1,371 (53.98)
Average snowfall cm (inches)	24.5 (9.6)	10.4 (4.1)	5.0 (2.0)	0.7 (0.3)	0.0 (0.0)	0.0 (0.0)	0.0 (0.0)	0.0 (0.0)	0.0 (0.0)	0.4 (0.2)	3.7 (1.5)	19.0 (7.5)	63.7 (25.1)
Average precipitation days (≥ 1.0 mm)	5.4	4.6	5.9	8.7	12.1	10.8	9.8	10.6	8.5	8.5	8.8	6.0	99.7
Average snowy days (≥ 1.0 cm)	2.3	2.0	0.8	0.2	0.0	0.0	0.0	0.0	0.0	0.1	0.7	2.2	8.3
Average relative humidity (%)	72	65	61	64	71	72	71	74	77	82	78	75	72
Source 1: NOAA
Source 2: MeteoSwiss (snow 1981–2010)

== Economy ==
Grono is an industrial-tertiary municipality, a municipality where agriculture and manufacturing play a minor role in the economy. As of 2014, there were a total of 825 people employed in the municipality. Of these, a total of 6 people worked in 5 businesses in the primary economic sector. The secondary sector employed 343 workers in 35 separate businesses. A minority (21.3%) of the secondary sector employees worked in very small businesses. There were 7 small businesses with a total of 214 employees and one mid-sized business with a total of 56 employees. Finally, the tertiary sector provided 476 jobs in 131 businesses. There were two mid-sized businesses with a total of 137 employees. In 2014 a total of 2.% of the population received social assistance.

== Politics ==
In the 2015 federal election the most popular party was the SVP with 41.0% of the vote. The next three most popular parties were the SP (21.5%), the CVP (18.7%) and the FDP (10.3%). In the federal election, a total of 212 votes were cast, and the voter turnout was 35.7%. The 2015 election saw a large change in the voting when compared to 2011. The percentage that the CVP received dropped from 29.2% to 18.7%, while the percentage of the vote received by the SVP increased sharply from 22.2% in 2011 to 41.0%.

In the 2007 federal election the most popular party was the SVP which received 32.6% of the vote. The next three most popular parties were the SP (29.1%), the CVP (26.7%) and the FDP (10.9%).

== Education ==
In Grono about 56.4% of the population (between age 25–64) have completed either non-mandatory upper secondary education or additional higher education (either university or a Fachhochschule).

== Crime ==
In 2014 the crime rate, of the over 200 crimes listed in the Swiss Criminal Code (running from murder, robbery and assault to accepting bribes and election fraud), in Grono was 50.2 per thousand residents, slightly lower than the national average (64.6 per thousand). There were no drug crimes nor violations of immigration, visa and work permit laws.
