= Leggia =

- Former municipality
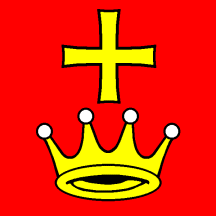
- Flag Coat of arms
- Location of Leggia
- Location within Switzerland Location within Canton of Graubünden
- Coordinates: 46°15′N 9°9′E
- Country: Switzerland
- Canton: Graubünden
- District: Moesa

Area
  - Total: 9.15 km^{2} (3.53 sq mi)
- Elevation: 337 m (1,106 ft)

Population (Dec 2015)
  - Total: 138
  - Density: 15.1/km^{2} (39.1/sq mi)
- Time zone: UTC+01:00 (CET)
  - Summer (DST): UTC+02:00 (CEST)
- Postal code: 6556
- SFOS number: 3833
- ISO 3166 code: CH-GR
- Surrounded by: Cama, Grono, Verdabbio
- Website: www.grono.ch

Leggia is a former municipality in the district of Moesa in the Swiss canton of Graubünden. On 1 January 2017, the former municipalities of Leggia and Verdabbio merged into the municipality of Grono.

== History ==
Leggia is first mentioned in 1295 as de Legia.

== Geography ==
Leggia had an area, as of 2006, of 9.2 km^{2} (3.6 sq mi). Of this area, 8.6% is used for agricultural purposes, while 63.9% is forested. Of the rest of the land, 2.7% is settled (buildings or roads) and the remainder (24.7%) is non-productive (rivers, glaciers or mountains).

The former municipality is located in the Roveredo sub-district of the Moesa district on the right bank of the Moesa river.

== Demographics ==
Leggia had a population (as of 2015) of 138. As of 2008, 6.7% of the population was made up of foreign nationals. Over the last 10 years the population has decreased at a rate of -16.8%. Most of the population (as of 2000) speaks Italian (84.3%), with German being second most common (11.8%) and Spanish being third (2.4%).

As of 2000, the gender distribution of the population was 50.0% male and 50.0% female. The age distribution, as of 2000, in Leggia is; 13 children or 10.2% of the population are between 0 and 9 years old. 7 teenagers or 5.5% are 10 to 14, and 7 teenagers or 5.5% are 15 to 19. Of the adult population, 12 people or 9.4% of the population are between 20 and 29 years old. 23 people or 18.1% are 30 to 39, 16 people or 12.6% are 40 to 49, and 15 people or 11.8% are 50 to 59. The senior population distribution is 17 people or 13.4% of the population are between 60 and 69 years old, 10 people or 7.9% are 70 to 79, there are 5 people or 3.9% who are 80 to 89, and there are 2 people or 1.6% who are 90 to 99.

In the 2007 federal election, the most popular party was the SP which received 32.3% of the vote. The next three most popular parties were the SVP (28.1%), the CVP (21.9%) and the FDP (17.7%).

In Leggia, about 55.1% of the population (between age 25-64) have completed either non-mandatory upper secondary education or additional higher education (either university or a Fachhochschule).

Leggia has an unemployment rate of 1.67%. As of 2005, there were 19 people employed in the primary economic sector and about 8 businesses involved in this sector. 14 people are employed in the secondary sector and there are 2 businesses in this sector. 2 people are employed in the tertiary sector, with 1 business in this sector.

The historical population is given in the following table:

year	population
1826	72
1850	103
1900	123
1950	138
2000	127
