= Vals Valley =

Coordinates: 46.698729°N 9.181566°E

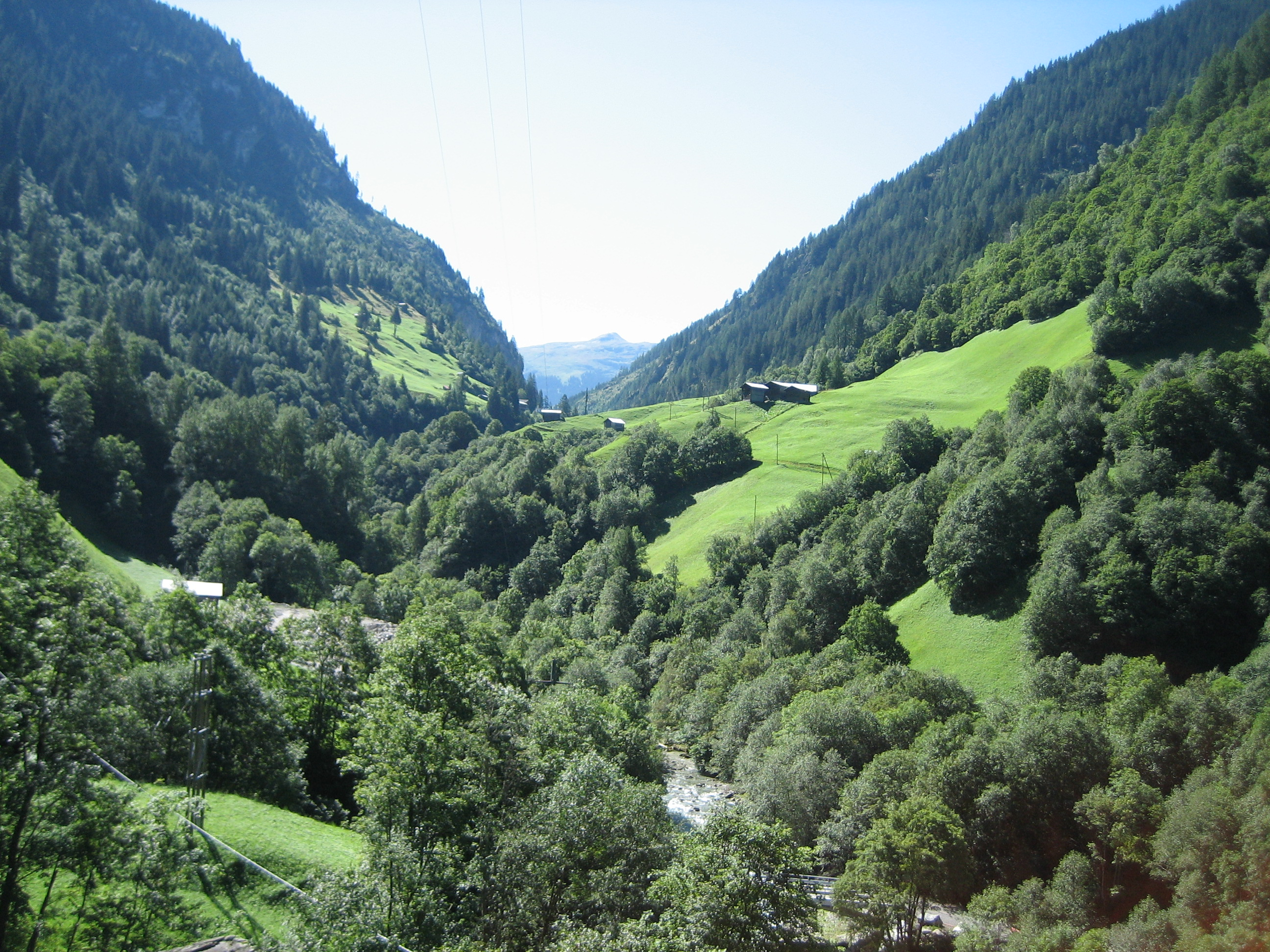
Valsertal

The Vals Valley (German: Valser Tal) is located in the canton of Graubünden in Switzerland.

== Geography ==
The Vals Valley is a roughly 16 kilometers long valley. At Uors, it branches off to the south from the Lumnezia. The valley is drained by the Valser Rhine. There are two municipalities in the valley: Vals and St. Martin.

The population is spread out across several hamlets and the village of Vals-Platz, which has an altitude of 1250 m. They form a Walser enclave, since the people in the adjacent Lumnezia speak Romansh.

== History ==
Isolated finds show that the Vals Valley was used as a link between the Mesolcina and the Alpine Rhine Valley as early as the Bronze Age.

The lower part of the valley was settled in the 12th Century, if not earlier. Low justice was provided by the court in Sagogn; high justice by the barons of Belmont. In the 14th century, the upper part of the valley was settled by the Walser migration.

== Tourism ==
Therme Vals, the only hot spring in Graubünden where hot water springs straight from the ground, is located in the valley. Peiden-Bad, in the Lumnezia, is a former spa.

== Gallery ==
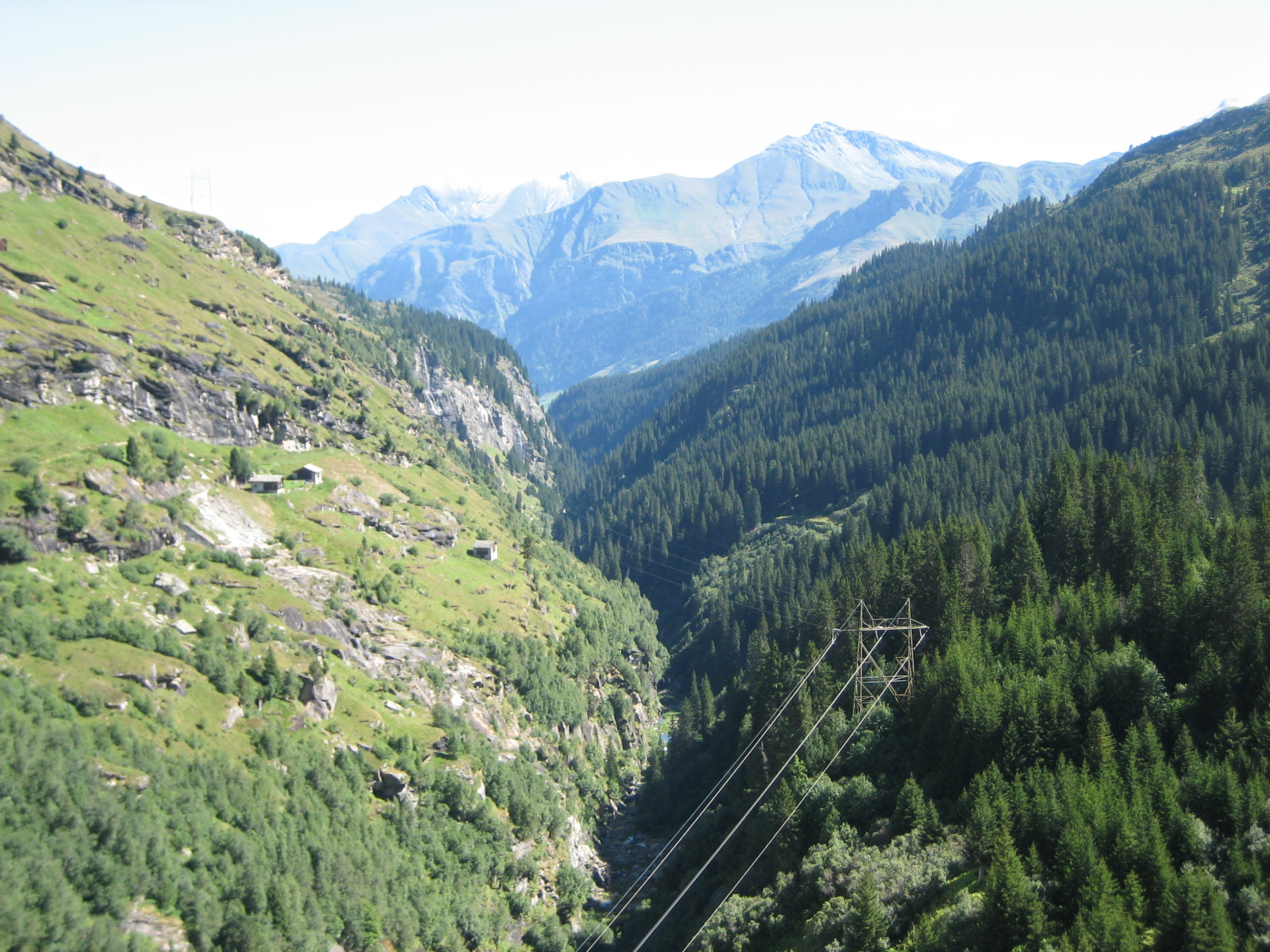
Upper Vals Valley

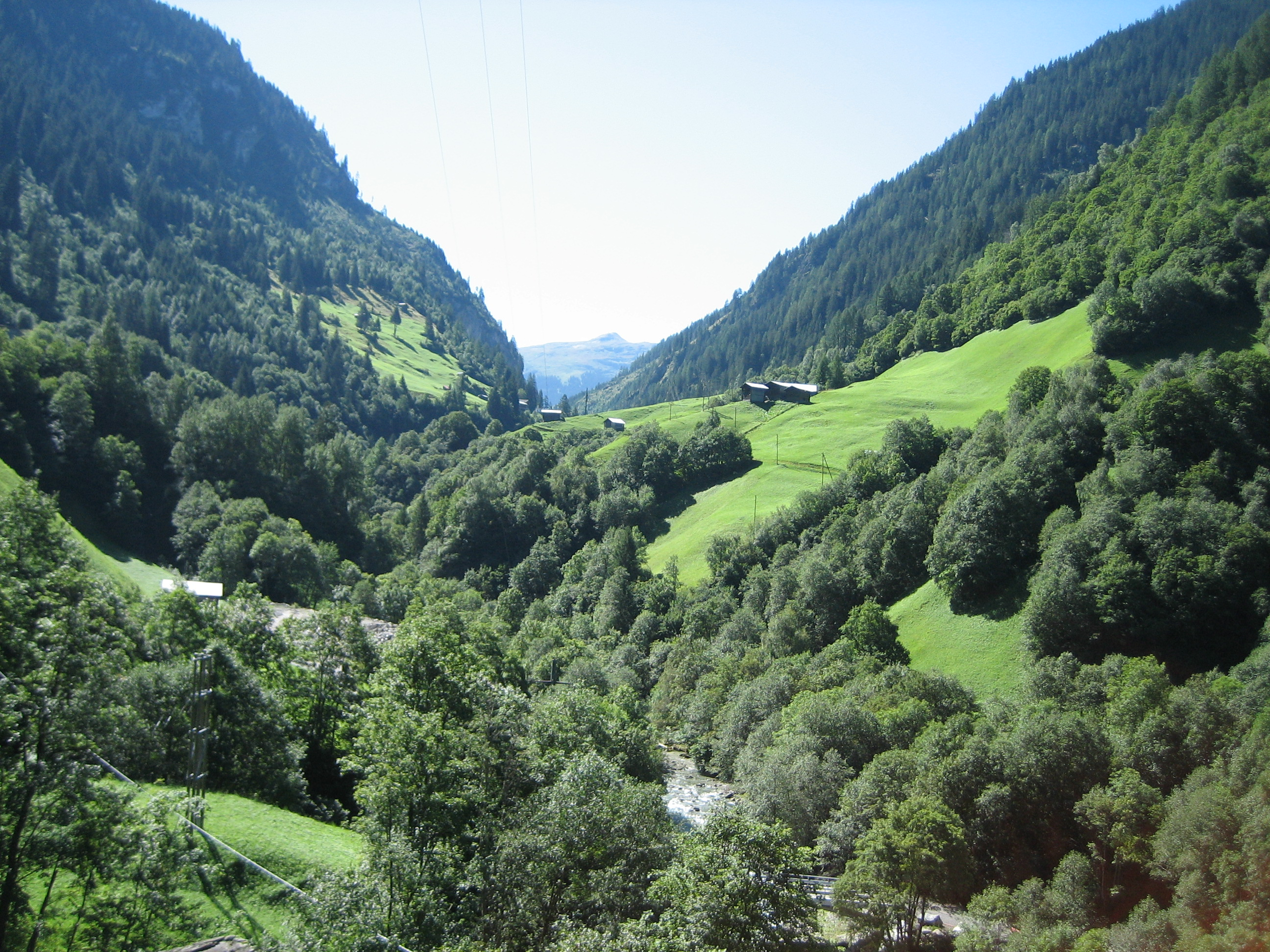
Vals Valley

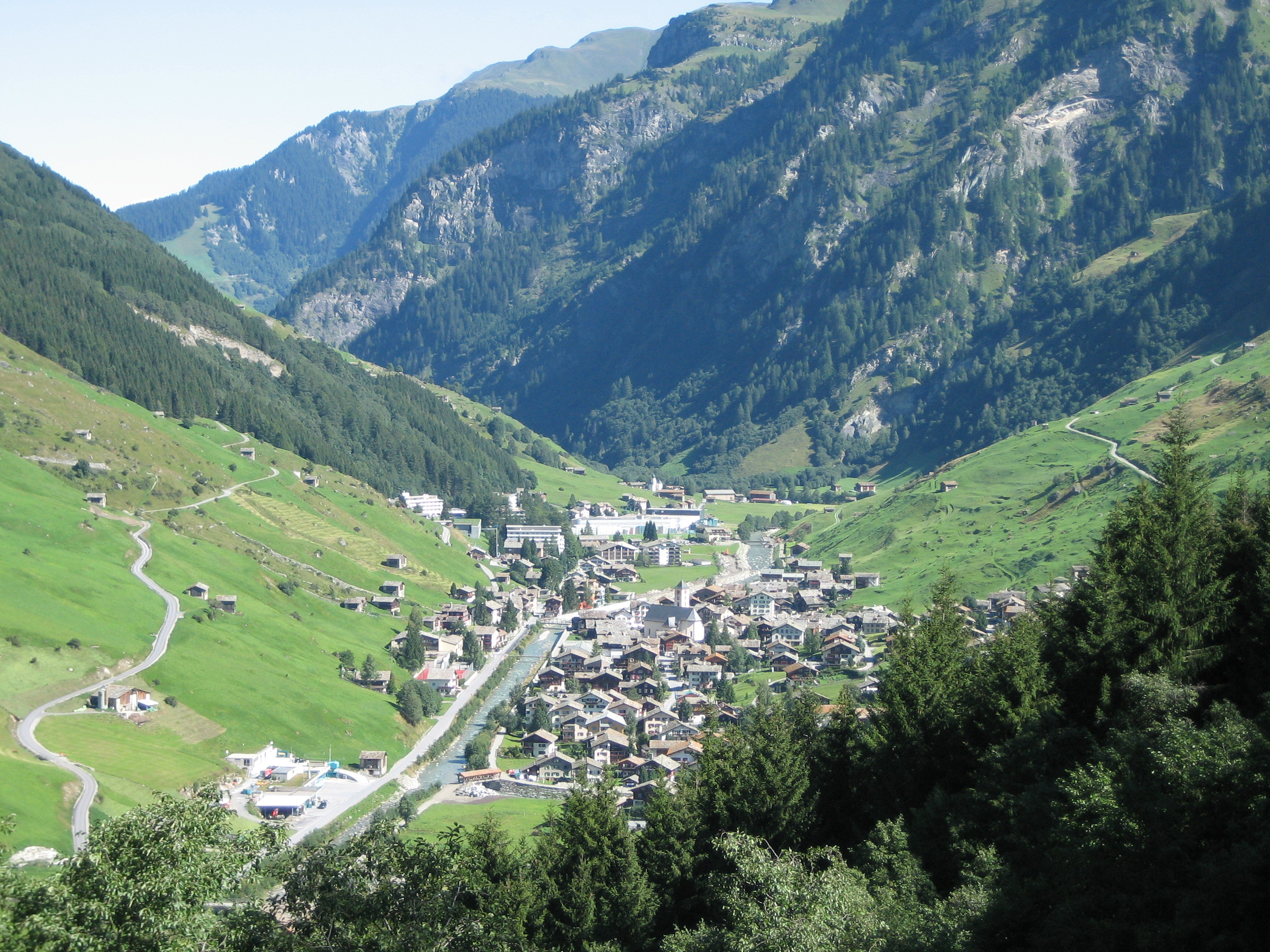
The village Vals
