= Cama, Switzerland =

Cama
- Municipality
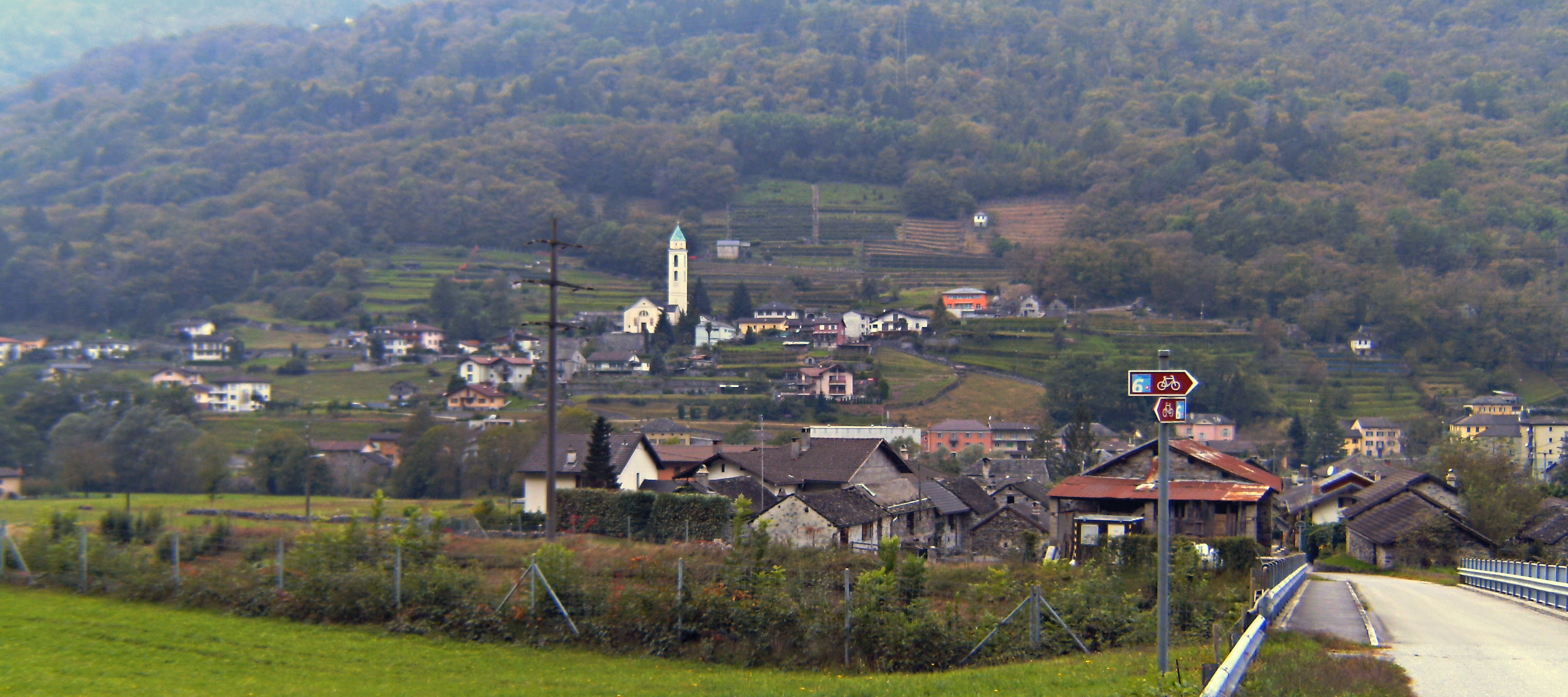

- Flag Coat of arms
- Location of Cama
- Location within Switzerland Location within Canton of Grisons
- Coordinates: 46°16′N 9°10′E
- Country: Switzerland
- Canton: Grisons
- District: Moesa

Area
  - Total: 15.06 km^{2} (5.81 sq mi)
- Elevation: 366 m (1,201 ft)

Population (December 2020)
  - Total: 589
  - Density: 39.1/km^{2} (101/sq mi)
- Time zone: UTC+01:00 (CET)
  - Summer (DST): UTC+02:00 (CEST)
- Postal code: 6557
- SFOS number: 3831
- ISO 3166 code: CH-GR
- Surrounded by: Dosso del Liro (IT-CO), Gordona (IT-SO), Grono, Leggia, Livo (IT-CO), Lostallo, Verdabbio
- Website: http://www.valcama.ch SFSO statistics

Cama is a municipality in the Moesa Region in the Swiss canton of the Grisons.

== History ==
Cama is first mentioned in 1219 as Camma.

Between 1907 and 1978, Mesocco was linked to Bellinzona and the Gotthard railway to the south, and Mesocco to the north, by the Bellinzona–Mesocco railway. The section between Cama and Castione-Arbedo station, on the Gotthard line, remained open for freight until 2003, and is now operated as a tourist railway.

== Geography ==
Cama has an area, as of 2006, of 15.1 km^{2} (5.8 sq mi). Of this area, 4.2% is used for agricultural purposes, while 60.1% is forested. Of the rest of the land, 2.7% is settled (buildings or roads) and the remainder (33.1%) is non-productive (rivers, glaciers or mountains).

Before 2017, the municipality was located in the Moesa district in the Roveredo sub-district, along both banks of the Moesa river. It consists of the village of Cama and the sections of Al Pont and Norantola.

Lago di Cama is located in the municipality.

== Demographics ==
Cama has a population (as of 31 December 2020) of 589. As of 2008, 13.6% of the population was made up of foreign nationals. Over the last 10 years the population has grown at a rate of 3%.

As of 2000, the gender distribution of the population was 49.1% male and 50.9% female. The age distribution, as of 2000, in Cama is; 53 children or 11.2% of the population are between 0 and 9 years old. 16 teenagers or 3.4% are 10 to 14, and 15 teenagers or 3.2% are 15 to 19. Of the adult population, 67 people or 14.1% of the population are between 20 and 29 years old. 80 people or 16.9% are 30 to 39, 69 people or 14.6% are 40 to 49, and 67 people or 14.1% are 50 to 59. The senior population distribution is 53 people or 11.2% of the population are between 60 and 69 years old, 38 people or 8.0% are 70 to 79, there are 16 people or 3.4% who are 80 to 89.

In the 2007 federal election the most popular party was the SVP which received 35.3% of the vote. The next three most popular parties were the CVP (32%), the FDP (17.4%) and the SP (15.3%).

The entire Swiss population is generally well educated. In Cama about 64.5% of the population (between age 25-64) have completed either non-mandatory upper secondary education or additional higher education (either University or a Fachhochschule).

Cama has an unemployment rate of 2.56%. As of 2005, there were 34 people employed in the primary economic sector and about 13 businesses involved in this sector. 46 people are employed in the secondary sector and there are 8 businesses in this sector. 93 people are employed in the tertiary sector, with 18 businesses in this sector.

The historical population is given in the following table:

year	population
1826	171
1850	214
1860	272
1900	250
1950	254
2000	474

== Languages ==
Most of the population (as of 2000) speaks Italian (88.2%), with German being second most common ( 5.1%) and Portuguese being third ( 2.3%).

Languages in Cama
Languages	Census 1980		Census 1990		Census 2000	
Languages	Number	Percent	Number	Percent	Number	Percent
German	10	2.83%	18	4.81%	24	5.06%
Italian	328	92.92%	347	92.78%	418	88.19%
Population	353	100%	374	100%	474	100%
