= Glogn =

River in Switzerland

Glogn German: Glenner
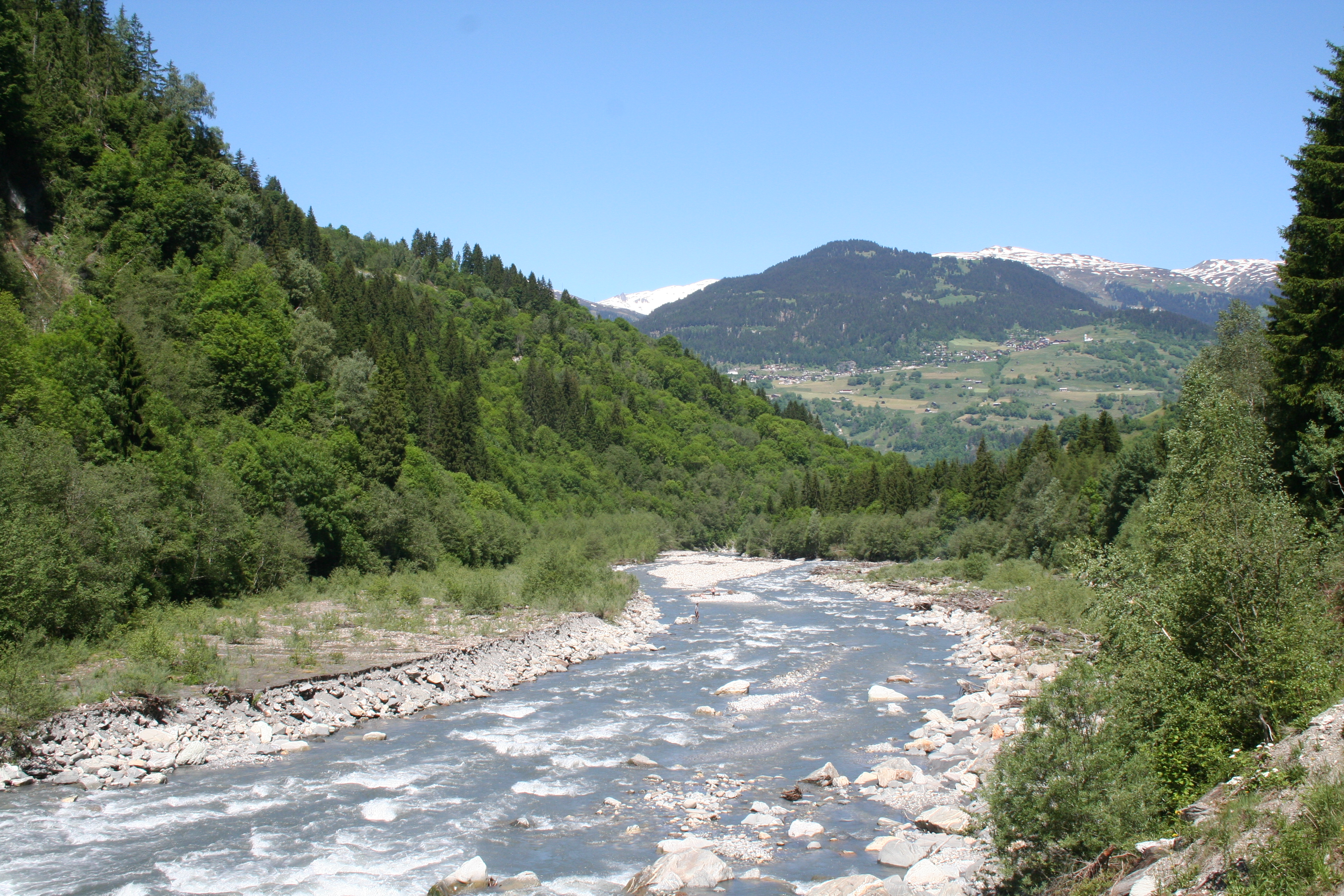
- Glogn/Glenner above Ilanz
- Native name: Glogn (German)

Location
- Country: Switzerland
- Canton: The Grisons
- Cities: Ilanz

Physical characteristics
- Source
  - location: Alp Scharboda, Piz Terri
  - coordinates: 46°36′7″N 9°4′8″E
  - elevation: 2,500 m (8,200 ft)
- Mouth
  - location: Confluence with Vorderrhein at Ilanz
  - coordinates: 46°46′36″N 9°12′44″E
  - elevation: 688 m (2,257 ft)
- Length: 30.7 km (19.1 mi)

Basin features
- Progression: Vorderrhein→ Rhine→ North Sea
- Tributaries
  - right: Valser Rhine

The Glogn (Romansh, German: Glenner) is a whitewater river in Graubünden. Glenner was also the name of a district in this area, which was annexed by Surselva District in 2001.

The river rises near the border with Ticino and is surrounded by up to 3100m high mountains. The river flows through the Lumnezia. In Suraua, the Vals Rhine flows into the Glogn. After a few more kilometers, the Glogn flows into the Vorderrhein at Ilanz. In the upper reaches of the river has cut a deep gorge, which has uncovered black shale in a few places. During the snow melt and after rains the river water is usually dark gray.

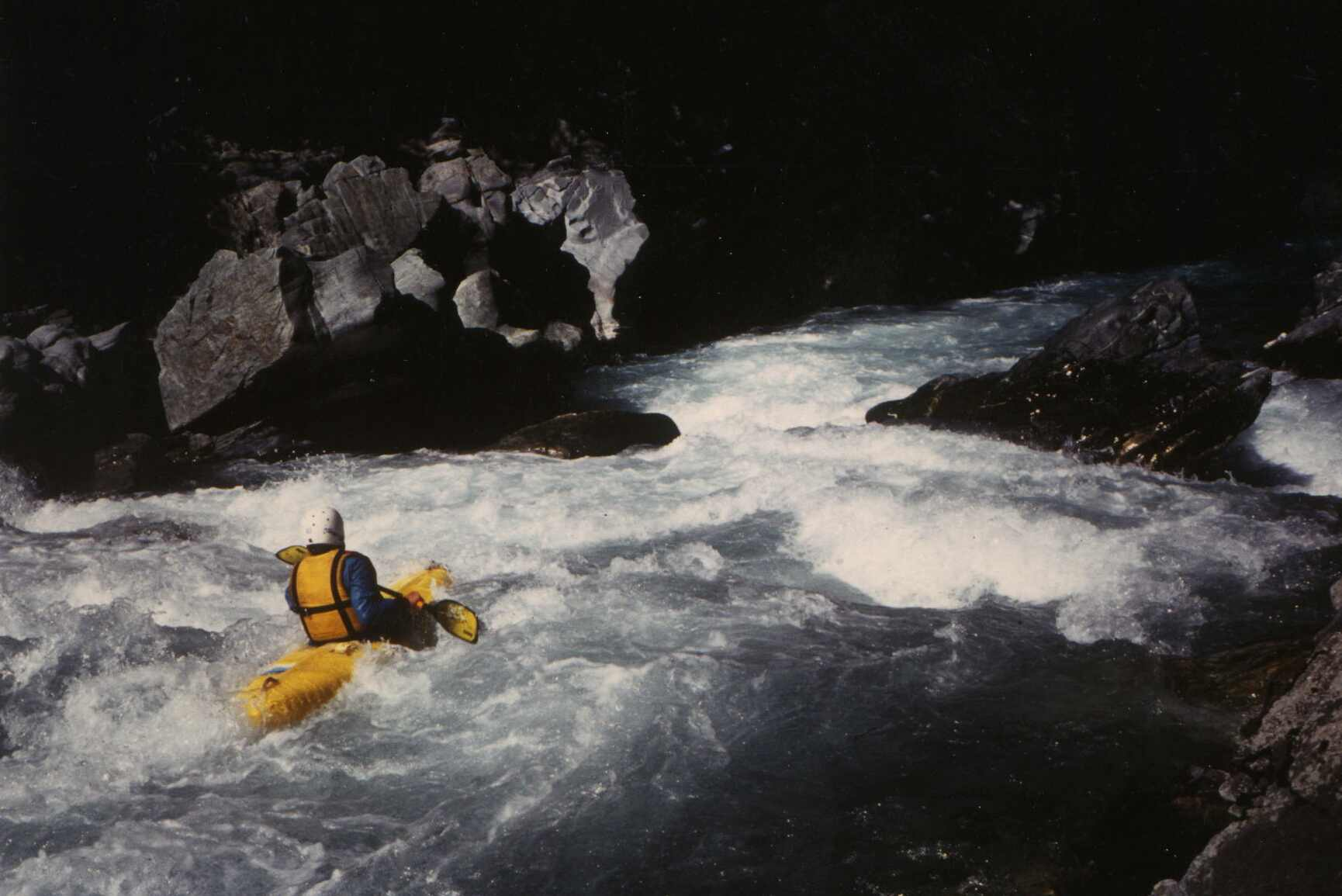
Kajkaking on the lower reaches at Pitasch
