= Verdabbio =

- Former municipality
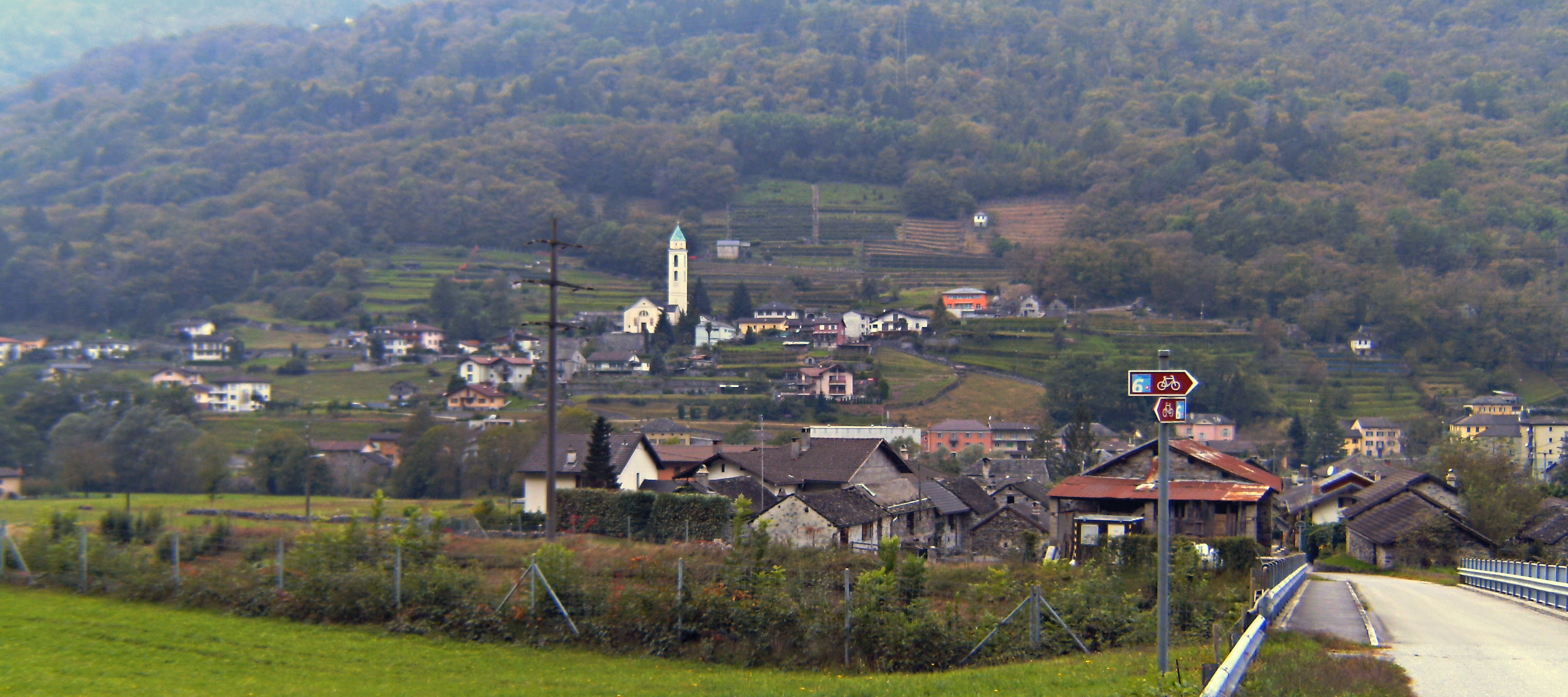

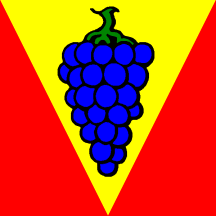
- Flag Coat of arms
- Location of Verdabbio
- Location within Switzerland Location within Canton of Graubünden
- Coordinates: 46°16′N 9°09′E
- Country: Switzerland
- Canton: Graubünden
- District: Moesa

Government
  - Mayor: Antonio Spadini

Area
  - Total: 13.11 km^{2} (5.06 sq mi)
- Elevation: 604 m (1,982 ft)

Population (Dec 2015)
  - Total: 163
  - Density: 12.4/km^{2} (32.2/sq mi)
- Time zone: UTC+01:00 (CET)
  - Summer (DST): UTC+02:00 (CEST)
- Postal code: 6538
- SFOS number: 3836
- ISO 3166 code: CH-GR
- Surrounded by: Cama, Castaneda, Cauco, Gordona (IT-SO), Grono, Leggia, Lostallo, Santa Maria in Calanca
- Website: www.grono.ch

Verdabbio is a former municipality in the district of Moesa in the Swiss canton of Graubünden. On 1 January 2017 the former municipalities of Leggia and Verdabbio merged into the municipality of Grono.

== History ==
Verdabbio is first mentioned in 1203 as Vertabio.

== Geography ==
Verdabbio had an area, as of 2006, of 13.1 km^{2} (5.1 sq mi). Of this area, 4.9% is used for agricultural purposes, while 62.1% is forested. Of the rest of the land, 1.1% is settled (buildings or roads) and the remainder (31.9%) is non-productive (rivers, glaciers or mountains).

The former municipality is located in the Roveredo sub-district of the Moesa district.

== Demographics ==
Verdabbio had a population (as of 2015) of 163. As of 2008, 11.8% of the population was made up of foreign nationals. Over the last 10 years the population has decreased at a rate of -1.9%. Most of the population (as of 2000) speaks Italian (85.4%), with German being second most common (14.0%).

As of 2000, the gender distribution of the population was 47.2% male and 52.8% female. The age distribution, as of 2000, in Verdabbio is; 18 children or 11.0% of the population are between 0 and 9 years old. 8 teenagers or 4.9% are 10 to 14, and 10 teenagers or 6.1% are 15 to 19. Of the adult population, 13 people or 7.9% of the population are between 20 and 29 years old. 35 people or 21.3% are 30 to 39, 17 people or 10.4% are 40 to 49, and 33 people or 20.1% are 50 to 59. The senior population distribution is 11 people or 6.7% of the population are between 60 and 69 years old, 11 people or 6.7% are 70 to 79, there are 7 people or 4.3% who are 80 to 89, and there is 1 person who is 90 to 99.

In the 2007 federal election the most popular party was the SP which received 47% of the vote. The next three most popular parties were the CVP (24.4%), the SVP (18.5%) and the FDP (10.1%).

In Verdabbio about 59.8% of the population (between age 25–64) have completed either non-mandatory upper secondary education or additional higher education (either university or a Fachhochschule).

Verdabbio has an unemployment rate of 2.68%. As of 2005, there were 8 people employed in the primary economic sector and about 3 businesses involved in this sector. 2 people are employed in the secondary sector and there are 2 businesses in this sector. 11 people are employed in the tertiary sector, with 7 businesses in this sector.

The historical population is given in the following table:

year	population
1850	198
1900	185
1950	177
1960	154
1970	159
1980	156
1990	143
2000	164
