= Moesa (river) =

Tributary of the Ticino river

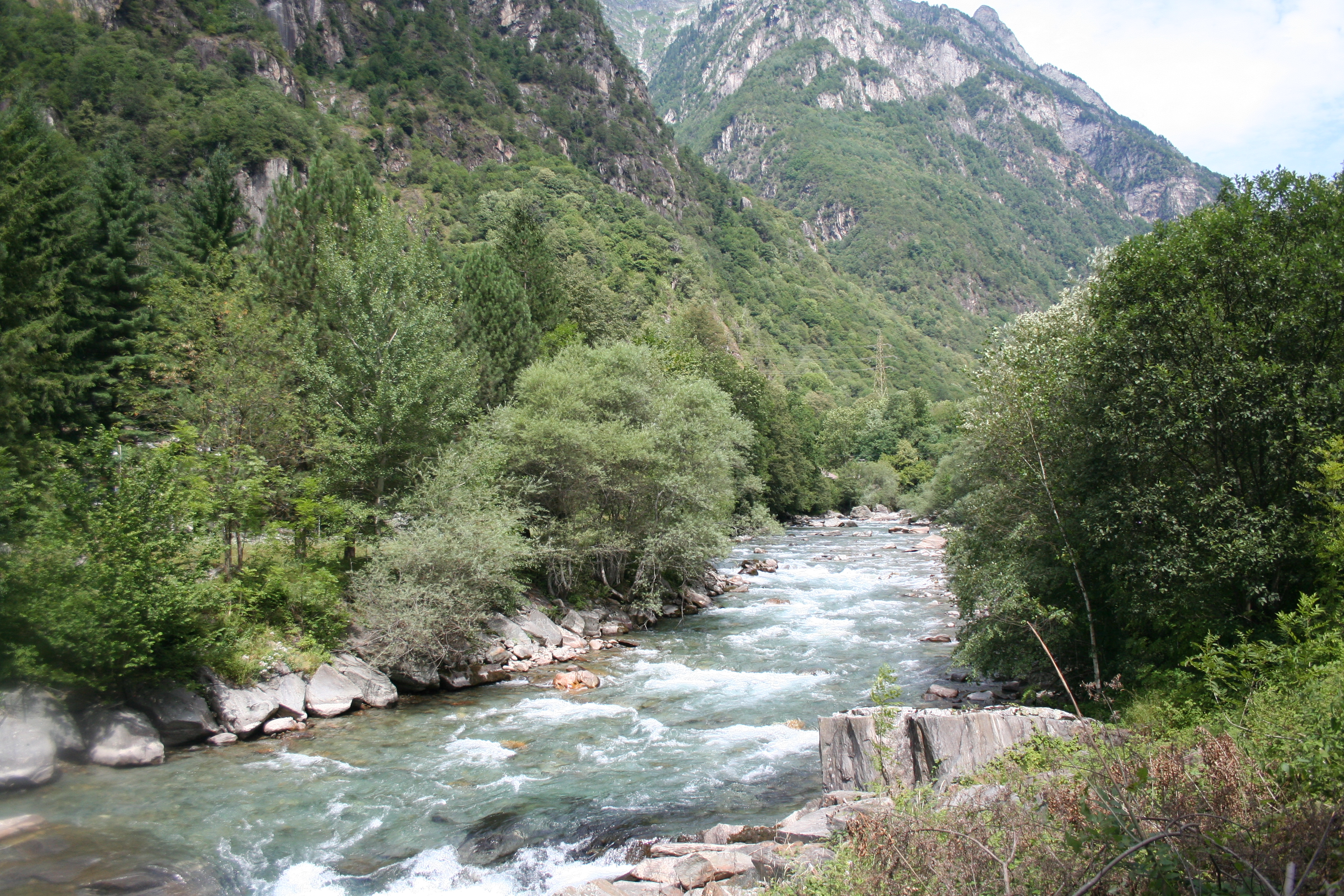
- near Cama GR

Location
- Country: Switzerland

Physical characteristics
- Source
  - location: Val Vignun
- Mouth: Ticino
  - coordinates: 46.2184°N 9.0393°E
- Length: 47 km (29 mi)

Basin features
- Progression: Ticino→ Po→ Adriatic Sea

The Moesa is a 47-kilometre (29 mi) river, a tributary of the Ticino, which flows through the Swiss cantons of Grisons and Ticino.

It rises in Val Vignun near the San Bernardino Pass and descends, along with the A13 motorway, through the Val Mesolcina towards Roveredo, where it receives the rivers Calancasca and Traversagna. Near Arbedo-Castione the Moesa flows into the Ticino.

The Moesa is a popular river for kayaking.

== Sources ==
This article originated as a translation of Moesa in the Italian Wikipedia.
