= List of cultural property of national significance in Switzerland: Thurgau =

This list contains all cultural property of national significance (class A) in the canton of Thurgau from the 2009 Swiss Inventory of Cultural Property of National and Regional Significance. It is sorted by municipality.

The geographic coordinates provided are in the Swiss coordinate system as given in the Inventory.

== Aadorf ==
KGS No.^{?}	Picture	Name	Street Address	CH1903 X coordinate	CH1903 Y coordinate	Location
8589		Agrotechnorama Tänikon	Tänikon	710.651	259.829	47.479915°N 8.90669°E
5053	Former Monastery Church of St Bernhard	Former Monastery Church of St Bernhard	Tänikon	710.685	259.781	47.479477°N 8.907129°E

== Altnau ==
KGS No.^{?}	Picture	Name	Street Address	CH1903 X coordinate	CH1903 Y coordinate	Location
Unknown		ISOS Village: Altnau				

== Amlikon-Bissegg ==
KGS No.^{?}	Picture	Name	Street Address	CH1903 X coordinate	CH1903 Y coordinate	Location
Unknown		ISOS Hamlet: Leutmerken				
Unknown		ISOS Spezialfall: Griesenberg				

== Amriswil ==
KGS No.^{?}	Picture	Name	Street Address	CH1903 X coordinate	CH1903 Y coordinate	Location
10150	Bohlenständerhaus Schrofen	Bohlenständerhaus Schrofen	Kreuzlingerstrasse 66	738.106	268.273	47.550647°N 9.273451°E
8540		Kutschensammlung Sallmann	St Gallerstrasse 12	739.944	267.454	47.542894°N 9.297603°E
4910	Hagenwil Castle	Hagenwil Castle	Hagenwil 1	740.554	265.937	47.529124°N 9.305224°E
Unknown		ISOS Village: Hagenwil bei Amriswil				

== Arbon ==
KGS No.^{?}	Picture	Name	Street Address	CH1903 X coordinate	CH1903 Y coordinate	Location
4917		Bleiche, Prehistoric Lake Shore Settlement		749.850	263.350	47.50381°N 9.427758°E
10232	Gallus Chapel	Gallus Chapel	Gallusgasse 4	750.569	264.608	47.514956°N 9.437723°E
10234	Catholic Church of St Martin	Catholic Church of St Martin	Bahnhofstrasse 7	750.530	264.633	47.51519°N 9.437214°E
4918/extendedHtmlPopup 10646, 4918	Arbon Castle and Historical Museum	Arbon Castle and Historical Museum	Schloss 4	750.511	264.685	47.515662°N 9.436979°E
9676	Late-Roman Fortress	Late-Roman Fortress		750.560	264.600	47.514887°N 9.437601°E
Unknown		ISOS Kleinstadt / Flecken: Arbon				
Unknown		ISOS hamlet: Kratzern				

== Berg ==
KGS No.^{?}	Picture	Name	Street Address	CH1903 X coordinate	CH1903 Y coordinate	Location
Unknown		ISOS hamlet: Hard				
Unknown		ISOS hamlet: Kehlhof				

== Berlingen ==
KGS No.^{?}	Picture	Name	Street Address	CH1903 X coordinate	CH1903 Y coordinate	Location
Unknown		ISOS Village: Berlingen				

== Bettwiesen ==
KGS No.^{?}	Picture	Name	Street Address	CH1903 X coordinate	CH1903 Y coordinate	Location
4934	Bettwiesen Castle	Bettwiesen Castle		719.878	261.798	47.496003°N 9.029607°E

== Bischofszell ==
KGS No.^{?}	Picture	Name	Street Address	CH1903 X coordinate	CH1903 Y coordinate	Location
4937	Daller House	Daller House	Kirchgasse 5	735.749	261.831	47.493215°N 9.240183°E
4938	Double House Rebstock / Rosenstock	Double House Rebstock / Rosenstock	Marktgasse 7	735.725	261.899	47.493831°N 9.239886°E
4939	Former Paper Factory with Paper Machine PM1	Former Paper Factory with Paper Machine PM1	Fabrikstrasse 26	735.364	261.800	47.493016°N 9.235066°E
8457/extendedHtmlPopup 4940, 8457	Houses and the map collection of the Dr. Albert Knoepfli collection in the Museum Bischofszell	Houses and the map collection of the Dr. Albert Knoepfli collection in the Museum Bischofszell	Marktgasse 4, 6	735.758	261.879	47.493645°N 9.240317°E
4941	Catholic Church of St Pelagius with Michaels Chapel	Catholic Church of St Pelagius with Michaels Chapel	Kirchgasse 16	735.628	261.900	47.49386°N 9.238599°E
4942	Rathaus (Town council house)	Rathaus (Town council house)	Marktgasse 11	735.712	261.916	47.493987°N 9.239718°E
4943	Alte Thurbrücke	Alte Thurbrücke		735.160	261.647	47.491682°N 9.232313°E
Unknown		ISOS Kleinstadt / Flecken: Bischofszell				

== Bürglen ==
KGS No.^{?}	Picture	Name	Street Address	CH1903 X coordinate	CH1903 Y coordinate	Location
Unknown		ISOS Kleinstadt / Flecken: Bürglen				

== Bussnang ==
KGS No.^{?}	Picture	Name	Street Address	CH1903 X coordinate	CH1903 Y coordinate	Location
Unknown		ISOS Hamlet: Wertbühl				

== Diessenhofen ==
KGS No.^{?}	Picture	Name	Street Address	CH1903 X coordinate	CH1903 Y coordinate	Location
4961	Unterhof Castle	Unterhof Castle	Kirchgasse 15	698.282	282.979	47.690053°N 8.747736°E
11770		Town Archive in the Rathaus (Town council house)	Hintergasse 49	698.610	282.966	47.689887°N 8.752101°E
5213	Former Dominican Monastery of St. Katharinental	Former Dominican Monastery of St. Katharinental	Willisdorf	697.428	283.132	47.691556°N 8.736397°E
8455/extendedHtmlPopup 4956, 8455	Zum Goldenen Löwen House and Goldener Leuen Collection	Zum Goldenen Löwen House and Goldener Leuen Collection	Hauptstrasse 8	698.449	282.902	47.689336°N 8.749943°E
9055	Granary of the former Dominican Monastery of St. Katharinental	Granary of the former Dominican Monastery of St. Katharinental	Willisdorf	697.211	283.068	47.691013°N 8.733493°E
4955	Rheinbrücke (Rhine Bridge)	Rheinbrücke (Rhine Bridge)	Rheinhalde	698.510	283.058	47.690729°N 8.75079°E
10235	City Walls with Siegelturm	City Walls with Siegelturm		698.590	282.893	47.689233°N 8.751819°E
Unknown		ISOS Kleinstadt / Flecken: Diessenhofen				
Unknown		ISOS Spezialfall: St Katharinental				

== Egnach ==
KGS No.^{?}	Picture	Name	Street Address	CH1903 X coordinate	CH1903 Y coordinate	Location
4975	Bohlenständerhaus	Bohlenständerhaus	Erdhausen	744.892	266.611	47.534242°N 9.363031°E
4969		Farm House Schär mit Speicher	Ackermannshub	744.199	266.649	47.534736°N 9.353843°E
Unknown		ISOS Village: Steinebrunn				
Unknown		ISOS Spezialfall: Kulturlandschaft Balgen				

== Erlen ==
KGS No.^{?}	Picture	Name	Street Address	CH1903 X coordinate	CH1903 Y coordinate	Location
Unknown		ISOS Verstädtertes Village: Erlen-Eppishausen				

== Ermatingen ==
KGS No.^{?}	Picture	Name	Street Address	CH1903 X coordinate	CH1903 Y coordinate	Location
10236	Gasthaus Adler	Gasthaus Adler	Fruthwilerstrasse 2	723.244	281.119	47.66911°N 9.079625°E
10237	Kehlhof	Kehlhof	Kehlhofstrasse 8	723.219	281.193	47.66978°N 9.079313°E
4989	Paritätische Church of St Albin	Paritätische Church of St Albin	Kirchgasse	723.300	281.200	47.669827°N 9.080393°E
4994		Westerfeld / Büge (prehistoric shoreline settlement)		722.670	281.550	47.673093°N 9.072104°E
Unknown		ISOS Village: Ermatingen				
Unknown		ISOS Village: Triboltingen				
Unknown		ISOS Spezialfall: Untersee (Ermatingen, Gottlieben, Kreuzlingen, Salenstein, Tägerwilen)				

== Eschenz ==
KGS No.^{?}	Picture	Name	Street Address	CH1903 X coordinate	CH1903 Y coordinate	Location
10238	Werd Island (Prehistoric Shoreline Settlement / Roman Vicus / Roman Bridge)	Werd Island (Prehistoric Shoreline Settlement / Roman Vicus / Roman Bridge)		707.250	279.300	47.655565°N 8.866274°E
4996	Freudenfels Castle	Freudenfels Castle		709.070	277.490	47.63899°N 8.89005°E
4995	Pilgrimage Chapel St Otmar	Pilgrimage Chapel St Otmar	Insel Werd	707.306	279.254	47.655143°N 8.867008°E
Unknown		ISOS Spezialfall: Eschenzer (Eschenz, Mammern)				

== Fischingen ==
KGS No.^{?}	Picture	Name	Street Address	CH1903 X coordinate	CH1903 Y coordinate	Location
5005	St Martins Chapel	St Martins Chapel	Oberwangen	715.780	254.354	47.429799°N 8.973302°E
10239	Catholic Church of Dussnang	Catholic Church of Dussnang	Kurhausstrasse	714.967	254.386	47.430229°N 8.962537°E
5003	Benedictine Fischingen Abbey (now Priory) with Church and Idda Chapel	Benedictine Fischingen Abbey (now Priory) with Church and Idda Chapel		715.479	252.389	47.412181°N 8.968806°E
10486	Ruins of Tannegg Castle	Ruins of Tannegg Castle		714.060	254.390	47.430423°N 8.950518°E
Unknown		ISOS Spezialfall: Monastery Fischingen				

== Frauenfeld ==
KGS No.^{?}	Picture	Name	Street Address	CH1903 X coordinate	CH1903 Y coordinate	Location
11612		Archive of the Amtes für Denkmalpflege in Canton Thurgau	Ringstrasse 16	710.202	268.288	47.556056°N 8.902827°E
10527/extendedHtmlPopup 5015, 10527		Archive of the Department of Archeology	Schlossmühlestrasse 15a	709.818	268.000	47.55353°N 8.897655°E
8882		Citizen's Archive of Frauenfeld	Stadtgartenweg 1	709.945	267.802	47.551729°N 8.899293°E
9346		Cantonal Library Thurgau	Promenadenstrasse 12	709.946	268.300	47.556207°N 8.899429°E
5016	Catholic City Church	Catholic City Church	Zürcherstrasse 181	709.830	268.400	47.557125°N 8.897913°E
8456/extendedHtmlPopup 8584, 8456		Museum of Archeology and Natural History of the Canton of Thurgau	Freie-Strasse 26	709.884	268.340	47.556577°N 8.898616°E
5018	Simultaneum Church of St Laurenzen with St Anna Chapel and Messmerhaus	Simultaneum Church of St Laurenzen with St Anna Chapel and Messmerhaus	Oberkirchstrasse	710.917	268.953	47.561915°N 8.912491°E
5019	Rathaus (Town council house)	Rathaus (Town council house)	Rathausplatz 4	709.805	268.201	47.55534°N 8.897532°E
8464/extendedHtmlPopup 5020, 8464	Frauenfeld Castle and Historical Museum of the Canton of Thurgau	Frauenfeld Castle and Historical Museum of the Canton of Thurgau	Rathausplatz 2	709.756	268.183	47.555186°N 8.896877°E
8818		State Archives of the Canton of Thurgau	Zürcherstrasse 221	710.015	268.615	47.559028°N 8.900424°E
Unknown		ISOS Stadt: Frauenfeld				

== Gachnang ==
KGS No.^{?}	Picture	Name	Street Address	CH1903 X coordinate	CH1903 Y coordinate	Location
5125	Egelsee (prehistoric shore front settlement)	Egelsee (prehistoric shore front settlement)		707.125	268.400	47.557572°N 8.86198°E
5076	Former Manufaktur Greuterhof mit Scheune	Former Manufaktur Greuterhof mit Scheune	Islikon	705.531	266.928	47.544593°N 8.840456°E

== Gottlieben ==
KGS No.^{?}	Picture	Name	Street Address	CH1903 X coordinate	CH1903 Y coordinate	Location
5048	Gottlieben Castle	Gottlieben Castle	Am Schlosspark 4	727.491	280.644	47.664027°N 9.136021°E
Unknown		ISOS Spezialfall: Gottlieben				
Unknown		ISOS Spezialfall: Untersee (Ermatingen, Gottlieben, Kreuzlingen, Salenstein, Tägerwilen)				

== Hauptwil-Gottshaus ==
KGS No.^{?}	Picture	Name	Street Address	CH1903 X coordinate	CH1903 Y coordinate	Location
10241	Former Tavern Zur Traube	Former Tavern Zur Traube	Hauptwil, Türmlistrasse 3	736.583	260.448	47.480607°N 9.250824°E
5056	Hauptwil Castle	Hauptwil Castle		736.654	260.430	47.48043°N 9.25176°E
10243	Tortürmli	Tortürmli	Schloss	736.604	260.418	47.480333°N 9.251093°E
Unknown		ISOS Village: Hauptwil				

== Herdern ==
KGS No.^{?}	Picture	Name	Street Address	CH1903 X coordinate	CH1903 Y coordinate	Location
5059	Liebenfels Castle	Liebenfels Castle		711.777	276.693	47.631368°N 8.925863°E
Unknown		ISOS Spezialfall: Liebenfels				

== Hohentannen ==
KGS No.^{?}	Picture	Name	Street Address	CH1903 X coordinate	CH1903 Y coordinate	Location
Unknown		ISOS Spezialfall: Oetlishausen				

== Homburg ==
KGS No.^{?}	Picture	Name	Street Address	CH1903 X coordinate	CH1903 Y coordinate	Location
Unknown		ISOS Hamlet: Gündelhart				

== Hüttlingen ==
KGS No.^{?}	Picture	Name	Street Address	CH1903 X coordinate	CH1903 Y coordinate	Location
Unknown		ISOS Village: Hüttlingen				

== Hüttwilen ==
KGS No.^{?}	Picture	Name	Street Address	CH1903 X coordinate	CH1903 Y coordinate	Location
5073	Former Cistercian Monastery	Former Cistercian Monastery	Kalchrain	709.088	274.385	47.611067°N 8.889526°E
5184		Horn / Inseli	Üerschhausen	703.600	274.750	47.615238°N 8.816634°E
Unknown		ISOS Village: Nussbaumen				

== Kemmental ==
KGS No.^{?}	Picture	Name	Street Address	CH1903 X coordinate	CH1903 Y coordinate	Location
Unknown	ISOS Hamlet: Bommen	ISOS Hamlet: Bommen				

== Kesswil ==
KGS No.^{?}	Picture	Name	Street Address	CH1903 X coordinate	CH1903 Y coordinate	Location
Unknown		ISOS Village: Kesswil				

== Kreuzlingen ==
KGS No.^{?}	Picture	Name	Street Address	CH1903 X coordinate	CH1903 Y coordinate	Location
5082	Former Augustinian Chorherrenstift of St. Ulrich	Former Augustinian Chorherrenstift of St. Ulrich	Hauptstrasse 85	730.725	278.676	47.645695°N 9.178484°E
9483	Former Granary and Wine press at Seeburgscheune	Former Granary and Wine press at Seeburgscheune	Seeweg 3	731.518	279.038	47.648791°N 9.189142°E
5083	Seeburg Castle	Seeburg Castle	Seeweg 5	731.329	279.116	47.64953°N 9.18665°E
Unknown		ISOS Spezialfall: Untersee (Ermatingen, Gottlieben, Kreuzlingen, Salenstein, Tägerwilen)				

== Mammern ==
KGS No.^{?}	Picture	Name	Street Address	CH1903 X coordinate	CH1903 Y coordinate	Location
5099	Mammern Castle with Park and Chapel	Mammern Castle with Park and Chapel	Ringstrasse	711.132	278.383	47.646674°N 8.917707°E
5100		Pilgrimage Church of Mariahilf	Klingenzell	709.780	277.344	47.637559°N 8.89946°E
Unknown		ISOS Spezialfall:Mammern				
Unknown		ISOS Spezialfall: Eschenzer Becken (Eschenz, Mammern)				

== Märstetten ==
KGS No.^{?}	Picture	Name	Street Address	CH1903 X coordinate	CH1903 Y coordinate	Location
10222	Hohes Haus	Hohes Haus	Kreuzlingerstrasse 9	722.536	272.738	47.593884°N 9.067886°E
5104	Church of St. Jakob	Church of St. Jakob	Kirchgasse	722.636	272.744	47.593919°N 9.069217°E
Unknown		ISOS Village: Märstetten				
Unknown		ISOS Village: Ottoberg				
Unknown	ISOS hamlet: Boltshausen	ISOS hamlet: Boltshausen				
Unknown		ISOS Spezialfall: Ottenberg Südhang				

== Müllheim ==
KGS No.^{?}	Picture	Name	Street Address	CH1903 X coordinate	CH1903 Y coordinate	Location
Unknown		ISOS Spezialfall: Grüneck				

== Münchwilen ==
KGS No.^{?}	Picture	Name	Street Address	CH1903 X coordinate	CH1903 Y coordinate	Location
5116	St. Margarethen Chapel	St. Margarethen Chapel	Kapellstrasse	717.761	260.703	47.486539°N 9.001229°E

== Münsterlingen ==
KGS No.^{?}	Picture	Name	Street Address	CH1903 X coordinate	CH1903 Y coordinate	Location
5120	Former Benedictine Monastery	Former Benedictine Monastery	Kantonsspital	734.992	277.133	47.630957°N 9.234786°E
5119	Chapel St Leonhard	Chapel St Leonhard	Landschlacht	735.751	276.554	47.625595°N 9.244704°E
Unknown		ISOS Spezialfall: Münsterlingen				

== Neunforn ==
KGS No.^{?}	Picture	Name	Street Address	CH1903 X coordinate	CH1903 Y coordinate	Location
5132	Reformed Church	Reformed Church	Kirchgasse	699.874	273.664	47.60605°N 8.766839°E
Unknown		ISOS Village: Niederneunforn				
Unknown		ISOS Village: Oberneunforn				
Unknown		ISOS Village: Wilen bei Neunforn				
Unknown		ISOS hamlet: Farhof				

== Pfyn ==
KGS No.^{?}	Picture	Name	Street Address	CH1903 X coordinate	CH1903 Y coordinate	Location
5137		Ad Fines, Late-Roman Fortress		714.530	272.630	47.594359°N 8.961436°E
9678	Breitenloo, Prehistoric shore front settlement	Breitenloo, Prehistoric shore front settlement		712.300	272.600	47.594474°N 8.931785°E
10224	Paritätische Church of St Bartholomäus	Paritätische Church of St Bartholomäus	Im Städtli	714.513	272.625	47.594317°N 8.961209°E

== Roggwil ==
KGS No.^{?}	Picture	Name	Street Address	CH1903 X coordinate	CH1903 Y coordinate	Location
10225		Gasthof Traube	St Gallerstrasse 68	747.448	262.898	47.500289°N 9.395736°E
5142	Mammertshofen Castle	Mammertshofen Castle		747.630	262.271	47.494611°N 9.397943°E
Unknown		ISOS Village: Roggwil (TG)				
Unknown		ISOS hamlet: Watt bei Roggwil				

== Romanshorn ==
KGS No.^{?}	Picture	Name	Street Address	CH1903 X coordinate	CH1903 Y coordinate	Location
5145	Old Paritätische Church	Old Paritätische Church	Schlossbergstrasse 28	746.243	270.483	47.568756°N 9.382241°E
5146	Harbor with a wharf	Harbor with a wharf		746.250	270.250	47.566659°N 9.382257°E
10226	Catholic Church of St John the Baptist	Catholic Church of St John the Baptist	Schlossbergstrasse 22	746.128	270.480	47.568754°N 9.380712°E
Unknown		ISOS Verstädtertes Village: Romanshorn				

== Salenstein ==
KGS No.^{?}	Picture	Name	Street Address	CH1903 X coordinate	CH1903 Y coordinate	Location
8465/extendedHtmlPopup 5149, 8465	Arenenberg Castle with Chapel and Napoleon museum of Arenenberg	Arenenberg Castle with Chapel and Napoleon museum of Arenenberg		721.700	281.479	47.672635°N 9.059172°E
5150	Eugensberg Castle	Eugensberg Castle		720.532	280.825	47.666971°N 9.043445°E
5148	Louisenberg Castle	Louisenberg Castle	Mannenbach	720.904	281.371	47.671811°N 9.048546°E
10228	Pilgrimage Chapel St Aloysius	Pilgrimage Chapel St Aloysius	Mannenbach	720.910	281.354	47.671657°N 9.048621°E
Unknown		ISOS Village: Salenstein / Mannenbach				
Unknown		ISOS Spezialfall: Untersee (Ermatingen, Gottlieben, Kreuzlingen, Salenstein, Tägerwilen)				

== Schlatt ==
KGS No.^{?}	Picture	Name	Street Address	CH1903 X coordinate	CH1903 Y coordinate	Location
5188	Former Poor Clares Monastery of Paradies	Former Poor Clares Monastery of Paradies	Unterschlatt, Altparadies	692.943	282.262	47.684385°N 8.676483°E
9620		Schaarenwald (Bronze Age settlement / Roman Watchtower / Early Modern Fortification)		694.500	283.100	47.691697°N 8.697395°E
10252	Double Farm House	Double Farm House	Chrützbuckweg 2–6	693.039	282.117	47.683067°N 8.677731°E
Unknown		ISOS hamlet: Dickihof				
Unknown		ISOS Spezialfall: Monastery Paradies				

== Schönholzerswilen ==
KGS No.^{?}	Picture	Name	Street Address	CH1903 X coordinate	CH1903 Y coordinate	Location
5153		Toos-Waldi (Bronze Age hill settlement)		726.180	265.090	47.524425°N 9.114153°E
Unknown		ISOS Village: Schönholzerswilen				

== Sommeri ==
KGS No.^{?}	Picture	Name	Street Address	CH1903 X coordinate	CH1903 Y coordinate	Location
Unknown		ISOS Village: Sommeri				

== Steckborn ==
KGS No.^{?}	Picture	Name	Street Address	CH1903 X coordinate	CH1903 Y coordinate	Location
5161	Reformed Church and Church Yard	Reformed Church and Church Yard	Kirchgasse	716.033	280.710	47.666748°N 8.983528°E
5162		Schanz (Prehistoric Shore Line Settlement)		716.220	281.020	47.669503°N 8.986099°E
5171		Turgi / Feldbach (Prehistoric Shore Line Settlement)		715.650	280.500	47.664928°N 8.978376°E
5163	Turmhof	Turmhof	Seestrasse 84 a	715.977	280.953	47.668943°N 8.982847°E
Unknown		ISOS Kleinstadt / Flecken: Steckborn				
Unknown		ISOS Spezialfall: Glarisegg				

== Stettfurt ==
KGS No.^{?}	Picture	Name	Street Address	CH1903 X coordinate	CH1903 Y coordinate	Location
5174	Sonnenberg Castle	Sonnenberg Castle		714.718	265.274	47.52818°N 8.962037°E
Unknown		ISOS Village: Stettfurt				

== Tägerwilen ==
KGS No.^{?}	Picture	Name	Street Address	CH1903 X coordinate	CH1903 Y coordinate	Location
5177	Castell Castle	Castell Castle		727.319	278.594	47.645628°N 9.133143°E
Unknown		ISOS Spezialfall: Untersee (Ermatingen, Gottlieben, Kreuzlingen, Salenstein, Tägerwilen)				

== Thundorf ==
KGS No.^{?}	Picture	Name	Street Address	CH1903 X coordinate	CH1903 Y coordinate	Location
Unknown		ISOS Village: Lustdorf				

== Tobel-Tägerschen ==
KGS No.^{?}	Picture	Name	Street Address	CH1903 X coordinate	CH1903 Y coordinate	Location
Unknown		ISOS Spezialfall: Tobel				

== Uesslingen-Buch ==
KGS No.^{?}	Picture	Name	Street Address	CH1903 X coordinate	CH1903 Y coordinate	Location
4949	Catholic St Sebastians Chapel	Catholic St Sebastians Chapel	Buch Bei Frauenfeld	705.226	273.015	47.599378°N 8.837847°E
Unknown		ISOS hamlet: Iselisberg				
Unknown		ISOS hamlet: Trüttlikon				

== Wagenhausen ==
KGS No.^{?}	Picture	Name	Street Address	CH1903 X coordinate	CH1903 Y coordinate	Location
5192	Former Benedictine Priory with Mill	Former Benedictine Priory with Mill	Propstei 10, 12	705.853	279.929	47.661448°N 8.847832°E
10253	Former Propstei-Trotte	Former Propstei-Trotte	Propstei 4	705.931	279.826	47.66051°N 8.848845°E
Unknown		ISOS Village: Rheinklingen				

== Warth-Weiningen ==
KGS No.^{?}	Picture	Name	Street Address	CH1903 X coordinate	CH1903 Y coordinate	Location
Unknown		ISOS Spezialfall: Kartause Ittingen				

== Weinfelden ==
KGS No.^{?}	Picture	Name	Street Address	CH1903 X coordinate	CH1903 Y coordinate	Location
10255	Gasthaus Zum Trauben	Gasthaus Zum Trauben	Rathausstrasse 1	725.756	269.958	47.568278°N 9.1099°E
5203	Bachtobel Castle with Trotte	Bachtobel Castle with Trotte	Bachtobelstrasse 76	724.222	271.461	47.582085°N 9.08994°E
10257	Rathaus (Town council house)	Rathaus (Town council house)	Rathausstrasse 2	725.728	269.994	47.568607°N 9.109539°E
5204	Reformed Church	Reformed Church	Kirchgasse 4	725.859	269.949	47.568178°N 9.111266°E
Unknown		ISOS Kleinstadt / Flecken: Weinfelden				
Unknown		ISOS Spezialfall: Ottenberg Südhang Märstetten				

== Wigoltingen ==
KGS No.^{?}	Picture	Name	Street Address	CH1903 X coordinate	CH1903 Y coordinate	Location
4984	Altenklingen Castle	Altenklingen Castle	Altenklingen 2	723.272	273.678	47.602198°N 9.07793°E
Unknown		ISOS hamlet: Engwang				
Unknown		ISOS Spezialfall: Altenklingen				

== Wuppenau ==
KGS No.^{?}	Picture	Name	Street Address	CH1903 X coordinate	CH1903 Y coordinate	Location
Unknown		ISOS Hamlet: Heiligkreuz				

== Zihlschlacht-Sitterdorf ==
KGS No.^{?}	Picture	Name	Street Address	CH1903 X coordinate	CH1903 Y coordinate	Location
10410	Gardens of Bildegg Castle	Gardens of Bildegg Castle	Bildegg 10	739.894	263.069	47.503478°N 9.295562°E
5158	Chapel of St Nikolaus and St Magdalena	Chapel of St Nikolaus and St Magdalena	Degenau	739.907	262.730	47.500427°N 9.295628°E
Unknown		ISOS Village: Zihlschlacht				
Unknown		ISOS Spezialfall: Blidegg – Degenau				
