= Roggwil =

Roggwil is the name of two municipalities of Switzerland:

- Roggwil, Bern
- Roggwil, Thurgau
