= Arbon Castle =

Castle in Arbon, Thurgau, Switzerland

- Schloss Arbon
- Arbon
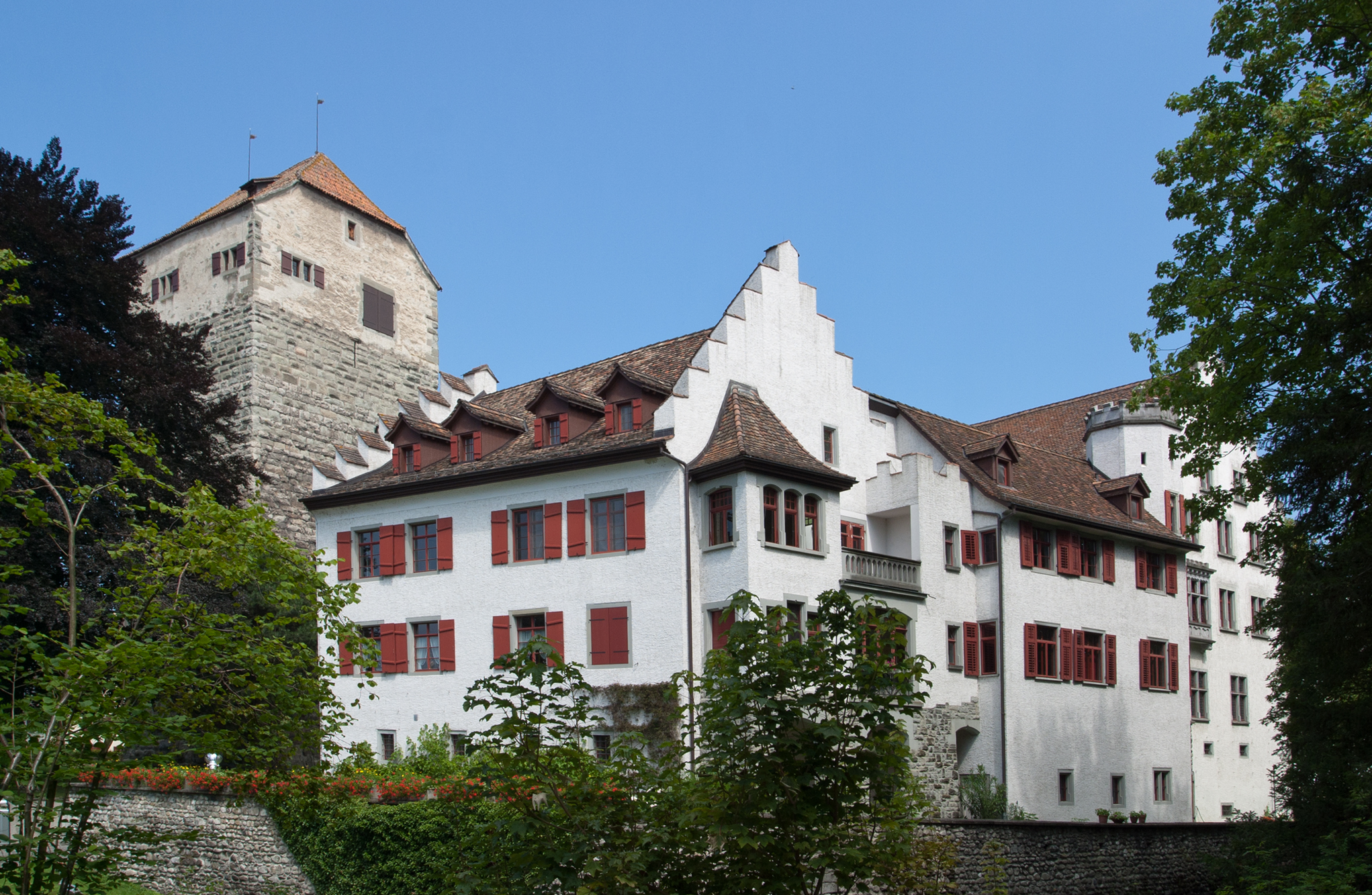
- Arbon Castle

Site information
- Owner: Arbon, Historisches Museum Arbon
- Open to the public: yes

Location
- Coordinates: 47.515662°N 9.436979°E

Site history
- Built: 13th century

Arbon Castle is a former castle and now the Historisches Museum Arbon (Arbon History Museum) located in the municipality of Arbon of the Canton of Thurgau in Switzerland. It is a Swiss heritage site of national significance.

== History ==
A castle in Arbon is first mentioned in 720 in a history of St. Gall Abbey. It stood on or near the site of the Roman era Arbor Felix fortress from 250 AD. After the Romans retreated south of the Alps around 400, the old fortress was abandoned. Sometime later a Frankish castle was built in Arbon probably for the Frankish royal family. By around 700, Arbon and presumably the castle, were the property of the diocese of Constance and an ecclesiastic overseer or bailiff ruled over Arbon.

The oldest part of the current castle is a 13th-century, originally free standing, residential tower. The tower may have been built on the foundation of an earlier building. The lower walls are up to 3.2 meters (10 ft) thick. Inside the castle there are two Romanesque fireplaces. In 1515-20 the Bishop Hugo von Hohenlandenberg rebuilt the castle to its current appearance. The old tower was rebuilt into a U shape. The upper most story, the gables and the hip roof are also from this reconstruction. The outer wall of the castle moved to stand exactly over the north-west corner of the Roman era fortress.

In 1822 the Stoffel silk ribbon weaving company moved into the castle. They remained there until 1907. In 1911 the castle was bought by Adolph Saurer, the founder of Adolph Saurer AG. He built workshops around the castle building as he experimented with motors, trucks and machinery. In 1944 his son, Hippolyt Saurer sold the castle to the city for 150,000 Swiss francs. The city renovated and expanded the castle and in 1967 opened the Historisches Museum Arbon (Arbon History Museum).

== See also ==
- List of castles in Switzerland
- List of museums in Switzerland
