= St. Margaret Chapel =

Chapel in St. Margarethen in the canton of Thurgau, Switzerland

Coordinates: 47.486549°N 9.001223°E

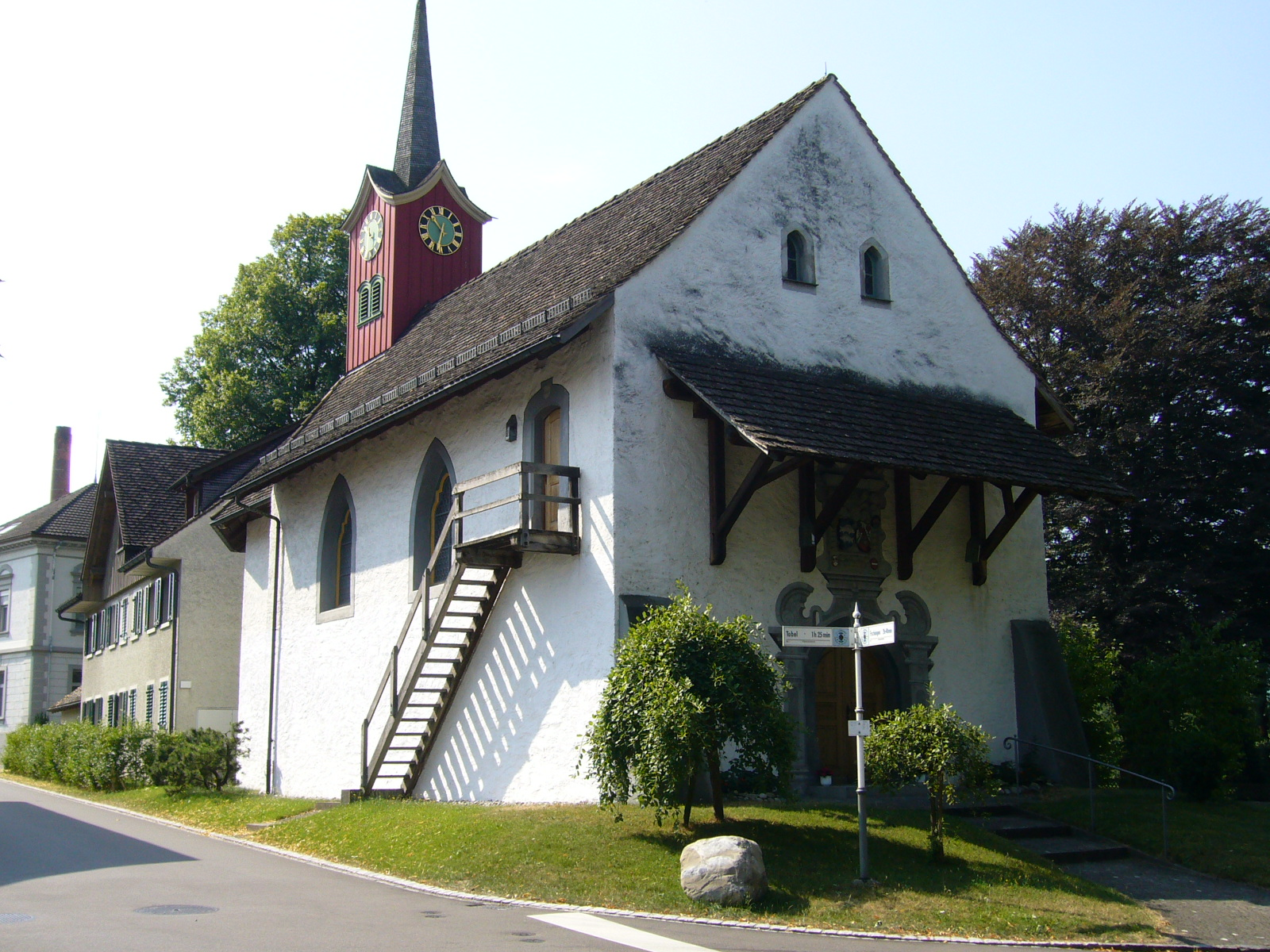
St. Margaret's Chapel in the Canton of Thurgau, Switzerland.

St. Margaret's Chapel (German: Kapelle St. Margarethen) is a pilgrimage chapel at St. Margarethen in the municipality of Münchwilen in the Canton of Thurgau in Switzerland.

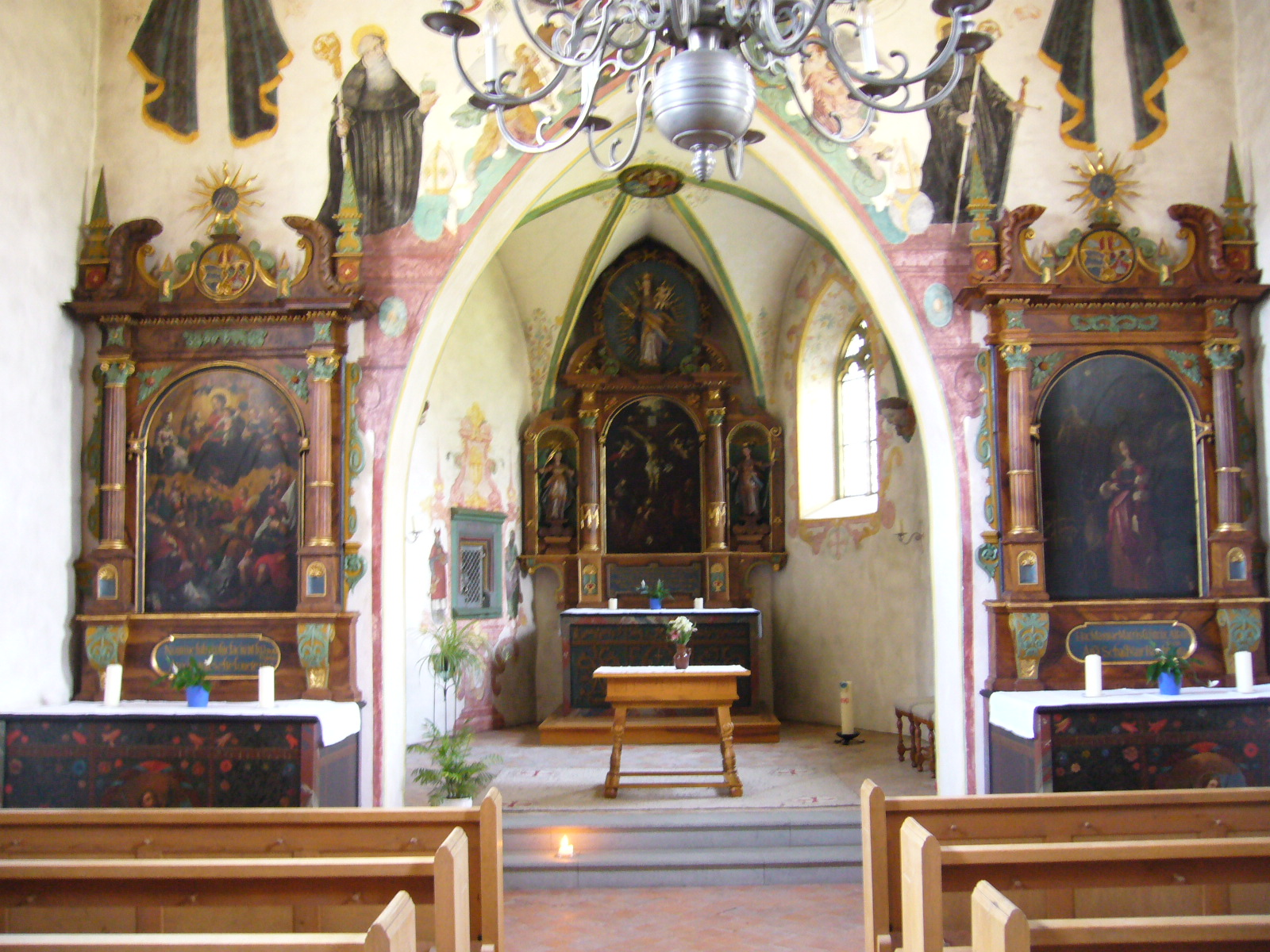
Inside the chapel
