= Mammern Castle =

Castle in Mammern, Switzerland

Coordinates: 47°38′48″N 8°55′04″E

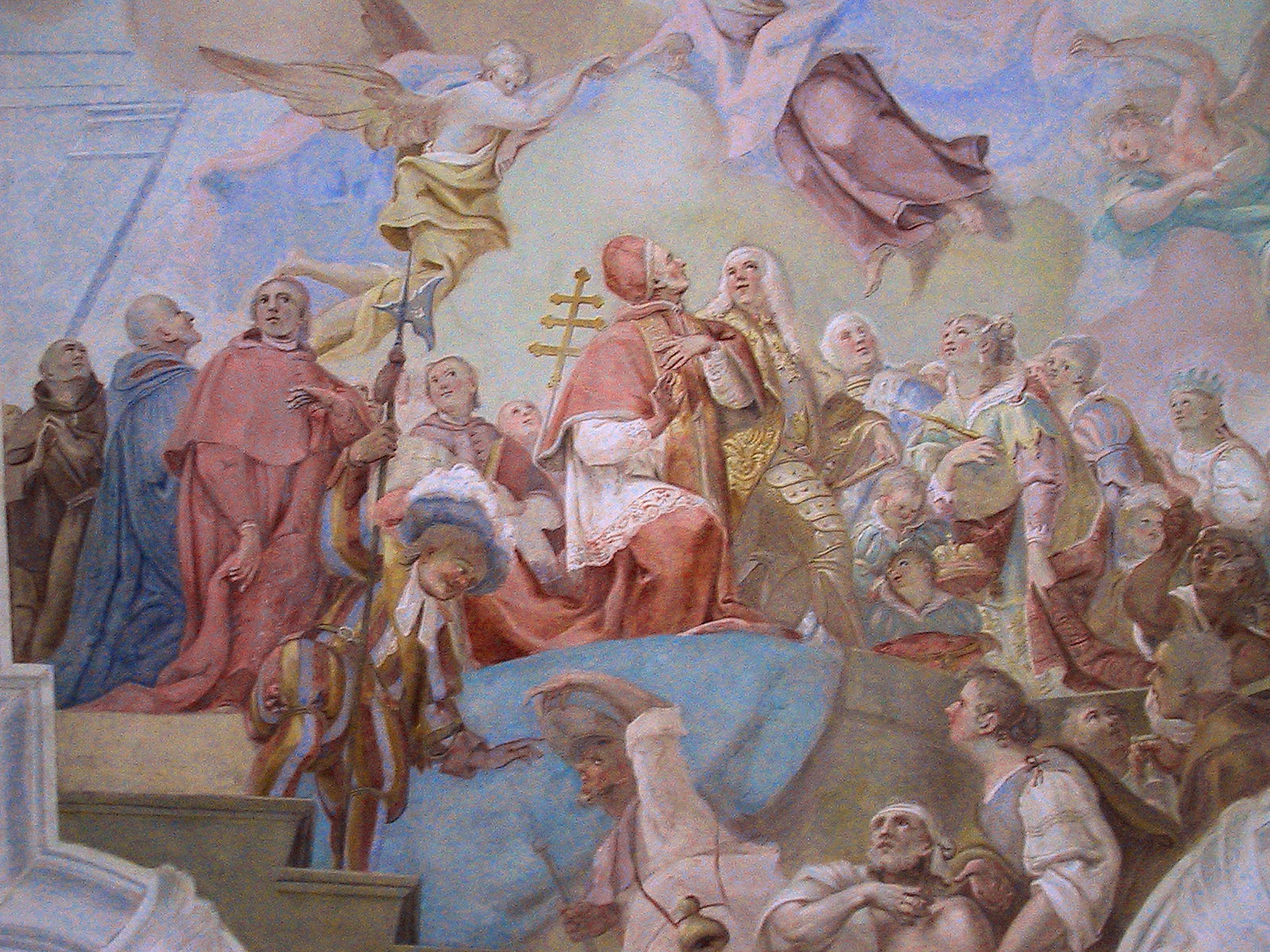
Painting in the chapel of Mammern Castle

Mammern Castle is a castle in the municipality of Mammern of the Canton of Thurgau in Switzerland. It is a Swiss heritage site of national significance.

== See also ==
- List of castles in Switzerland
