= Liebenfels Castle =

Castle in Herdern, Switzerland

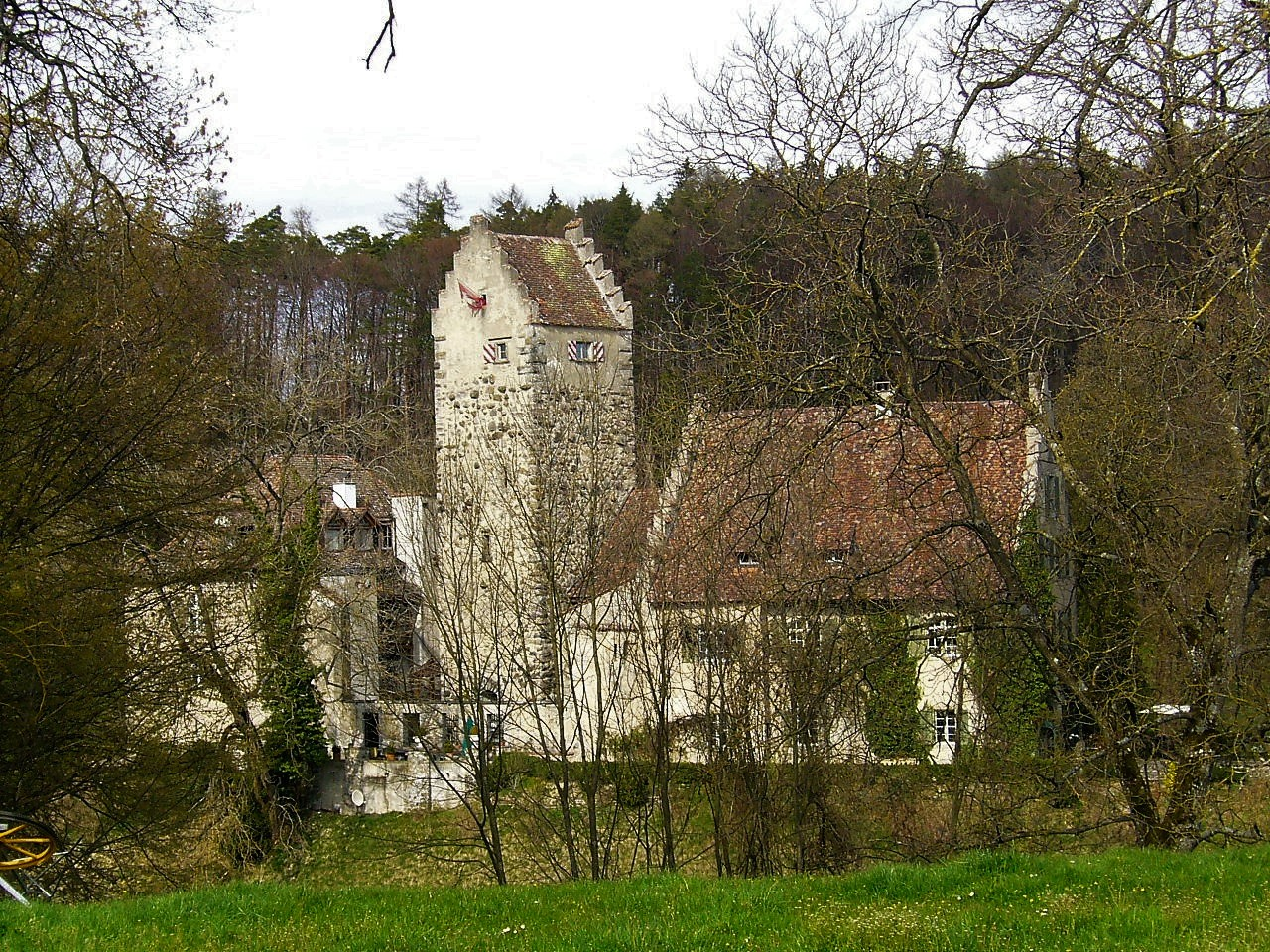
Schloss Liebenfels, Castel in the canton of Thurgau

Liebenfels Castle is a castle in the municipality of Herdern of the Canton of Thurgau in Switzerland. It is a Swiss heritage site of national significance.

== See also ==
- List of castles in Switzerland
