= Bildegg Castle =

Castle in Zihlschlacht-Sitterdorf, Switzerland

Coordinates: 47°30′13″N 9°17′44″E

Bildegg Castle is a castle in the municipality of Zihlschlacht-Sitterdorf of the Canton of Thurgau in Switzerland. It is a Swiss heritage site of national significance.

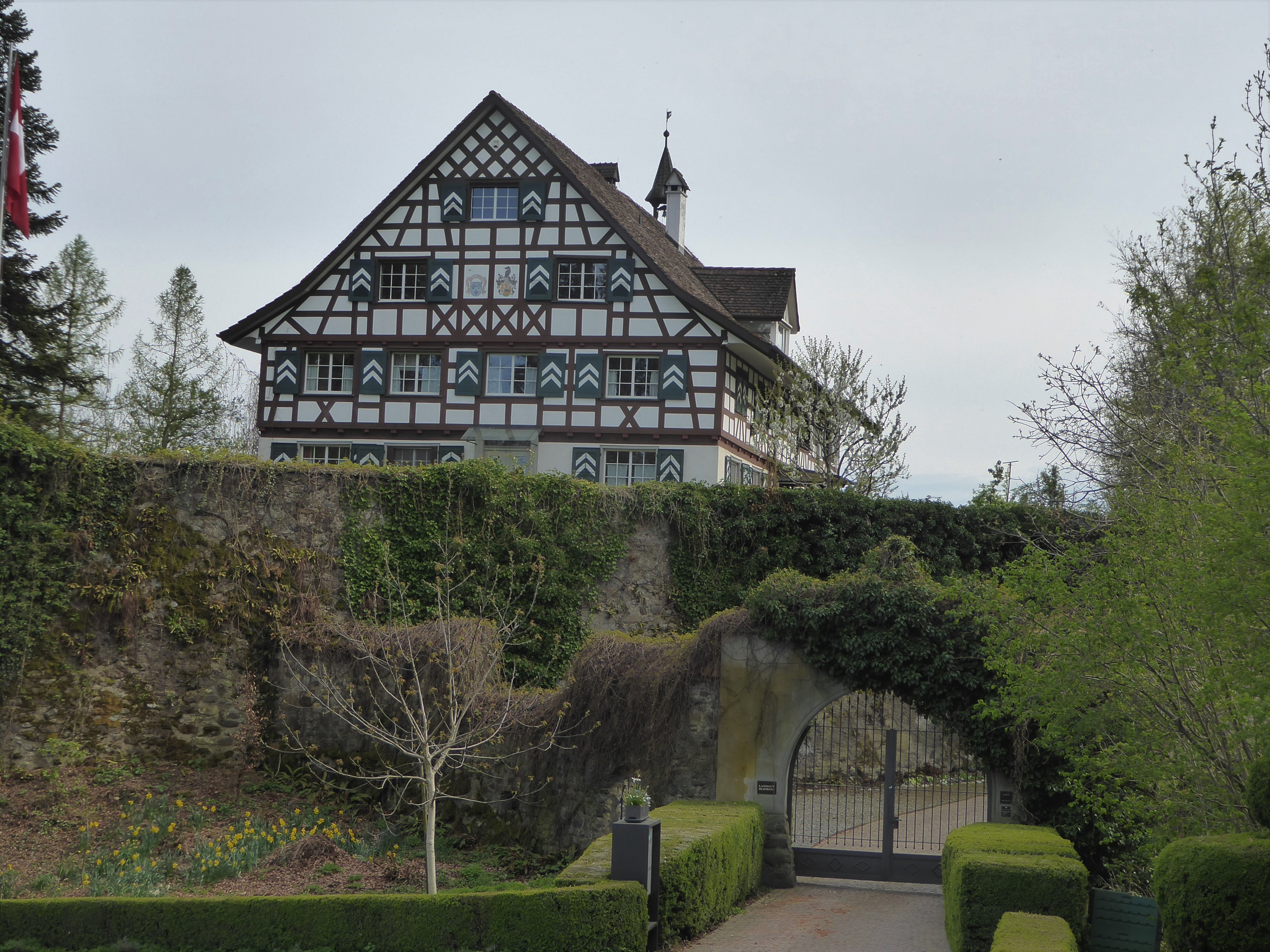
Bildegg Castle

== See also ==
- List of castles in Switzerland
