= Bachtobel Castle =

Castle in Weinfelden, Switzerland

Coordinates: 47°34′56″N 9°05′24″E

Bachtobel Castle is a castle in the municipality of Weinfelden of the Canton of Thurgau in Switzerland. It is a Swiss heritage site of national significance.

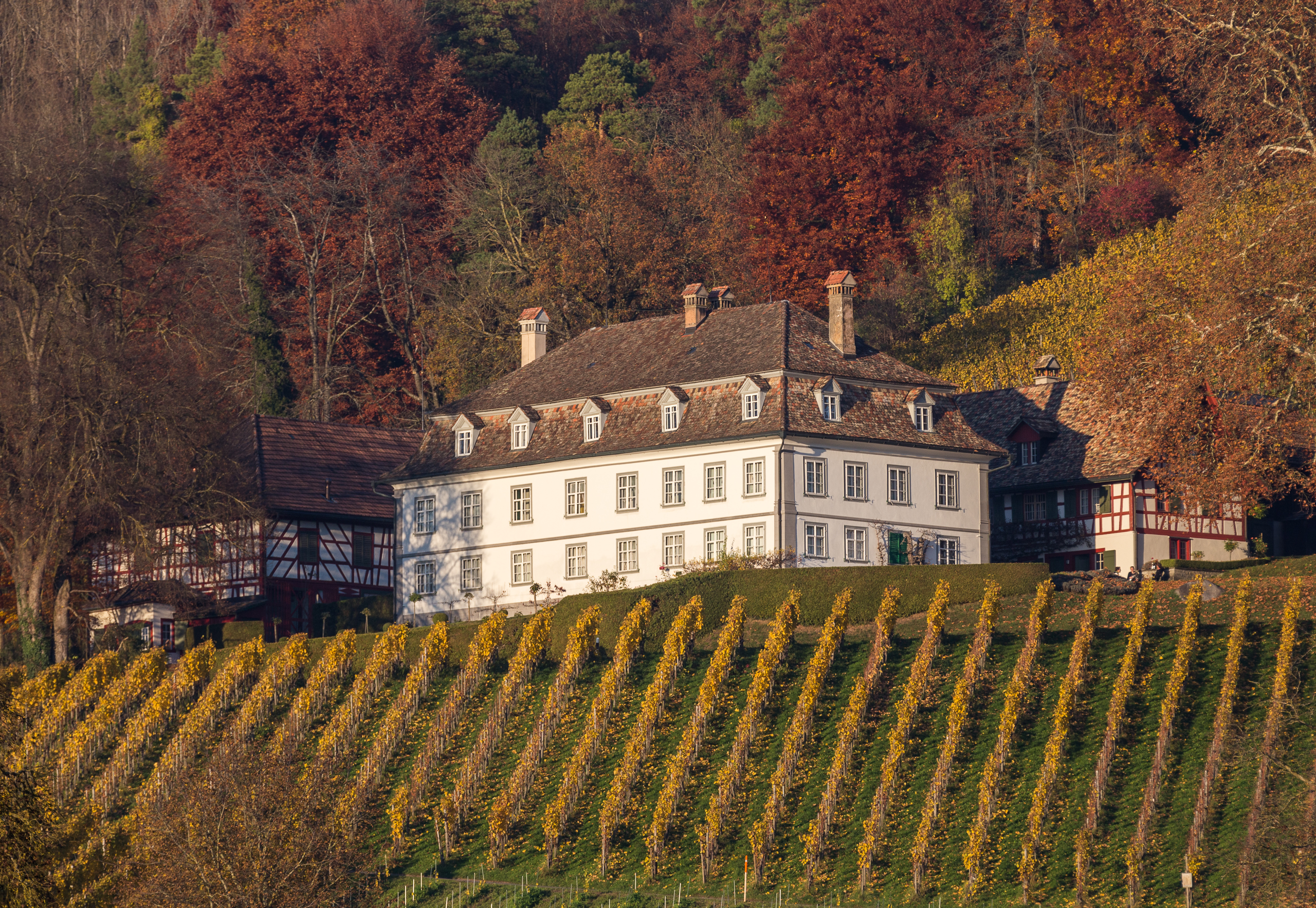
Bachtobel Castle

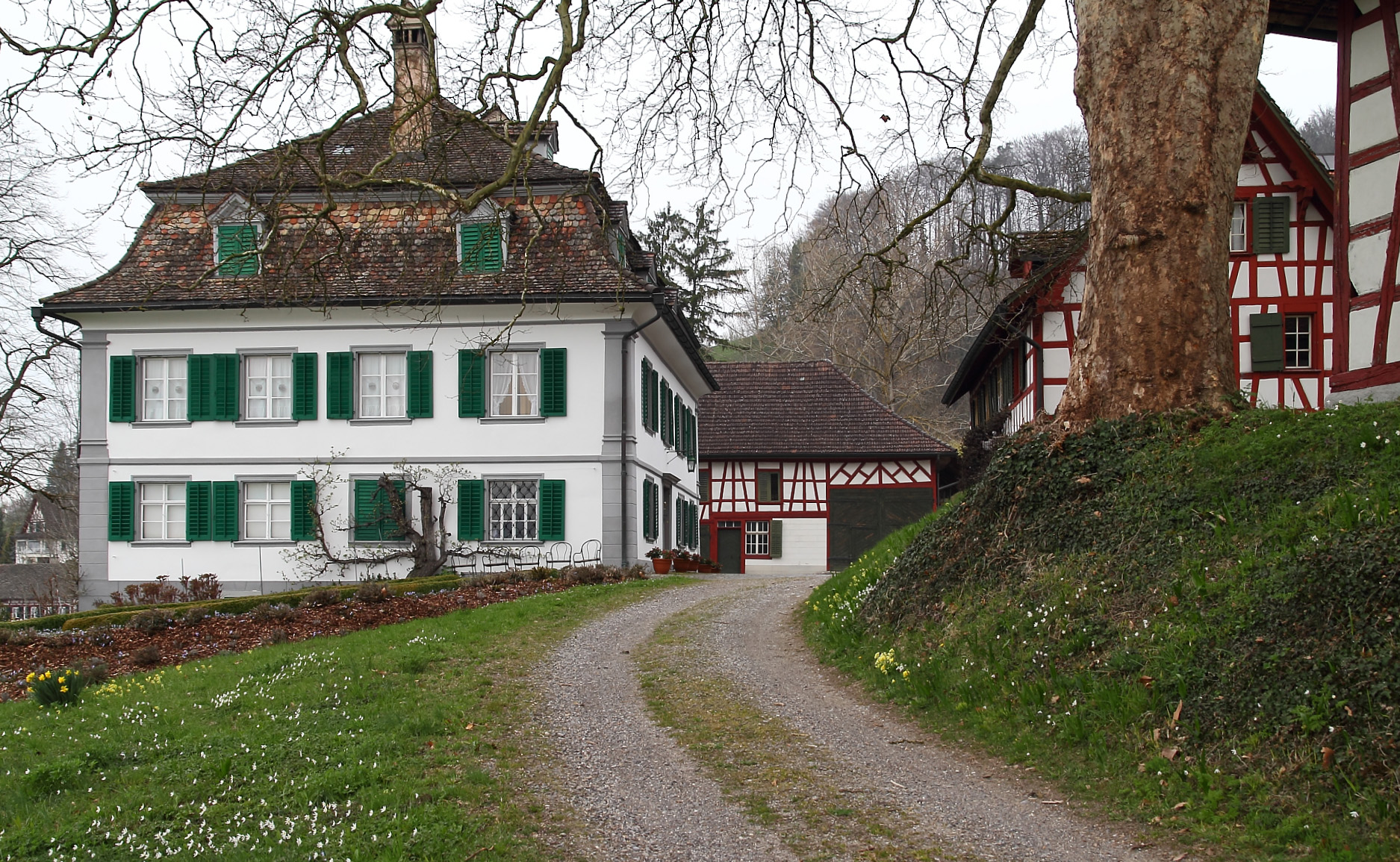
Bachtobel Castle, view from the east

== See also ==
- List of castles in Switzerland
