= Bettwiesen Castle =

Castle in Bettwiesen, Switzerland

Coordinates: 47°29′46″N 9°01′47″E

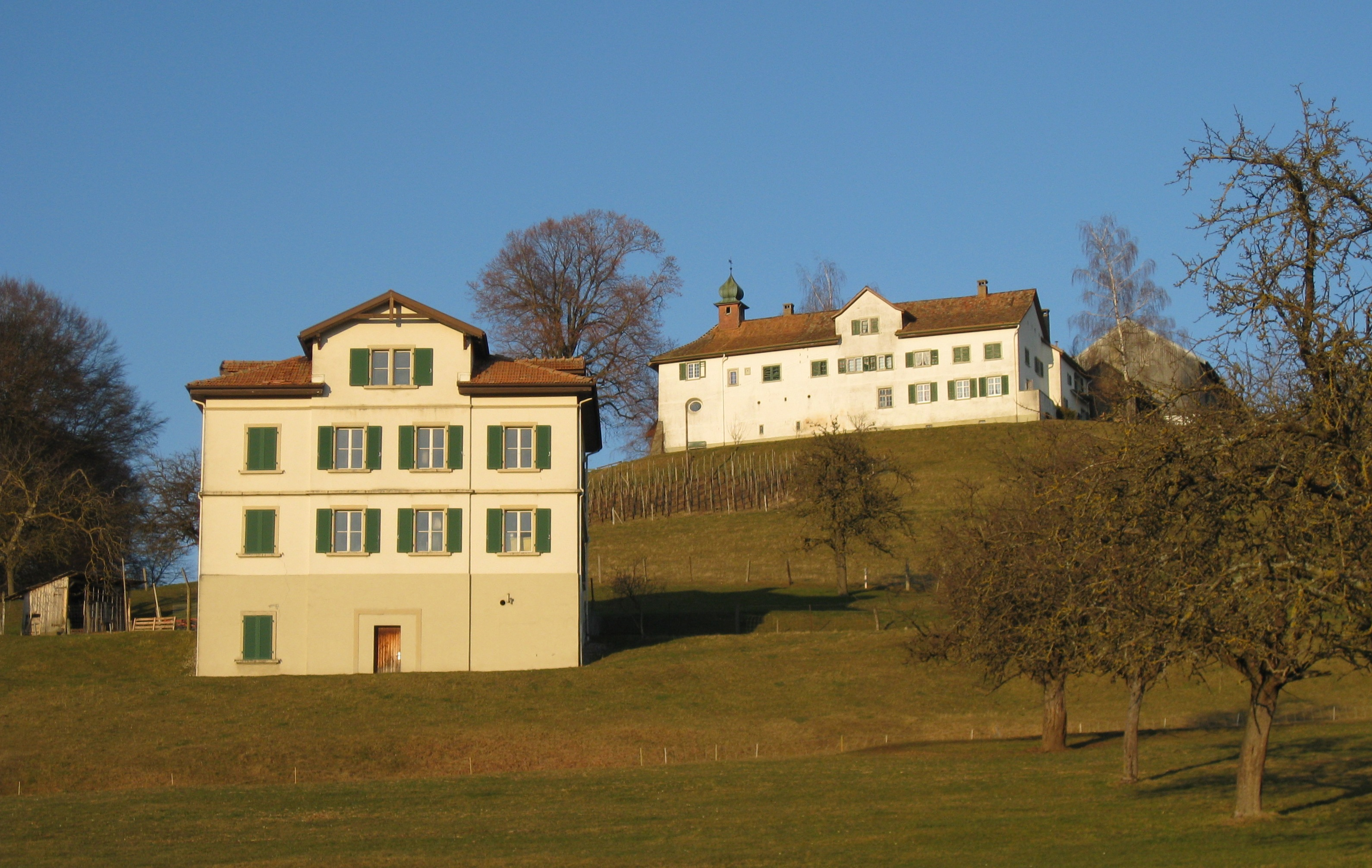
Bettwiesen Castle

Bettwiesen Castle is a castle in the municipality of Bettwiesen of the Canton of Thurgau in Switzerland. It is a Swiss heritage site of national significance.

== See also ==
- List of castles in Switzerland
