= Hagenwil Castle =

Castle in Amriswil, Thurgau, Switzerland

- Schloss Hagenwil
- Hagenwil, Amriswil
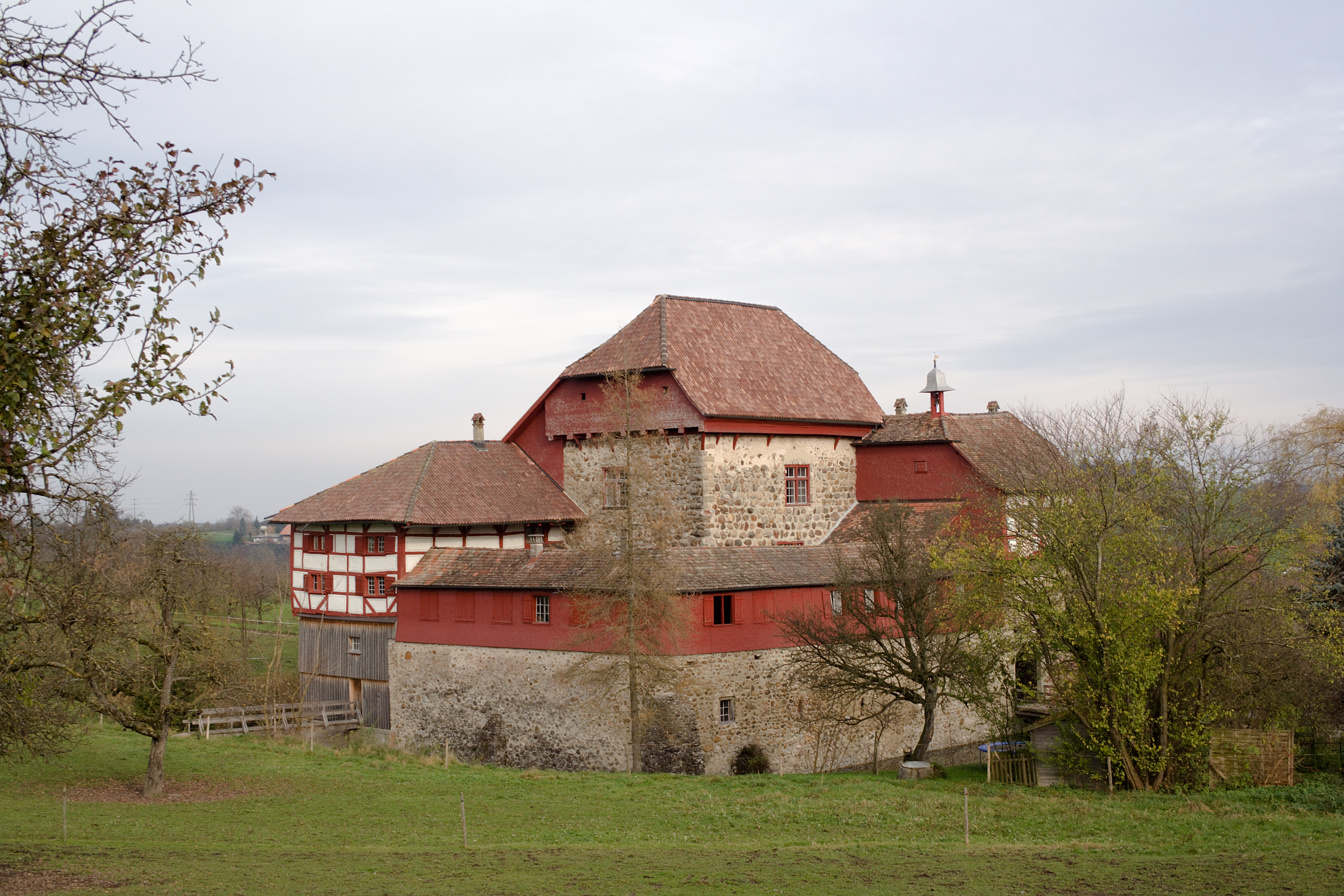
- Hagenwil Castle

Site information
- Type: water castle
- Code: CH-TG

Location
- Location within Switzerland
- Coordinates: 47°31′45″N 9°18′19″E

Site history
- Built: 1264

Garrison information
- Occupants: Rudolf von Hagenwil

Hagenwil Castle is a castle in the municipality of Amriswil of the Canton of Thurgau in Switzerland. It is a Swiss heritage site of national significance. It is the only remaining intact water castle in eastern Switzerland.

== History ==
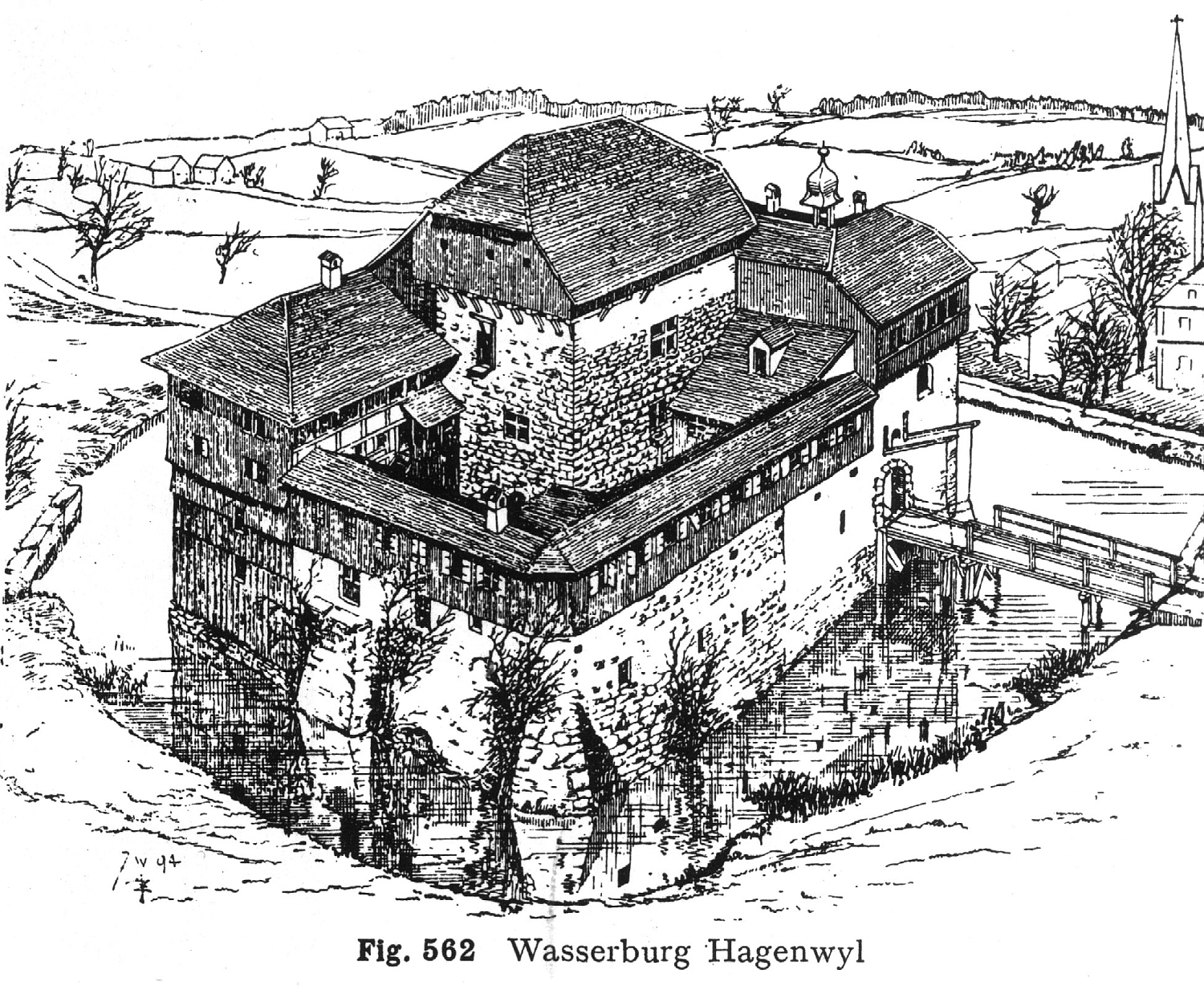
Hagenwil Castle in 1912

The first mention of the castle is in 1264 when Rudolf von Hagenwil donated it to the Abbey of St. Gall. The donation was made in gratitude to the Abbot of St. Gall for rescuing Rudolf from his sons in law, who were holding him prisoner at Heitnau Castle in an attempt to receive their inheritance early. The donation included the right for Rudolf and his family to continue occupying the castle. After his son Ulrich died childless, the title to the castle transferred fully to the Abbey. The next time the castle is mentioned, in 1341, it was the fief of Hermann von Breitenlandenberg.

During the Appenzell Wars, in 1405, an Appenzell army marched through the Hagenwil area. While there is no record of an attack, the stone walls show evidence of a massive fire and many wooden beams date to between 1414 and 1425, indicating that the castle was probably damaged. In 1407 the castle and village were inherited by Konrad and Ulrich Paygrer. Konrad Paygrer died in 1446, and his widow quickly remarried. Her new husband, Burkhard Schenk von Castell, bought out the shares of the remaining heirs. However, in 1470, Jakob Paygrer bought Hagenwil back from his stepfather. When he died in 1504, his sons in law, Jakob von Reinach and Wilhelm von Bernhausen inherited the estates. The castle remained with the Bernhausen family for about 180 years.

During the Protestant Reformation the village of Hagenwil converted to the new faith in 1529. However, in 1536 they converted back to the Roman Catholic Church.

During the Thirty Years War, on 6 September 1633, the castle was attacked and captured by a Swedish army, though it only suffered minor damage. The last Bernhausen owner of the castle was a Lieutenant in the Swiss Guards in France. He had little interest in ever living in the castle and so sold it in 1683 to the Abbot of St. Gall for 25,000 Gulden. For over a century, the castle remained a possession of the Abbey and was occupied by a succession of overseers. The castle was often used as a summer palace for the Abbot. In 1786/87 a large residence was added on the eastern side of the castle. This building included a great hall and comfortable rooms for the Abbot.

After the 1798 French invasion of Switzerland and the creation of the Helvetic Republic the Abbey's estates, including Hagenwil, were nationalized. With the collapse of the Republic and the 1803 Act of Mediation, the Canton of St. Gallen was created, incorporating many of the Abbey's former estates. Two years later, in 1805, the Grand Council of the Canton decided to sell off much of the former estates including Hagenwil. Benedikt Angehrn bought the castle and in 1830 added a restaurant in the courtyard. In 1937/38 the castle was repaired and restored with the help of the Swiss Federal Office of Civil Protection. In 1985 an archeological exploration of the castle was undertaken. The old kitchen was replaced with a new, three story building in 2003/4. The castle and restaurant are still owned by the Angehrn family.

== Castle site ==
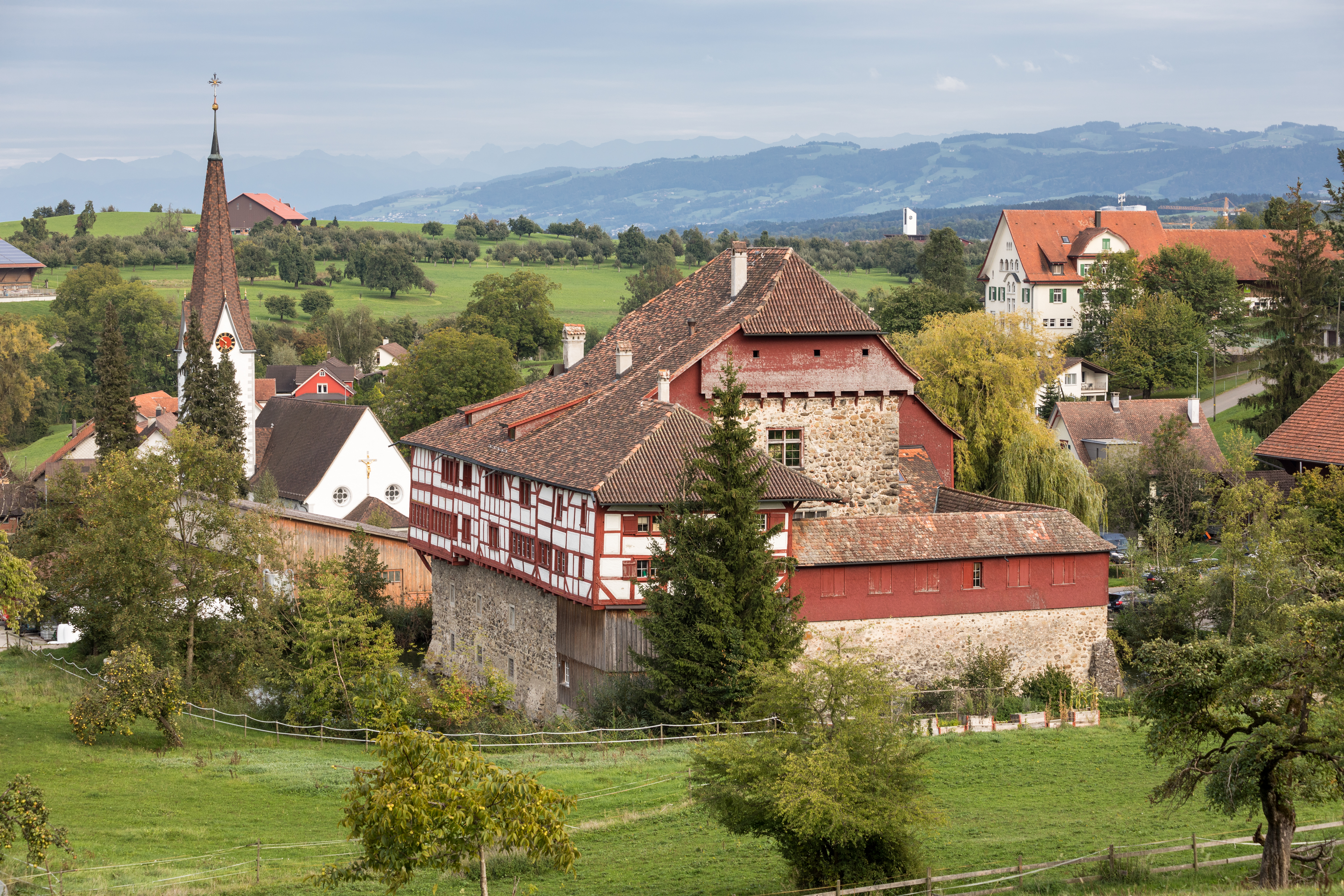
Castle, church, village

The castle complex is a rough square surrounded by an 18th century 3.2 meters (10 ft) deep water filled moat. In the center of the complex is the 13th century main tower. The main tower is 13.2 by 10 meters (43 ft × 33 ft), with unfinished, round stone walls that are up to 1.7 m (5.6 ft) thick. The original high entrance was on the northern side of the east wall, but was filled in when the west and east ground level entrances were opened, probably in 1551.

The ring wall was added in either the 13th or 14th centuries. Much of the southern wall and gate are from the original ring wall. During the 15th century a palas was built along the north wall, incorporating the old tower. The old north-west corner of the ring wall was demolished and a two story half-timbered residence was added. A gatehouse was first built near the south-east corner in 1485/86, though it was later replaced. The eastern buildings, the entrance hall and a chapel were added in 1786/87. The old gatehouse was replaced with another that has the date 1741 carved above the entrance.

Today the castle is open for tours by appointment. In addition the restaurant is open most days and many of the rooms are available for meetings and events.

== See also ==
- List of castles in Switzerland
