= Tannegg Castle =

Castle in Fischingen, Switzerland

Coordinates: 47°25′50″N 8°57′02″E

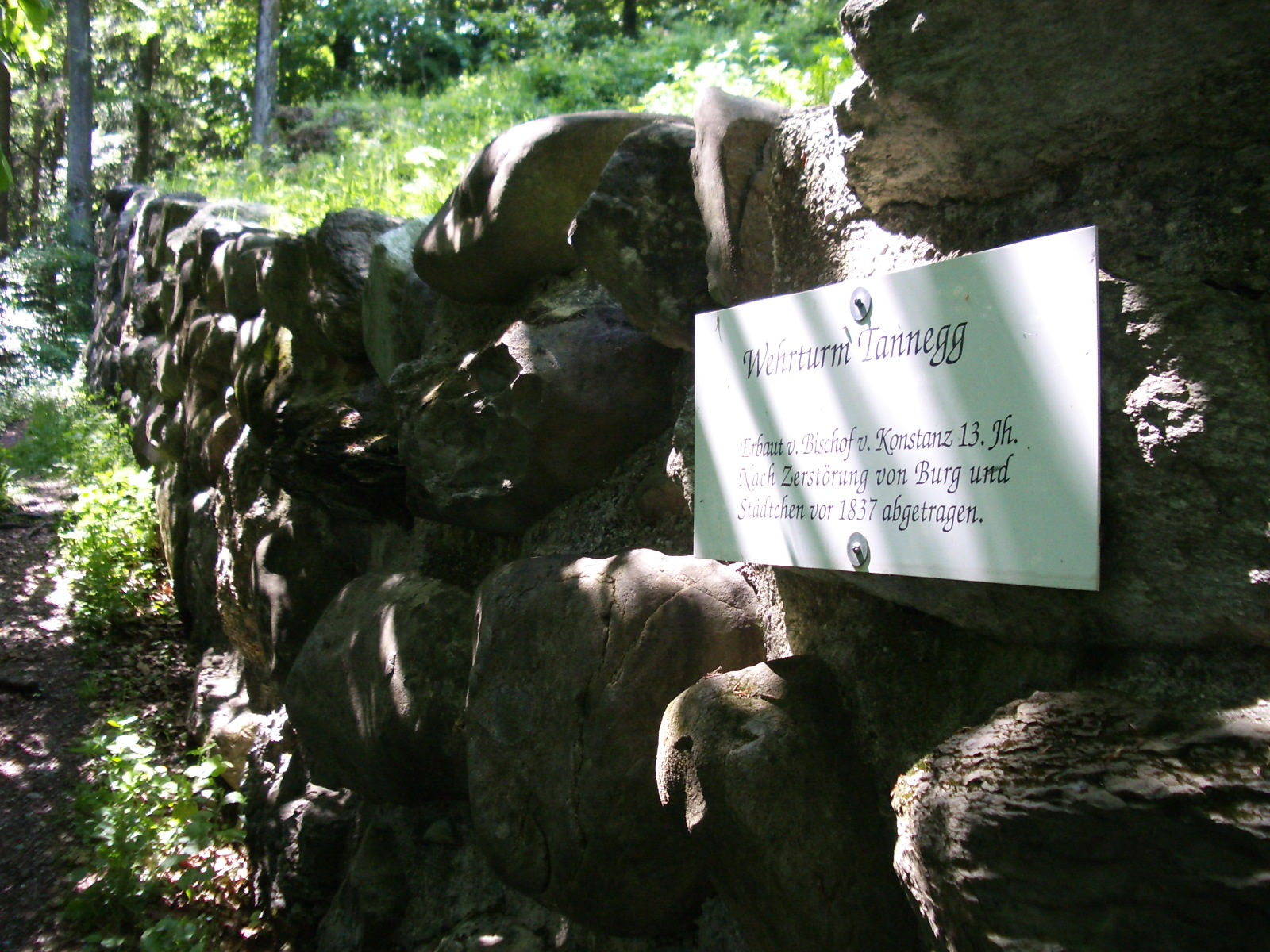
Tannegg Castle

Tannegg Castle is a castle in the municipality of Fischingen of the Canton of Thurgau in Switzerland. It is a Swiss heritage site of national significance.

== See also ==
- List of castles in Switzerland
