= Hauptwil Castle =

Castle and Heritage site in Thurgau, Switzerland

Coordinates: 47°28′50″N 9°15′06″E

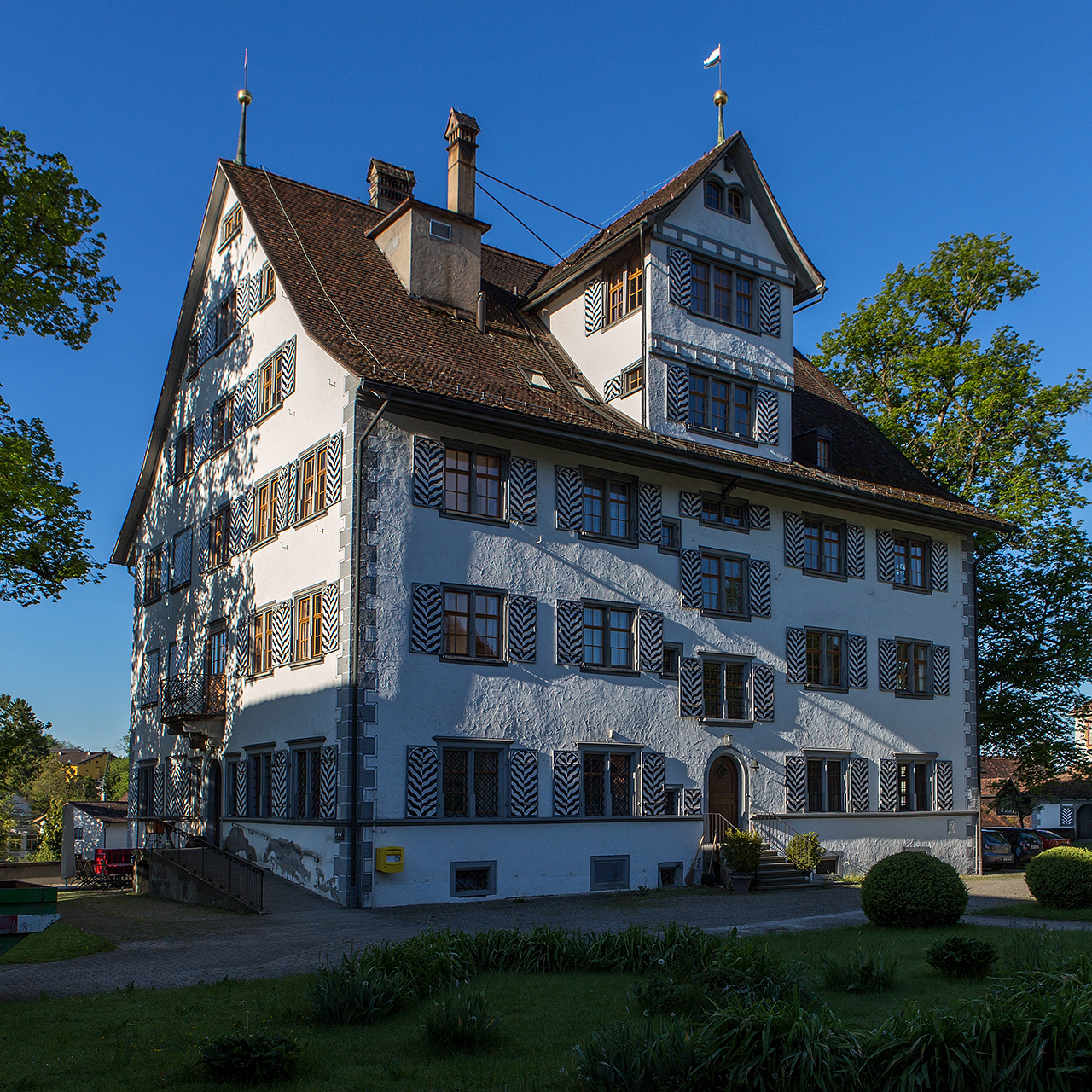
Hauptwil Castle in 2017

Hauptwil Castle is a castle in the municipality of Hauptwil-Gottshaus of the Canton of Thurgau in Switzerland. It is a Swiss heritage site of national significance.

== See also ==
- List of castles in Switzerland
