= Gottlieben Castle =

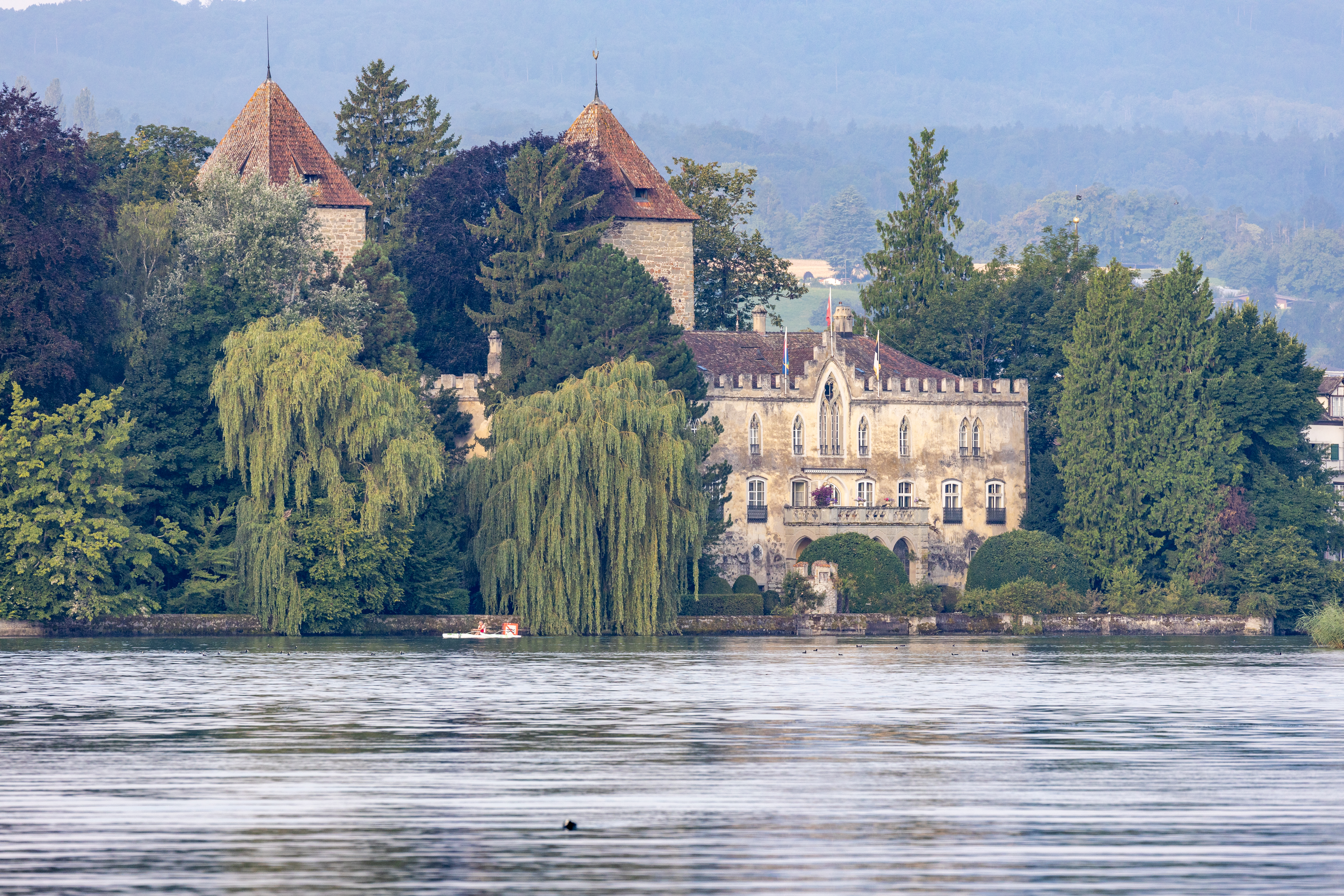
- Gottlieben Castle

- Location within Switzerland

General information
- Classification: Cultural Property of National Significance
- Location: Gottlieben, Switzerland
- Coordinates: 47.664027°N 9.136021°E
- Construction started: 1251

Gottlieben Castle (German: Schloss Gottlieben) is a castle in the municipality of Gottlieben in the canton of Thurgau in Switzerland. It is a Swiss heritage site of national significance.

== History ==
Gottlieben village is first mentioned around the end of the 10th century as Gotiliubon. It was originally part of the land owned by the Bishop of Constance. In 1251, Eberhard von Waldburg built a castle that served as the residence of the Bishops. After the Swabian War in 1499 the episcopal chief constable managed the village and the local low court from the castle until 1798. The court included Engwilen, Siegershausen and Tägerwilen as well as Gottlieben and made up the Bishop's bailiwick of Gottlieben. In 1808 the castle became private property. In 1837 it was renovated in a neo-gothic style.

== Historic views of the castle ==
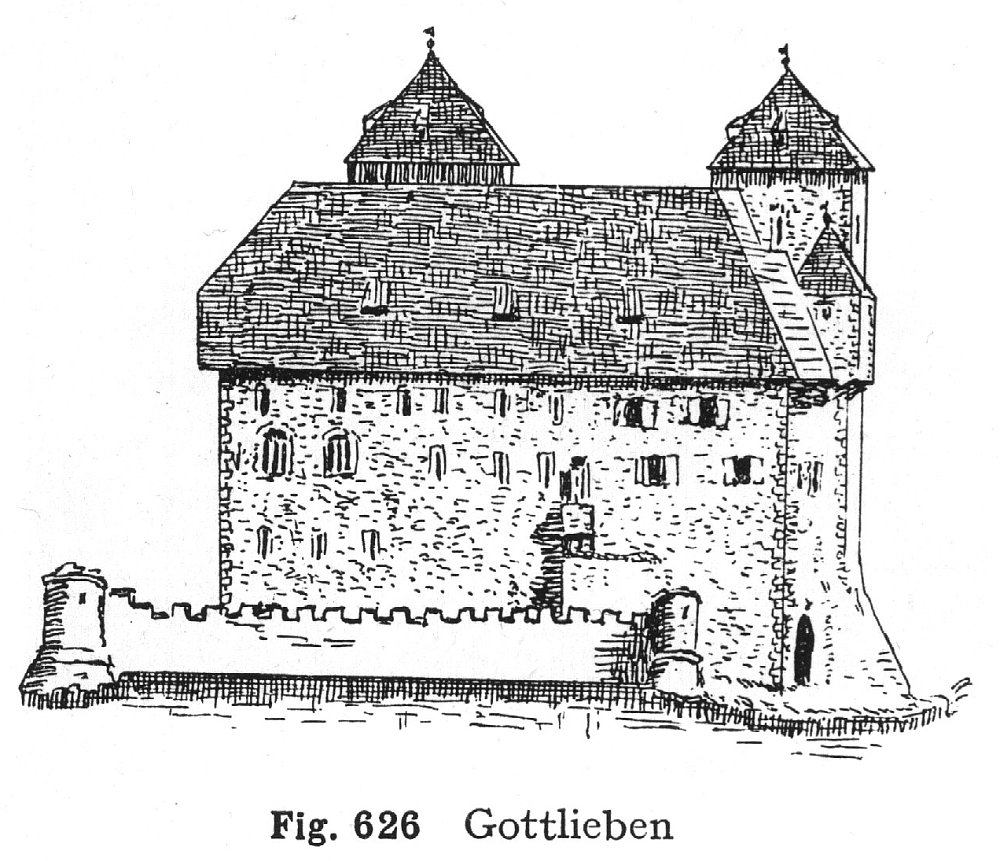
Gottlieben reconstruction of the earlier castle

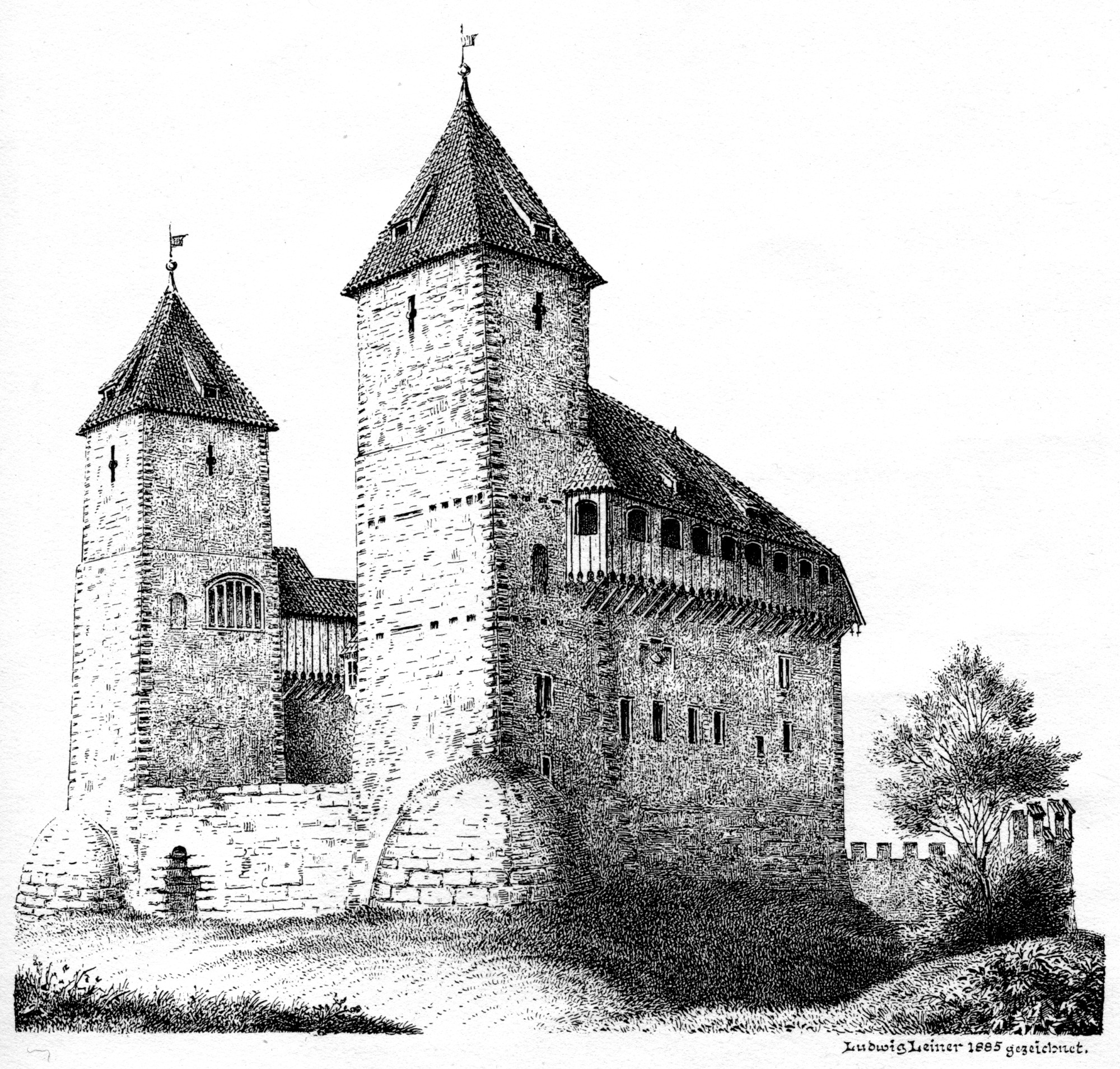
Gottlieben Castle in the 19th century

== See also ==
- List of castles and fortresses in Switzerland
