= Frauenfeld Castle =

Castle in Switzerland

Coordinates: 47°33′19″N 8°53′49″E

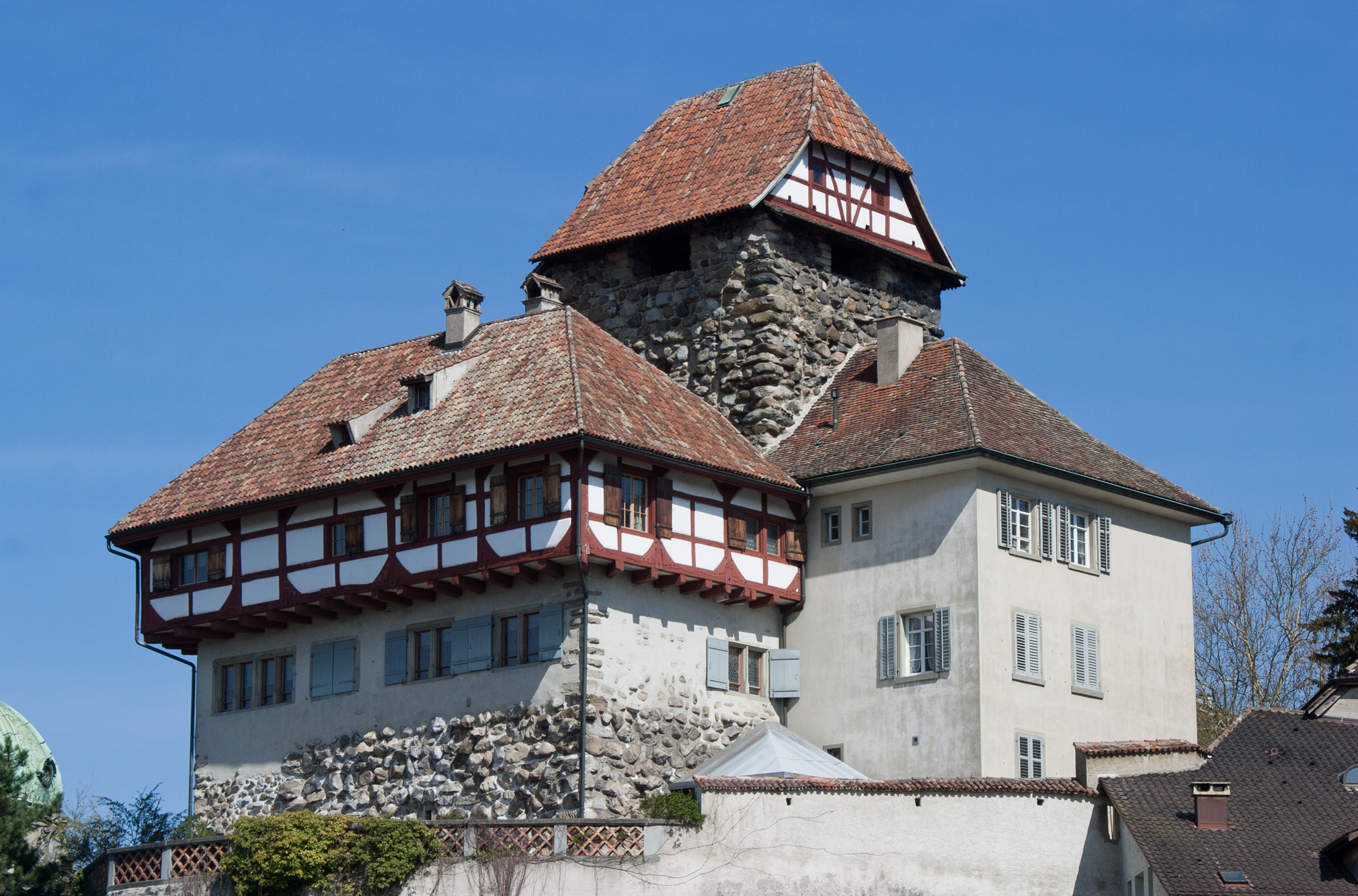
Frauenfeld Castle

Frauenfeld Castle is a castle in the municipality of Frauenfeld of the Canton of Thurgau in Switzerland. It is a Swiss heritage site of national significance.

== See also ==
- List of castles in Switzerland
