= Mammertshofen Castle =

Castle in Roggwil, Switzerland

Coordinates: 47°29′41″N 9°23′53″E

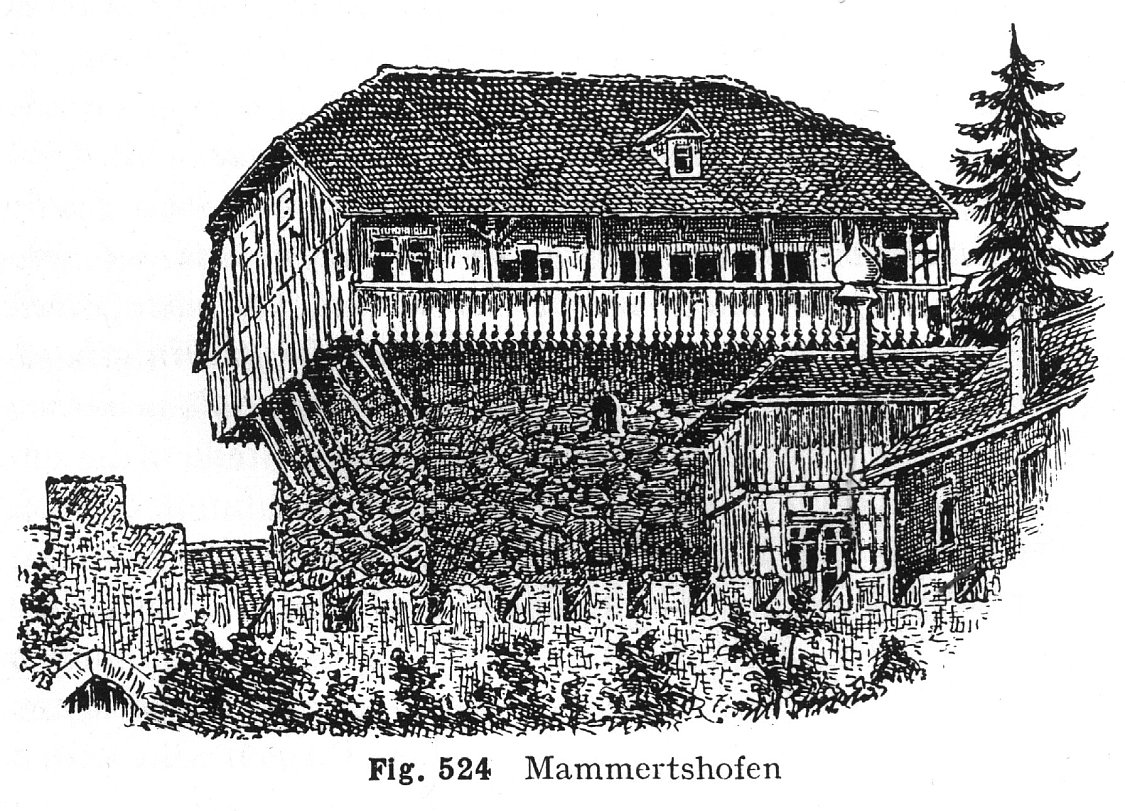
Mammertshofen Castle

Mammertshofen Castle is a castle in the municipality of Roggwil of the Canton of Thurgau in Switzerland. It is a Swiss heritage site of national significance.

== See also ==
- List of castles in Switzerland
