= Seeburg Castle =

Castle in Kreuzlingen, Switzerland

Coordinates: 47°38′58″N 9°11′12″E

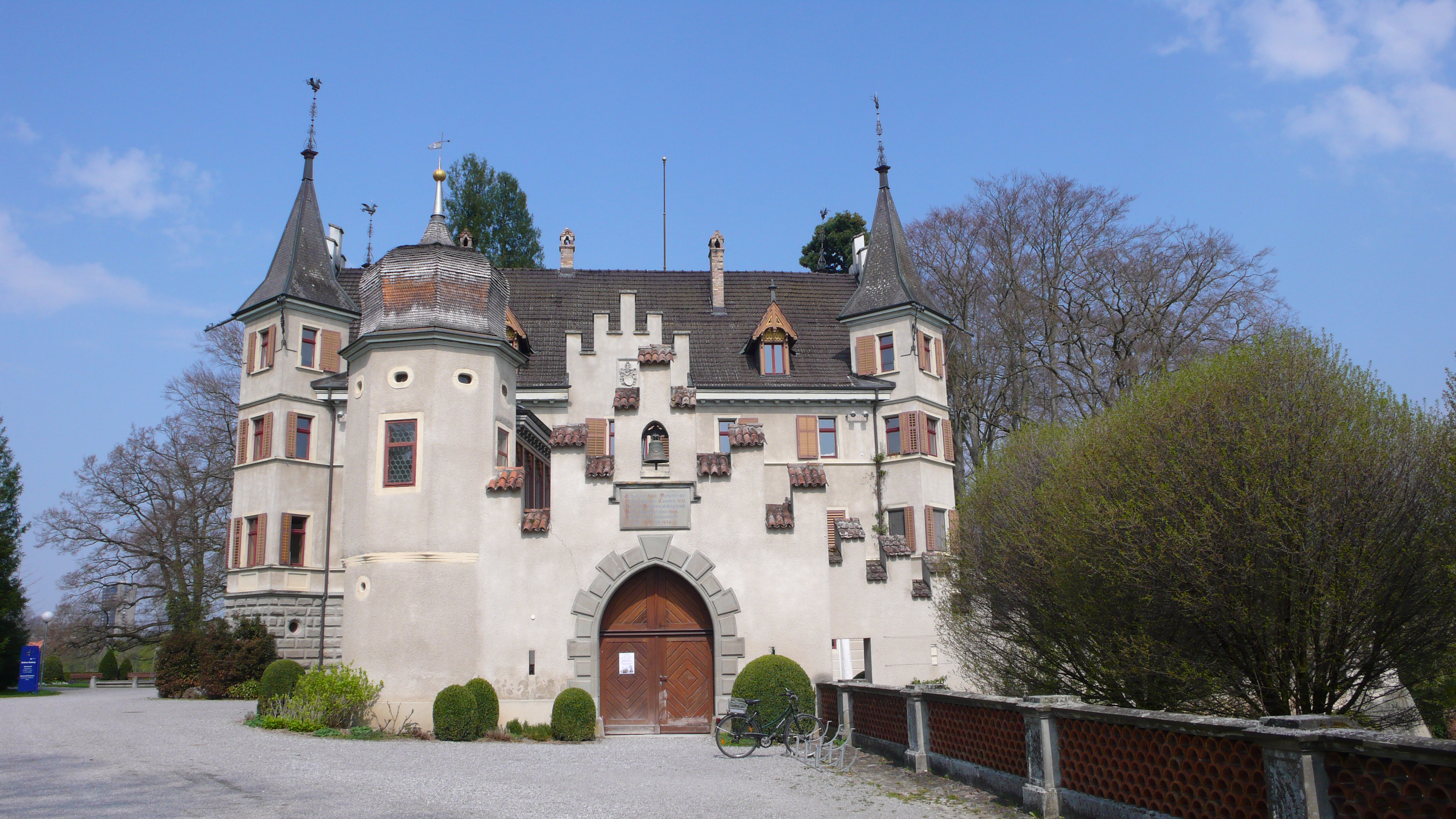
Seeburg Castle

Seeburg Castle is a castle in the municipality of Kreuzlingen of the Canton of Thurgau in Switzerland. It is a Swiss heritage site of national significance.

There is more information about it at a site (implausibly entitled) Ancient History Sites. The Schloss is currently used as a meeting space and restaurant according to its website.

== See also ==
- List of castles in Switzerland
