= Louisenberg Castle =

Castle in Salenstein, Switzerland

Coordinates: 47°40′19″N 9°02′55″E

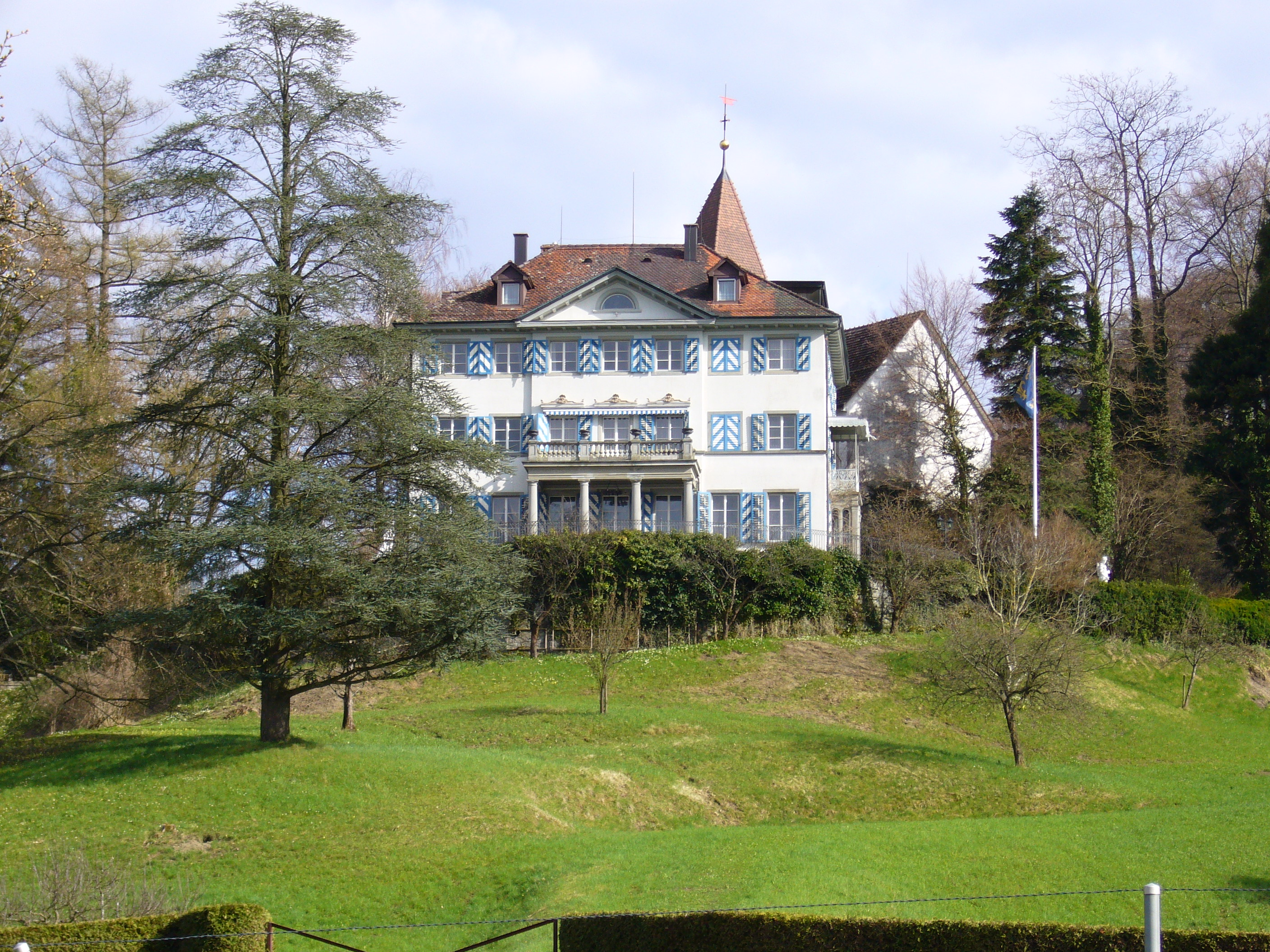
Louisenberg Castle

Louisenberg Castle is a castle in the municipality of Salenstein of the Canton of Thurgau in Switzerland. It is a Swiss heritage site of national significance.

== See also ==
- List of castles in Switzerland
