= Herdern =

- Municipality
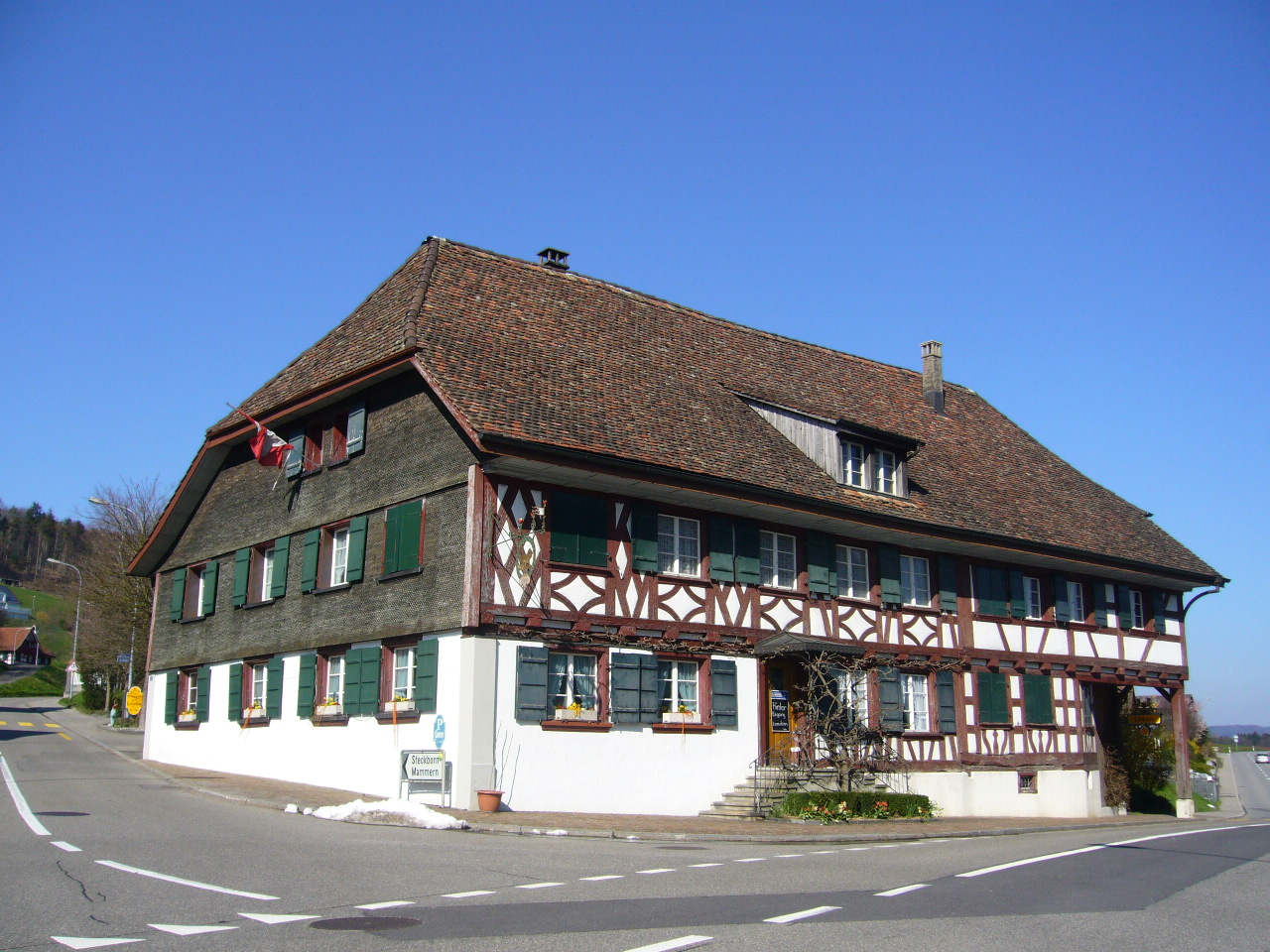
- The inn "Löwen", in Herdern

- Coat of arms
- Location of Herdern
- Location within Switzerland Location within Canton of Thurgau
- Coordinates: 47°36′N 8°54′E
- Country: Switzerland
- Canton: Thurgau
- District: Frauenfeld

Area
  - Total: 13.67 km^{2} (5.28 sq mi)
- Elevation: 412 m (1,352 ft)

Population (December 2007)
  - Total: 922
  - Density: 67.4/km^{2} (175/sq mi)
- Time zone: UTC+01:00 (CET)
  - Summer (DST): UTC+02:00 (CEST)
- Postal code: 8535
- SFOS number: 4811
- ISO 3166 code: CH-TG
- Surrounded by: Homburg, Hüttwilen, Mammern, Pfyn, Warth-Weiningen
- Website: herdern.ch

Herdern is a municipality in Frauenfeld District in the canton of Thurgau in Switzerland.

== History ==
Herdern is first mentioned in 1094 as Harderin. Originally it was under the authority of Ittingen. Until 1403 the local castle, Herden Castle, was home to the Bettler family. In 1501, the low court of Herdern was combined with the lands of Herden Castle to form the Herrschaft of Herdern. In 1601 the castle was expanded and renovated. In 1683 the castle and Herrschaft came to the monastery of St. Urban in Lucerne. The low court was managed until 1798 by the monastery's resident governor who occupied the castle. The castle belonged to the monastery of St. Urban until 1848 when it was sold. After passing through several owners it was acquired by the Verein Arbeiterkolonien Herden (Association of the Work Camps of Herdern). They opened the castle in 1895 as a home for unemployed workers, ex-prisoners and vagrants. In 1995 the castle became a home for those with psychological and social problems (it had 75 inhabitants in 2003).

The parish boundaries were very similar to the Herrschaft lands. In 1331 the church rights and taxes went to the monastery at Kalchrain. When the Protestant Reformation entered the village in 1529, the local nobility remained by the old religion, and in 1533 Kalchrain sent a priest to support the nobility. The parish remained Catholic.

Until the 19th century the major sources of income in Herdern were grain, wine and fruit production. These remained important even after a cloth factory and a lignite mine opened. Towards the end of the 19th century, livestock production and dairy farming began to move into the village.

== Geography ==
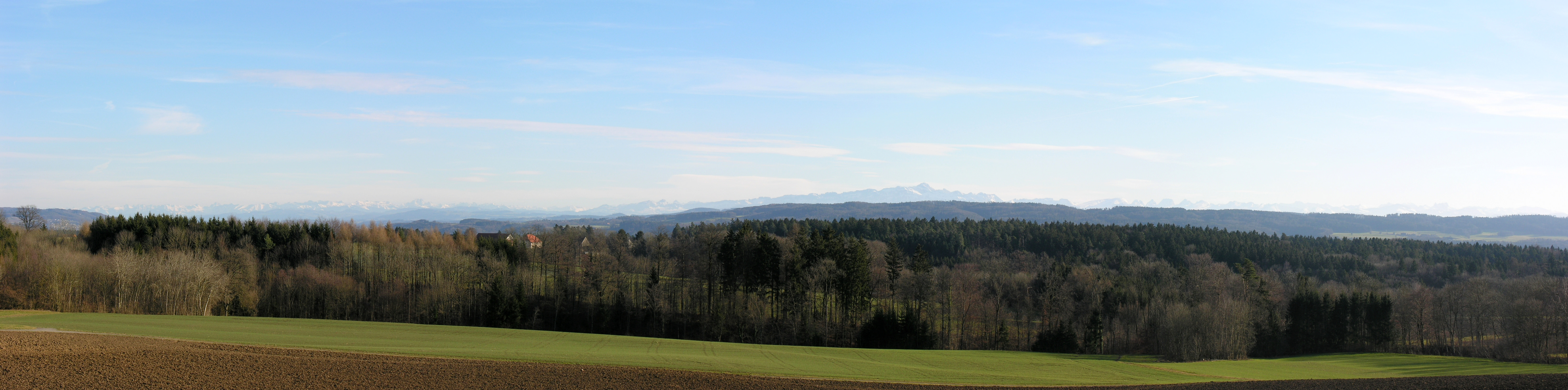
The Alps as seen from Herdern

Herdern has an area, as of 2009, of 13.67 square kilometers (5.28 sq mi). Of this area, 9.21 km^{2} (3.56 sq mi) or 67.4% is used for agricultural purposes, while 3.84 km^{2} (1.48 sq mi) or 28.1% is forested. Of the rest of the land, 0.61 km^{2} (0.24 sq mi) or 4.5% is settled (buildings or roads) and 0.02 km^{2} (4.9 acres) or 0.1% is unproductive land.

Of the built up area, industrial buildings made up 2.1% of the total area while housing and buildings made up 0.1% and transportation infrastructure made up 0.1%. while parks, green belts and sports fields made up 2.2%. Out of the forested land, 26.6% of the total land area is heavily forested and 1.5% is covered with orchards or small clusters of trees. Of the agricultural land, 63.9% is used for growing crops, while 3.4% is used for orchards or vine crops. Of the unproductive areas, and .

The municipality is located in Frauenfeld District. The current municipality was created in 1998 from the former Munizipalgemeinde (Municipal commune) and the former Ortsbürgergemeinde of Herdern and the village of Lanzenneunforn.

== Demographics ==
Herdern has a population (as of December 2020) of 1,117. As of 2008, 7.6% of the population are foreign nationals. Over the last 10 years (1997–2007) the population has changed at a rate of 5.9%. Most of the population (as of 2000) speaks German (95.5%), with Albanian being second most common ( 1.7%) and French being third ( 0.6%).

As of 2008, the gender distribution of the population was 49.7% male and 50.3% female. The population was made up of 427 Swiss men (45.5% of the population), and 40 (4.3%) non-Swiss men. There were 441 Swiss women (47.0%), and 31 (3.3%) non-Swiss women. In 2008 there were 11 live births to Swiss citizens and 1 birth to non-Swiss citizens, and in same time span there were 5 deaths of Swiss citizens and 1 non-Swiss citizen death. Ignoring immigration and emigration, the population of Swiss citizens increased by 6 while the foreign population remained the same. There were 3 Swiss men who emigrated from Switzerland to another country, 1 Swiss woman who emigrated from Switzerland to another country, 7 non-Swiss men who emigrated from Switzerland to another country and 1 non-Swiss woman who emigrated from Switzerland to another country. The total Swiss population change in 2008 (from all sources) was an increase of 25 and the non-Swiss population change was an increase of 3 people. This represents a population growth rate of 3.1%.

The age distribution, as of 2009, in Herdern is; 111 children or 11.3% of the population are between 0 and 9 years old and 139 teenagers or 14.2% are between 10 and 19. Of the adult population, 107 people or 10.9% of the population are between 20 and 29 years old. 121 people or 12.3% are between 30 and 39, 199 people or 20.3% are between 40 and 49, and 142 people or 14.5% are between 50 and 59. The senior population distribution is 80 people or 8.2% of the population are between 60 and 69 years old, 41 people or 4.2% are between 70 and 79, there are 38 people or 3.9% who are between 80 and 89, and there are 3 people or 0.3% who are 90 and older.

As of 2000 the average number of residents per living room was 0.56 which is about equal to the cantonal average of 0.56 per room. In this case, a room is defined as space of a housing unit of at least 4 m^{2} (43 sq ft) as normal bedrooms, dining rooms, living rooms, kitchens and habitable cellars and attics. About 66.8% of the total households were owner occupied, or in other words did not pay rent (though they may have a mortgage or a rent-to-own agreement). As of 2000, there were 305 private households in the municipality, and an average of 2.9 persons per household.

In 2000 there were 153 single family homes (or 86.4% of the total) out of a total of 177 inhabited buildings. There were 16 two family buildings (9.0%), 2 three family buildings (1.1%) and 6 multi-family buildings (or 3.4%). There were 160 (or 16.8%) persons who were part of a couple without children, and 557 (or 58.3%) who were part of a couple with children. There were 58 (or 6.1%) people who lived in single parent home, while there are 14 persons who were adult children living with one or both parents, 4 persons who lived in a household made up of relatives, 10 who lived in a household made up of unrelated persons, and 81 who are either institutionalized or live in another type of collective housing.

The vacancy rate for the municipality, in 2008, was 1.12%. As of 2007, the construction rate of new housing units was 11 new units per 1000 residents. In 2000 there were 327 apartments in the municipality. The most common apartment size was the 6 room apartment of which there were 112, and there were 3 single room apartments.

In the 2007 federal election the most popular party was the SVP which received 43.22% of the vote. The next three most popular parties were the CVP (21.41%), the FDP (11.13%) and the SP (9.35%). In the federal election, a total of 388 votes were cast, and the voter turnout was 57.7%.

The historical population is given in the following table:

year	population
1850	735
1860	792
1870	758
1880	733
1890	727
1900	741
1950	785
1960	730
1980	714
1990	852
2000	955

== Heritage sites of national significance ==
Schloss Liebenfels (Liebenfels Castle) is listed as a Swiss heritage site of national significance. The area around Liebenfels is designated as part of the Inventory of Swiss Heritage Sites.

== Economy ==
As of 2007, Herdern had an unemployment rate of 1.5%. As of 2005, there were 107 people employed in the primary economic sector and about 40 businesses involved in this sector. 35 people are employed in the secondary sector and there are 11 businesses in this sector. 113 people are employed in the tertiary sector, with 23 businesses in this sector.

In 2000 there were 649 workers who lived in the municipality. Of these, 295 or about 45.5% of the residents worked outside Herdern while 93 people commuted into the municipality for work. There were a total of 447 jobs (of at least 6 hours per week) in the municipality. Of the working population, 7.5% used public transportation to get to work, and 47.3% used a private car.

== Religion ==
From the 2000 census, 395 or 41.4% were Roman Catholic, while 392 or 41.0% belonged to the Swiss Reformed Church. Of the rest of the population, and there are 40 individuals (or about 4.19% of the population) who belong to another Christian church. There were 23 (or about 2.41% of the population) who are Islamic. 71 (or about 7.43% of the population) belong to no church, are agnostic or atheist, and 34 individuals (or about 3.56% of the population) did not answer the question.

== Education ==
In Herdern about 72.5% of the population (between age 25–64) have completed either non-mandatory upper secondary education or additional higher education (either university or a Fachhochschule).

Herdern is home to the Herdern-Dettighofen primary school district. In the primary school district there are 126 students who are in kindergarten or the primary level. There are 25 children in the kindergarten, and the average class size is 12.5 kindergartners. Of the children in kindergarten, 15 or 60.0% are female, 1 or 4.0% are not Swiss citizens and 1 or 4.0% do not speak German natively. The lower and upper primary levels begin at about age 5-6 and lasts for 6 years. There are 49 children in who are at the lower primary level and 52 children in the upper primary level. The average class size in the primary school is 16.83 students. At the lower primary level, there are 22 children or 44.9% of the total population who are female, and 3 or 6.1% do not speak German natively. In the upper primary level, there are 28 or 53.8% who are female, 3 or 5.8% are not Swiss citizens and 4 or 7.7% do not speak German natively.
