= Freudenfels Castle =

Castle in Eschenz, Switzerland

Coordinates: 47°38′20″N 8°53′24″E

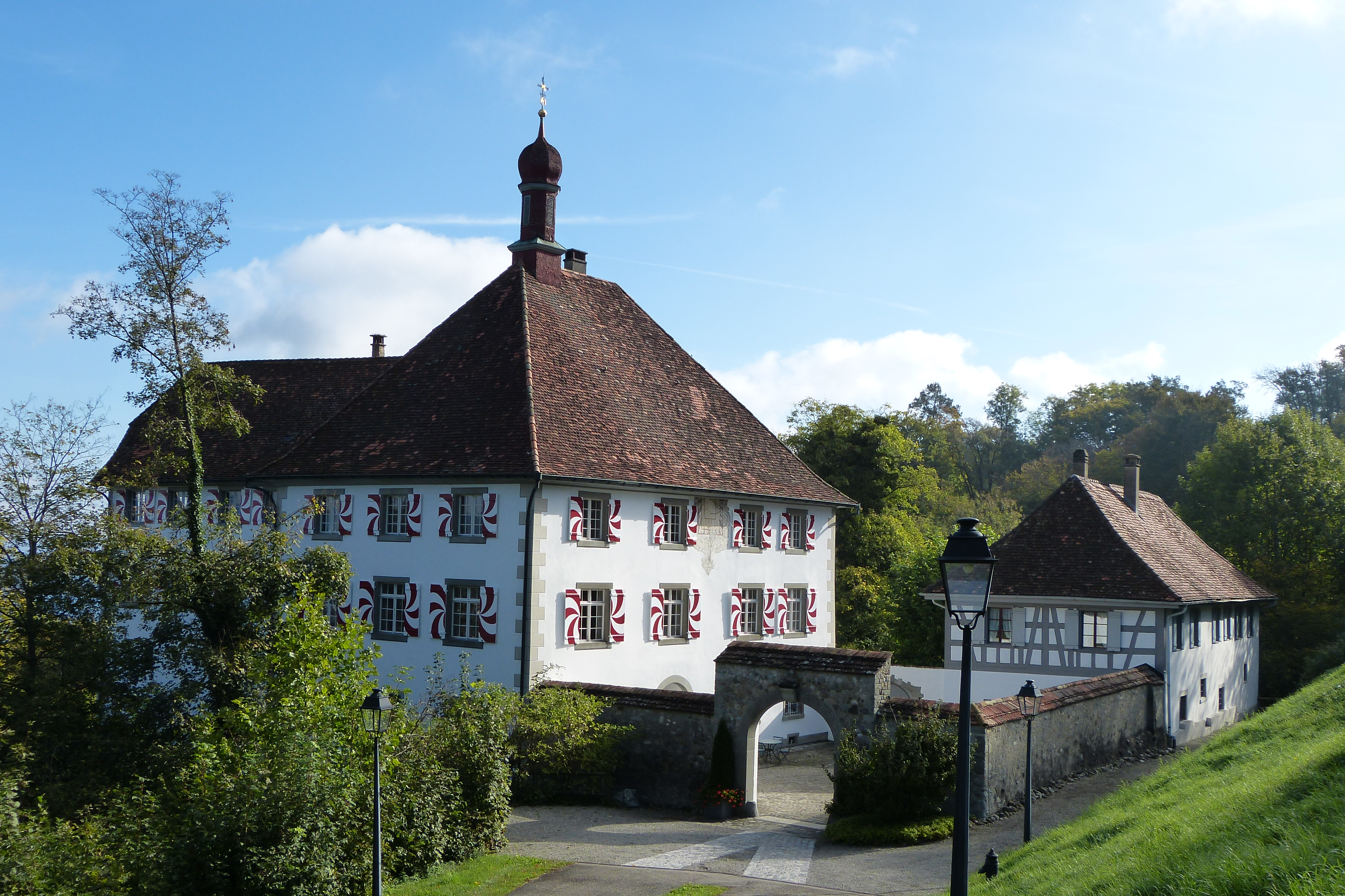
Freudenfels Castle from the southwest

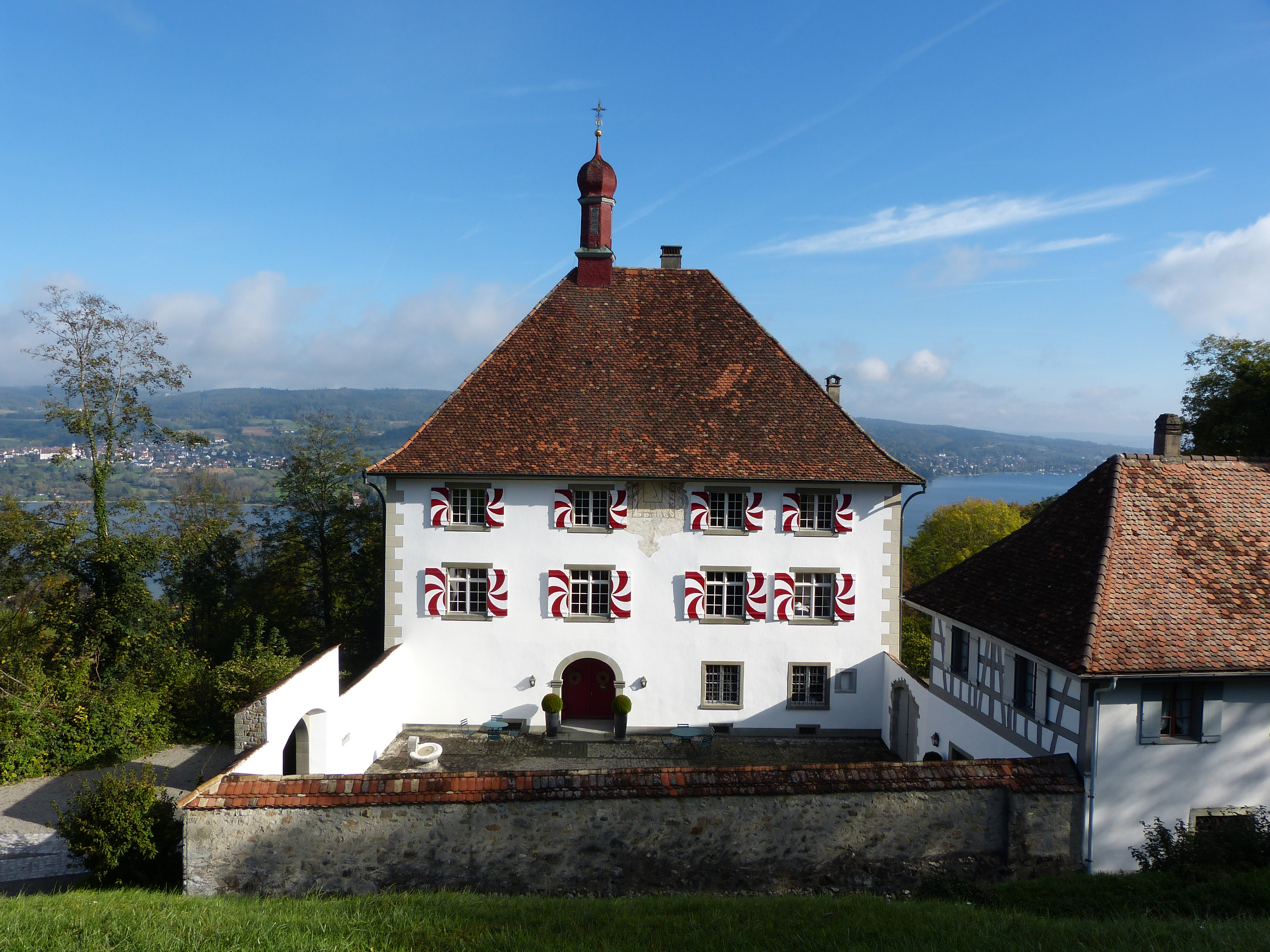
Freudenfels Castle from the south

Freudenfels Castle is a castle in the municipality of Eschenz of the Canton of Thurgau in Switzerland. It is a Swiss heritage site of national significance.

== See also ==
- List of castles in Switzerland
