= Roggwil, Thurgau =

Roggwil
- Municipality
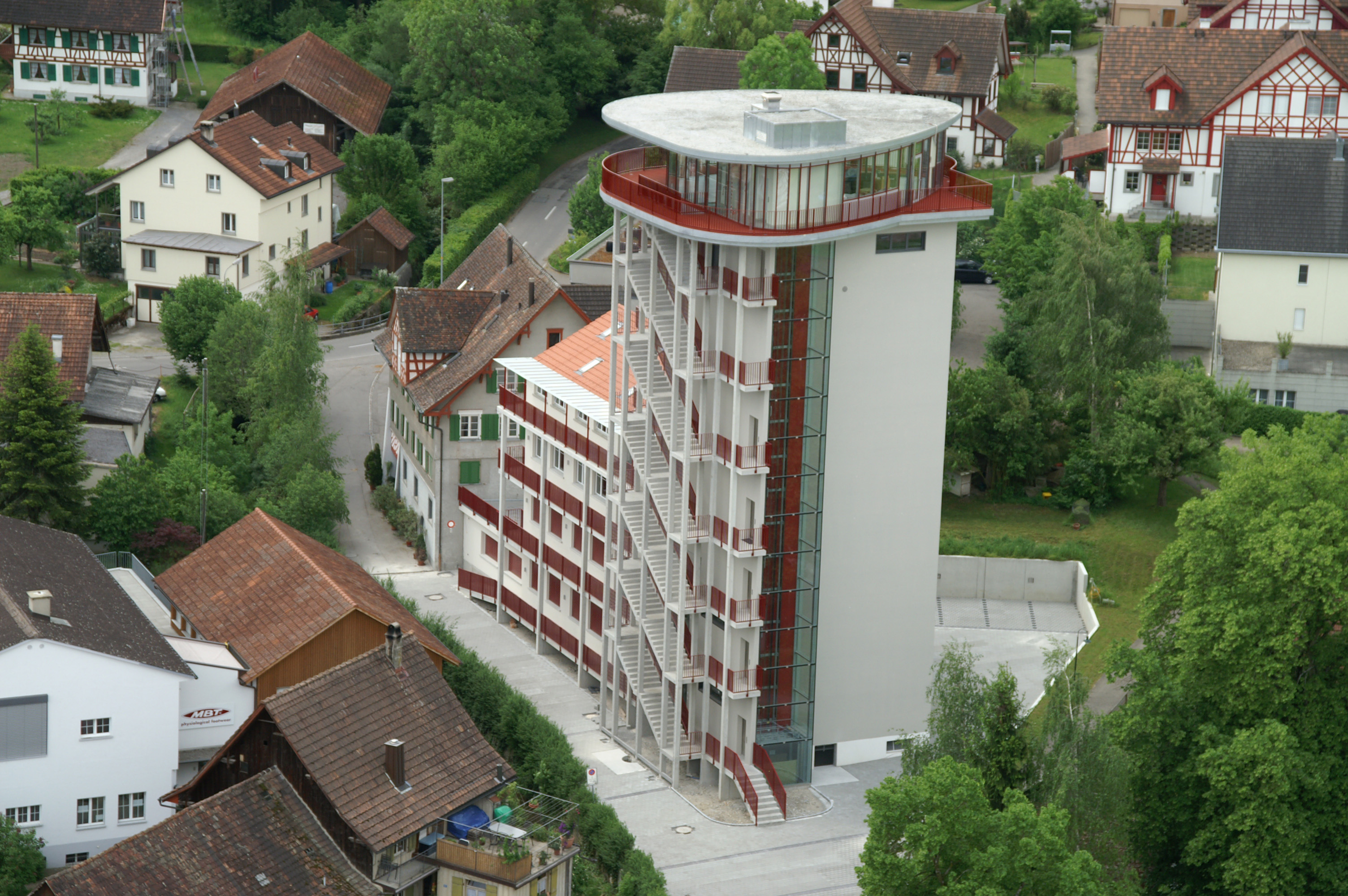

- Coat of arms
- Location of Roggwil
- Location within Switzerland Location within Canton of Thurgau
- Coordinates: 47°30′N 9°24′E
- Country: Switzerland
- Canton: Thurgau
- District: Arbon

Area
  - Total: 12.04 km^{2} (4.65 sq mi)
- Elevation: 440 m (1,440 ft)

Population (December 2007)
  - Total: 2,806
  - Density: 233.1/km^{2} (603.6/sq mi)
- Time zone: UTC+01:00 (CET)
  - Summer (DST): UTC+02:00 (CEST)
- Postal code: 9325
- SFOS number: 4431
- ISO 3166 code: CH-TG
- Surrounded by: Arbon, Berg (SG), Egnach, Häggenschwil (SG), Wittenbach (SG)
- Website: www.roggwil-tg.ch

Roggwil is a municipality in the district of Arbon in the canton of Thurgau in Switzerland.

== History ==
Roggwil is first mentioned in 854 as Megenberti de Rocconwilare when it became part of the holdings of the Bishop of Constance. In the mid-13th century, these rights were ceded to the Freiherr von Hagenwil. In 1264, the low justice rights over Hagenwil and Roggwil went to the Abbey of St. Gall. In 1364 the court rights acquired by the Breitenlandenberg family, who held the rights until 1432. Then, between 1513 and 1684 the Bernhausen family acquired these rights, and from 1685 to 1798 they were held by the village itself. Around 1420, Mötteli von Rappenstein bought the tower, which he expanded to a castle. of the tower, she extensions to the castle (from 1517 to 1798 outside space). In 1578, the castle was inherited by Studer von Winkelbach, in 1650 it passed on to the Bernhausens, and from 1740 to 1805 it was in possession of the monastery.

Aerial view from 600 m by Walter Mittelholzer (1923)

In 900, Roggwil became part of the parish of Arbon, and the Catholics have remained part of that parish into the 21st century. In 1870, 78% of the population belonged to the Swiss Reformed Church, in 1910 it was 71% and in 2000 the number had dropped to only 51%. Until the construction of the Church of St. Otmar in 1963, the local Catholics visited church services in Arbon and Berg in St. Gallen.

In the second third of the 19th century there were the two primary school districts, Roggwil and Freidorf-Watt in the village.

== Geography ==
Roggwil has an area, as of 2009, of 12.04 square kilometers (4.65 sq mi). Of this area, 8.83 km^{2} (3.41 sq mi) or 73.3% is used for agricultural purposes, while 1.5 km^{2} (0.58 sq mi) or 12.5% is forested. Of the rest of the land, 1.56 km^{2} (0.60 sq mi) or 13.0% is settled (buildings or roads) and 0.02 km^{2} (4.9 acres) or 0.2% is unproductive land.

Of the built up area, industrial buildings made up 6.7% of the total area while housing and buildings made up 0.7% and transportation infrastructure made up 0.2%. while parks, green belts and sports fields made up 5.0%. Out of the forested land, 9.2% of the total land area is heavily forested and 3.2% is covered with orchards or small clusters of trees. Of the agricultural land, 50.7% is used for growing crops, while 22.7% is used for orchards or vine crops.

The municipality is located in the Arbon district, on the Arbon-St. Gallen road. It consists of the villages of Ober- and Unter-Roggwil which grew together and a number of hamletsincluding Mammertshofen.

== Demographics ==
Roggwil has a population (as of December 2020) of 3,257. As of 2008, 9.4% of the population are foreign nationals. Over the last 10 years (1997–2007) the population has changed at a rate of 22.2%. Most of the population (as of 2000) speaks German (95.7%), with Italian being second most common (1.0%) and English being third (0.5%).

As of 2008, the gender distribution of the population was 49.6% male and 50.4% female. The population was made up of 1,295 Swiss men (44.8% of the population), and 141 (4.9%) non-Swiss men. There were 1,325 Swiss women (45.8%), and 132 (4.6%) non-Swiss women.

In 2008 there were 32 live births to Swiss citizens and births to non-Swiss citizens, and in same time span there were 13 deaths of Swiss citizens and 1 non-Swiss citizen death. Ignoring immigration and emigration, the population of Swiss citizens increased by 19 while the foreign population decreased by 1. There was 1 Swiss man, 2 Swiss women who emigrated from Switzerland to another country, 16 non-Swiss men who emigrated from Switzerland to another country and 18 non-Swiss women who emigrated from Switzerland to another country. The total Swiss population change in 2008 (from all sources) was an increase of 40 and the non-Swiss population change was an increase of 40 people. This represents a population growth rate of 2.8%.

The age distribution, as of 2009, in Roggwil is; 387 children or 13.5% of the population are between 0 and 9 years old and 379 teenagers or 13.2% are between 10 and 19. Of the adult population, 275 people or 9.6% of the population are between 20 and 29 years old. 362 people or 12.6% are between 30 and 39, 549 people or 19.1% are between 40 and 49, and 385 people or 13.4% are between 50 and 59. The senior population distribution is 286 people or 10.0% of the population are between 60 and 69 years old, 149 people or 5.2% are between 70 and 79, there are 91 people or 3.2% who are between 80 and 89, and there are 9 people or 0.3% who are 90 and older.

As of 2000, there were 934 private households in the municipality, and an average of 2.6 persons per household. In 2000 there were 408 single family homes (or 82.4% of the total) out of a total of 495 inhabited buildings. There were 38 two family buildings (7.7%), 11 three family buildings (2.2%) and 38 multi-family buildings (or 7.7%). There were 574 (or 23.3%) persons who were part of a couple without children, and 1,452 (or 59.0%) who were part of a couple with children. There were 103 (or 4.2%) people who lived in single parent home, while there are 32 persons who were adult children living with one or both parents, 7 persons who lived in a household made up of relatives, 25 who lived in a household made up of unrelated persons, and 46 who are either institutionalized or live in another type of collective housing.

The vacancy rate for the municipality, in 2008, was 0.78%. As of 2007, the construction rate of new housing units was 7.8 new units per 1000 residents. In 2000 there were 984 apartments in the municipality. The most common apartment size was the 4 room apartment of which there were 263. There were 9 single room apartments and 248 apartments with six or more rooms.

In the 2007 federal election the most popular party was the SVP which received 47.51% of the vote. The next three most popular parties were the CVP (13.77%), the SP (11.76%) and the FDP (11.01%). In the federal election, a total of 837 votes were cast, and the voter turnout was 43.0%.

The historical population is given in the following table:

year	population
1850	1,284
1870	1,239
1880	1,182
1900	1,289
1910	1,495
1950	1,542
1990	1,762
2000	2,462

== Heritage sites of national significance ==
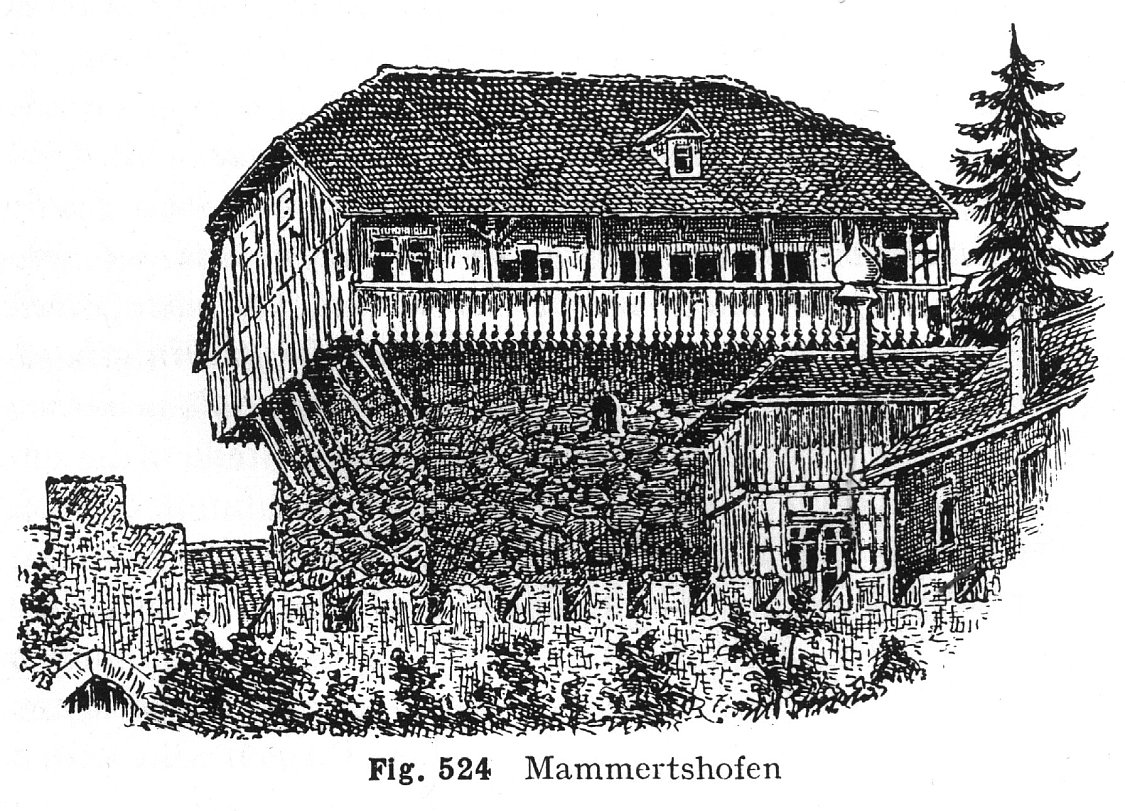
Mammertshofen Castle

The Gasthof Traube, and Mammertshofen Castle are listed as Swiss heritage site of national significance. The village of Roggwil and the hamlet of Watt bei Roggwil are listed as part of the Inventory of Swiss Heritage Sites.

== Economy ==
As of 2007, Roggwil had an unemployment rate of 1.21%. As of 2005, there were 206 people employed in the primary economic sector and about 59 businesses involved in this sector. 512 people are employed in the secondary sector and there are 27 businesses in this sector. 405 people are employed in the tertiary sector, with 87 businesses in this sector.

In 2000 there were 1,732 workers who lived in the municipality. Of these, 957 or about 55.3% of the residents worked outside Roggwil while 609 people commuted into the municipality for work. There were a total of 1,384 jobs (of at least 6 hours per week) in the municipality. Of the working population, 15.6% used public transportation to get to work, and 51.1% used a private car.

Local industry includes the shoe manufacturer kybun Corporation of Karl Müller, pharmaceutical firm A. Vogel, and a small brewery, Huus-Braui.

== Religion ==
From the 2000 census, 929 or 37.7% were Roman Catholic, while 1,220 or 49.6% belonged to the Swiss Reformed Church. Of the rest of the population, there were 2 Old Catholics (or about 0.08% of the population) who belonged to the Christian Catholic Church of Switzerland there are 11 individuals (or about 0.45% of the population) who belong to the Orthodox Church, and there are 46 individuals (or about 1.87% of the population) who belong to another Christian church. There were 6 (or about 0.24% of the population) who are Islamic. There are 2 individuals (or about 0.08% of the population) who belong to another church (not listed on the census), 161 (or about 6.54% of the population) belong to no church, are agnostic or atheist, and 85 individuals (or about 3.45% of the population) did not answer the question.

== Transport ==
Roggwil sits on the Bodensee–Toggenburg line between Romanshorn and St. Gallen and is served by the St. Gallen S-Bahn at Roggwil-Berg railway station.

== Education ==
In Roggwil about 81.7% of the population (between age 25 and 64) have completed either non-mandatory upper secondary education or additional higher education (either university or a Fachhochschule).

Roggwil is home to the Roggwil primary school district. In the 2008/2009 school year there are 122 students. There are 31 children in the kindergarten, and the average class size is 15.5 kindergartners. Of the children in kindergarten, 14 or 45.2% are female, 1 or 3.2% was not a Swiss citizen. The lower and upper primary levels begin at about age 5-6 and lasts for 6 years. There are 45 children in who are at the lower primary level and 46 children in the upper primary level. The average class size in the primary school is 18.2 students. At the lower primary level, there are 24 children or 53.3% of the total population who are female. In the upper primary level, there are 19 or 41.3% who are female, 1 or 2.2% is not a Swiss citizen.
