= Seedorf Castle =

Coordinates: 46.88552°N 8.60643°E

Seedorf Castle (also called Turmmatt Castle) is a medieval castle ruin in the municipality of Seedorf in the canton of Uri in Switzerland. It is near the school complex of Seedorf and across the street from the newer castle of Apro. It has an outer moat and a tower on each corner.

== See also ==
List of castles and fortresses in Switzerland
