= Bernegg Castle =

Bernegg Castle may refer to:

- Bernegg Castle, Graubünden, Switzerland
- Bernegg Castle, Thurgau, Switzerland
