= Klingenhorn Castle =

- Malans
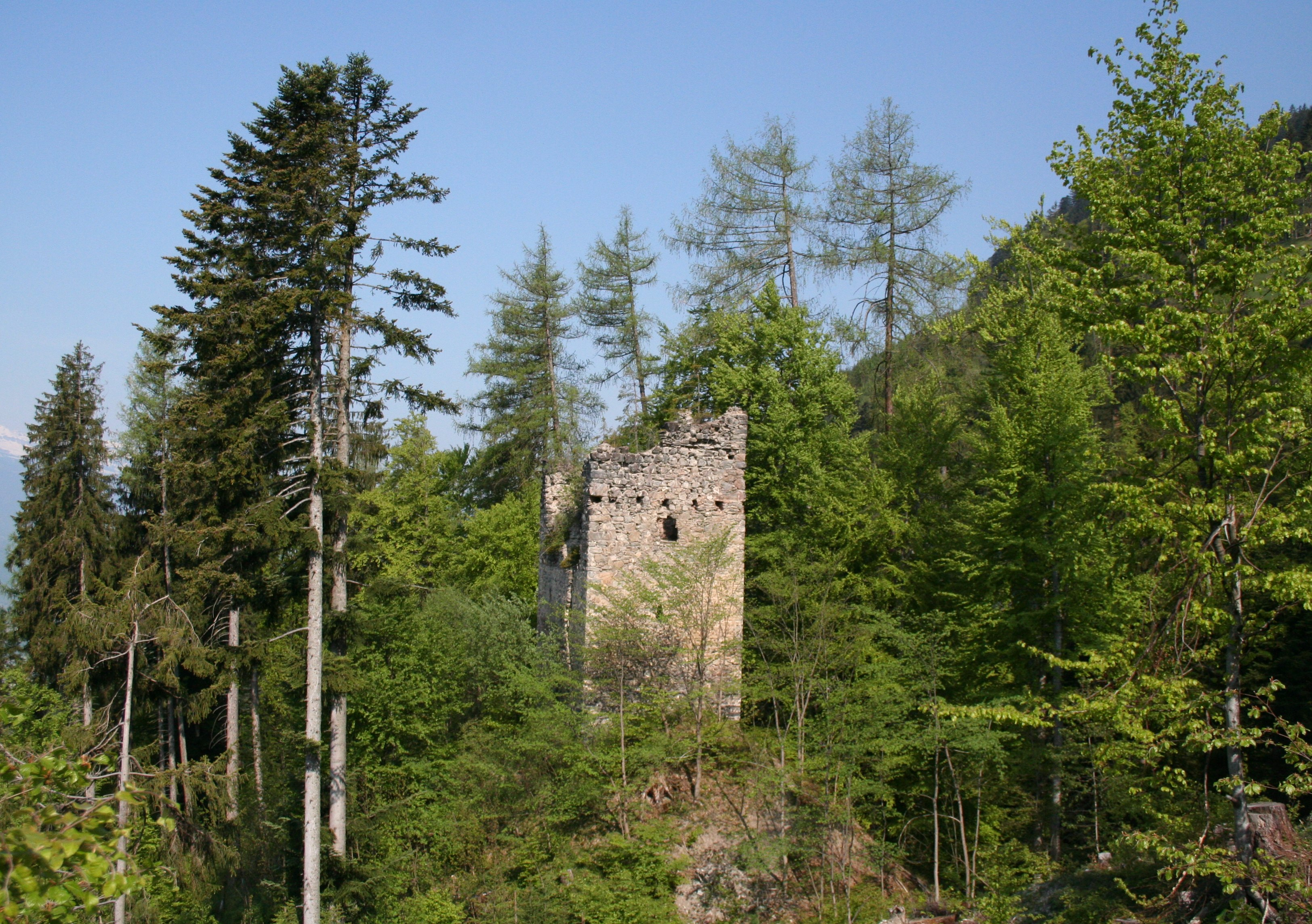
- Ruins of Klingenhorn Castle

Site information
- Type: hill castle
- Code: CH-GR
- Condition: ruin

Location
- Coordinates: 46°59′39″N 9°34′46.46″E
- Height: 934 m above the sea

Site history
- Built: 13th century

Klingenhorn Castle is a ruined castle in the municipality of Malans of the Canton of Graubünden in Switzerland.

== History ==
While nothing is known about the castle's foundation, it was probably built in the 13th century perhaps for the Lords of Vaz or of Aspermont. It was probably held by a ministerialis family, unfree knights in service to a higher noble. By 1372 it was owned by the von Matsch family, who offered it as collateral for 200 marks from Rudolf von Underwegen. Part of the agreement stipulated that the castle must remain open to the Matsch family at any time. In 1420 it was mentioned as the property of Ulrich Seger, the vogt and judge over Malans, but the castle appears to have been uninhabitable at that time. It appears that the castle was probably gutted by a fire. By 1441 it appears to have been a ruin. Around 1470 the Schlandersberg family acquired the castle and in 1497 Deipold von Schlandersburg granted the ruins and the castle hill to Hans Sutter of Malans. However, if he was to rebuild the castle he had to return the hill to them. The castle was never rebuilt.

== Castle site ==
The castle is located on a hill above the village of Malans. The ruins are visible from the valley floor. The tower is protected by a ditch which encircles much of the hilltop. The main tower still shows the Pietra Rasa construction, where the mortar that holds the rough stones together is also used as a plaster to them. After plastering with mortar, lines are incised into the mortar to give the appearance of regular bricks or stones. Only three stories of the tower are still standing and a high entrance on the second story, which was later walled up, is still visible. Two fireplaces built into the walls can still be seen. The castle was protected with a dry stone wall, parts of which are still standing.

== Gallery ==
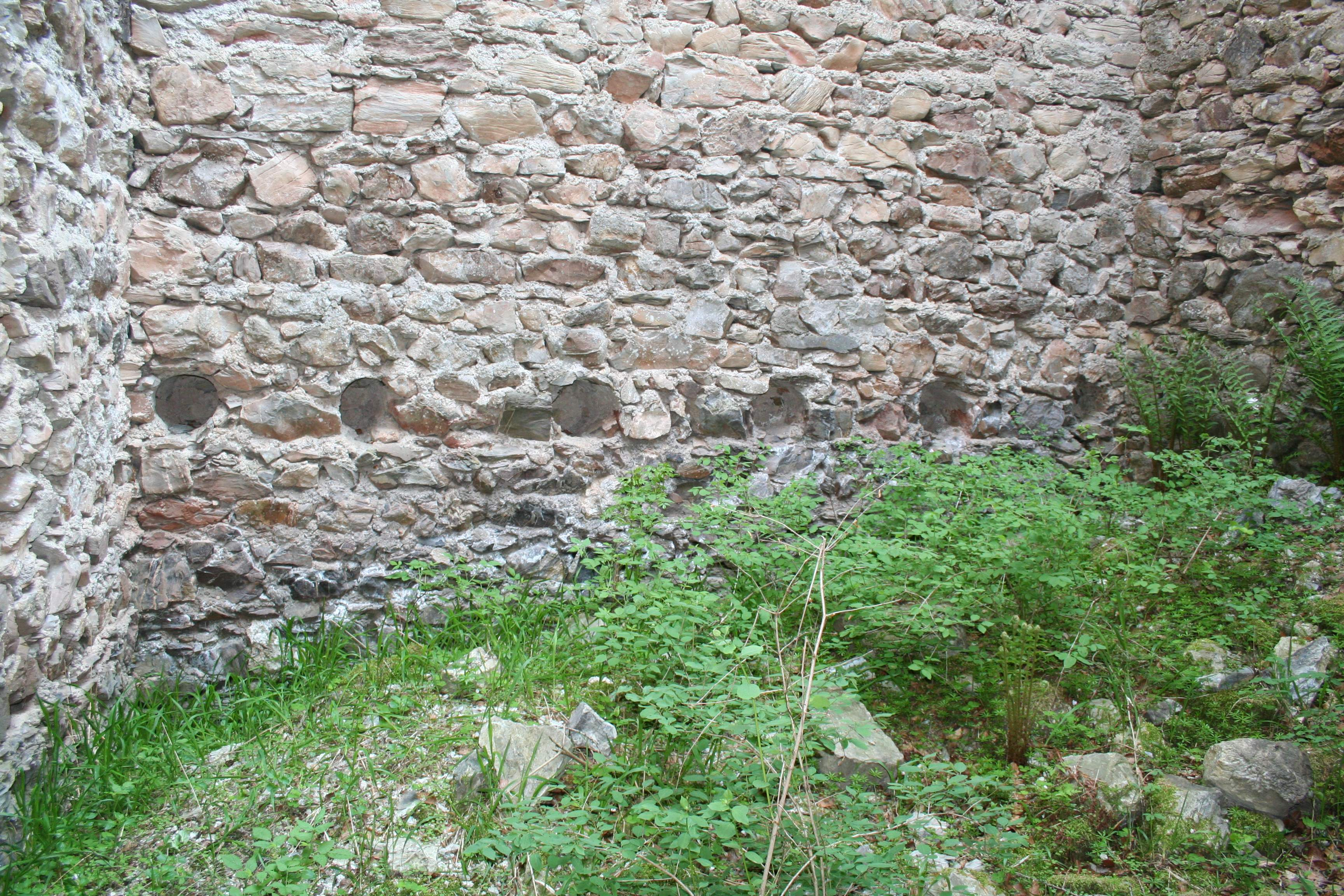
Holes for wooden beams to support the floor inside the tower

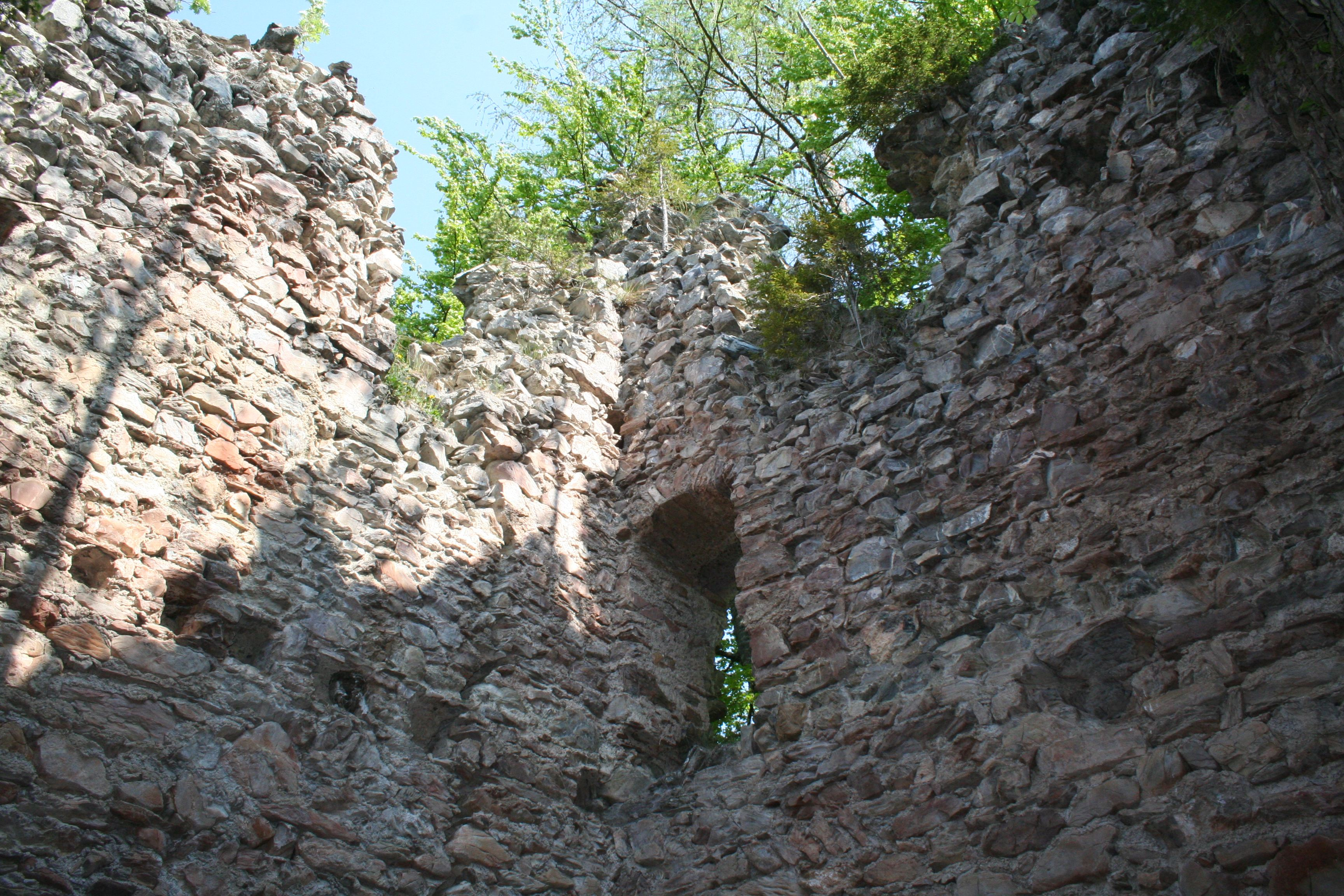
Interior of the tower

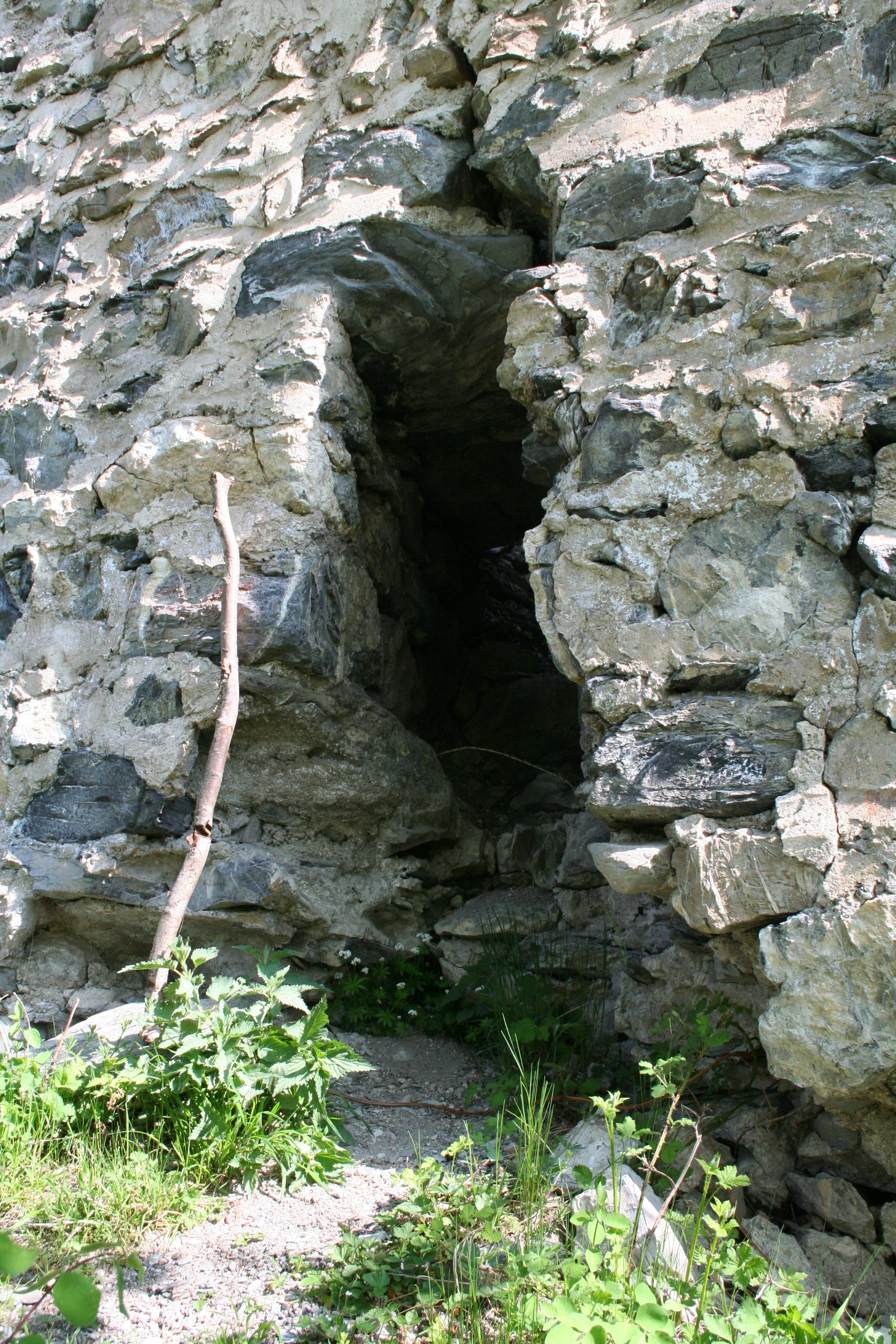
Exterior view of the tower entrance

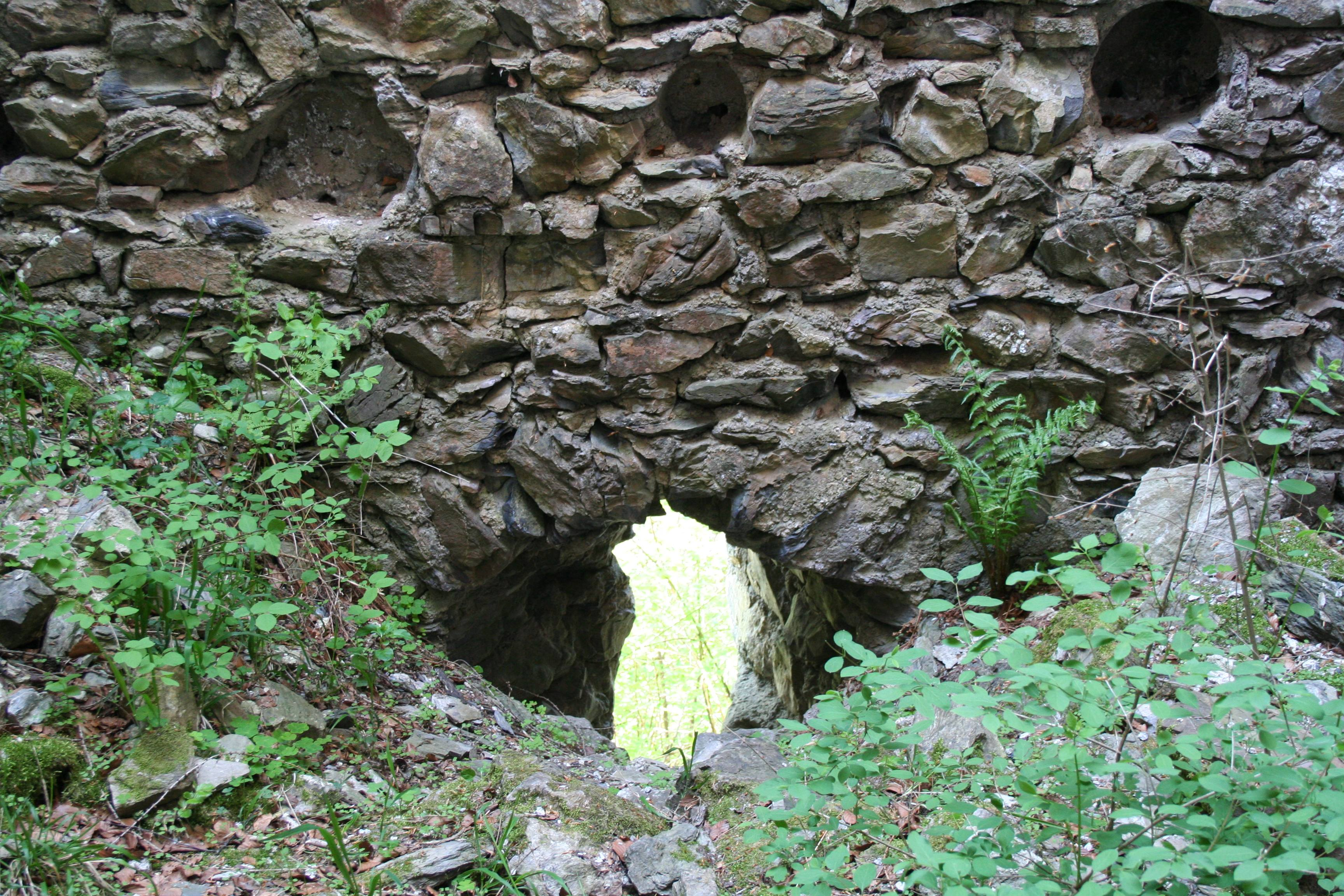
Interior of the entrance

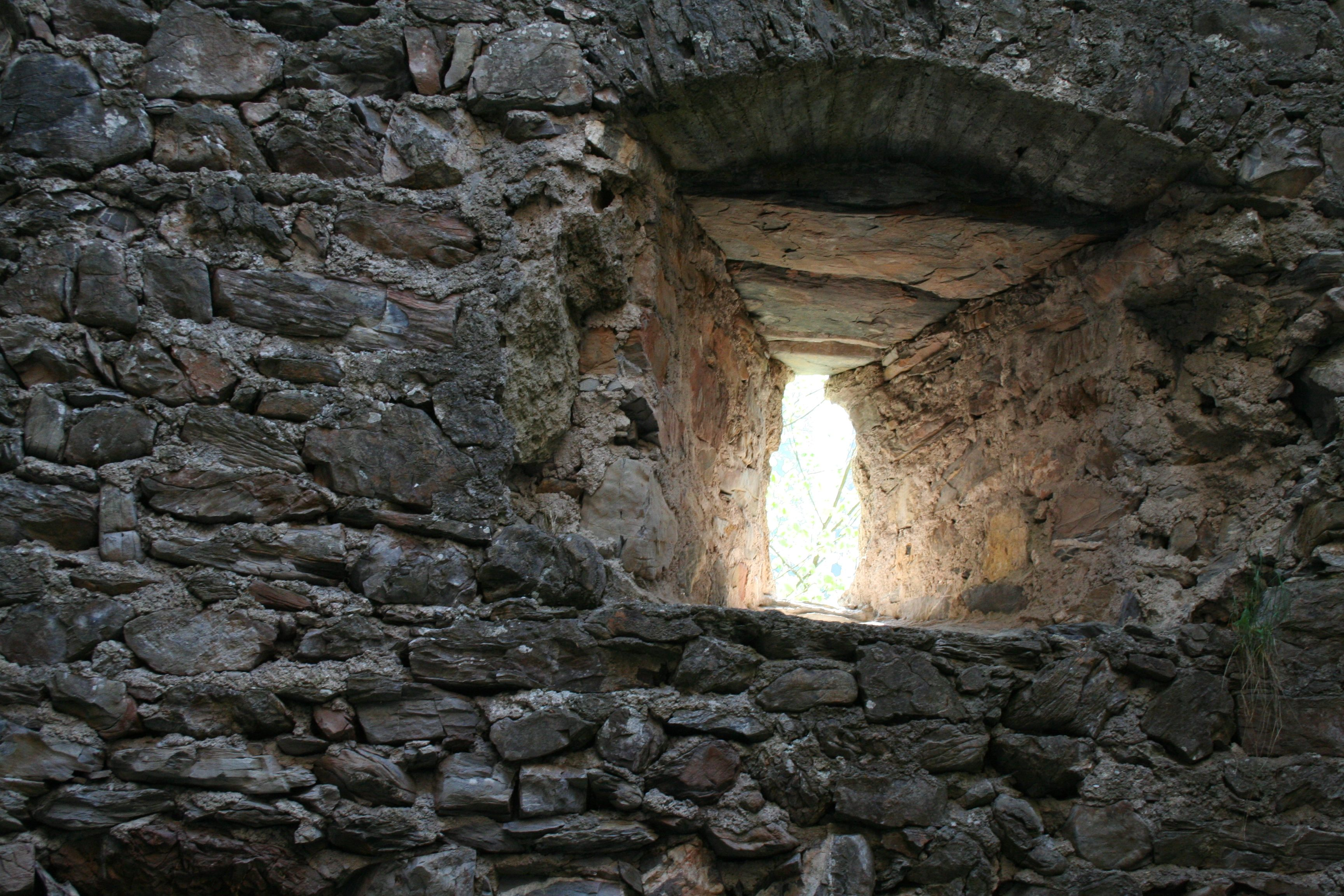
A window inside the tower

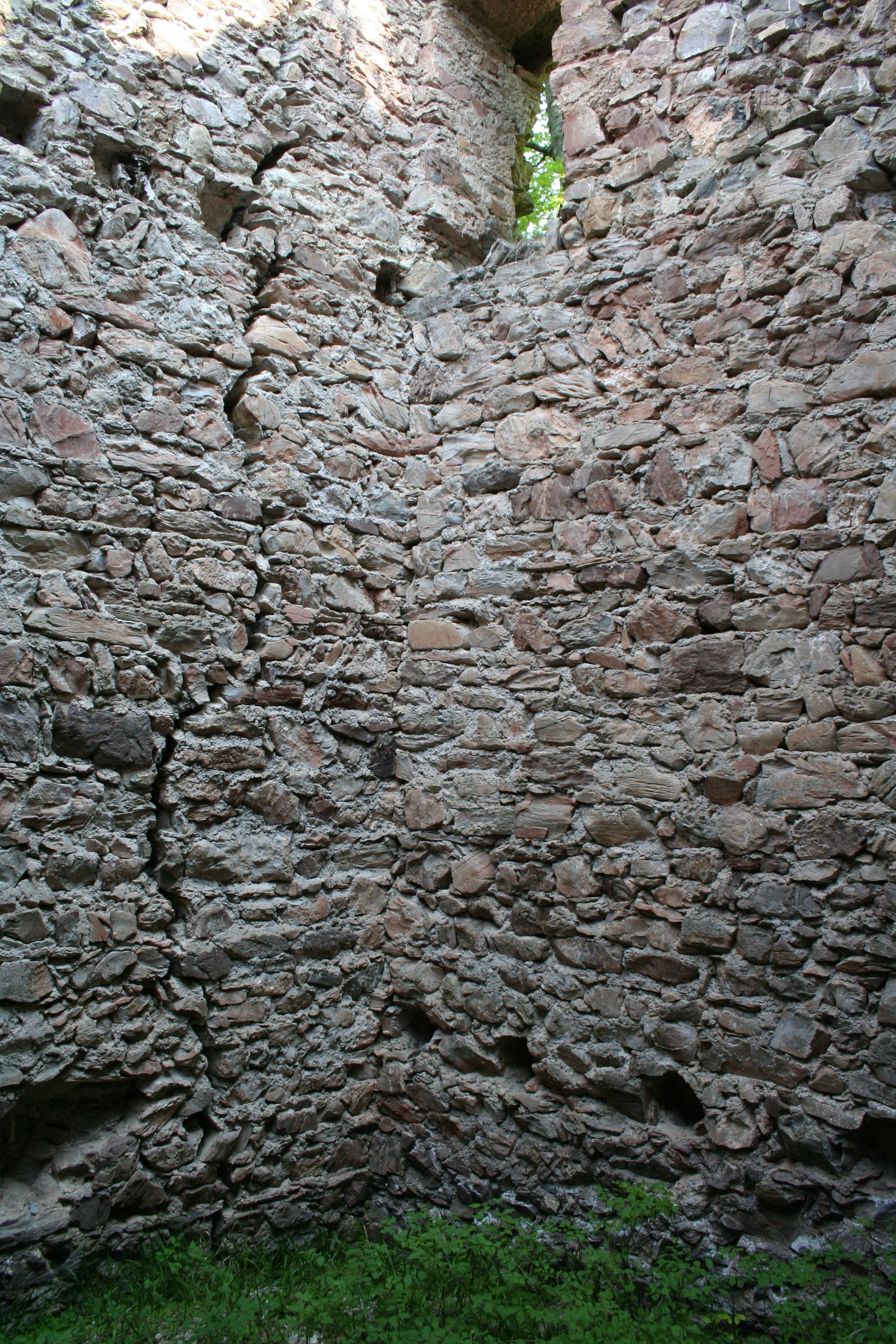
Interior of the tower

== See also ==
- List of castles in Switzerland
