= Klingnau Castle =

Castle in Klingnau, Switzerland

- Schloss Klingnau
- Klingnau
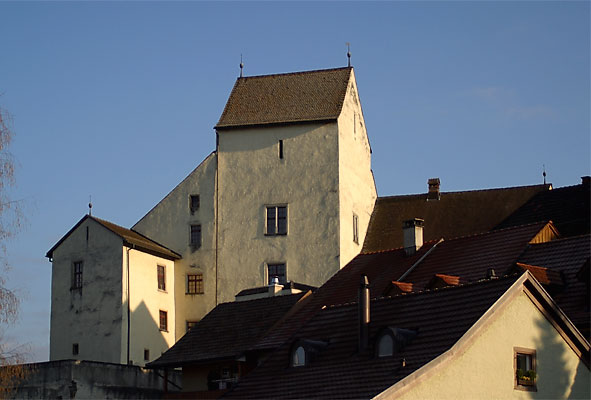
- Klingnau Castle

Site information
- Type: Castle
- Code: CH-AG

Location
- Coordinates: 47°34′51.75″N 8°14′54.29″E
- Height: 321 m

Site history
- Built: After 1239

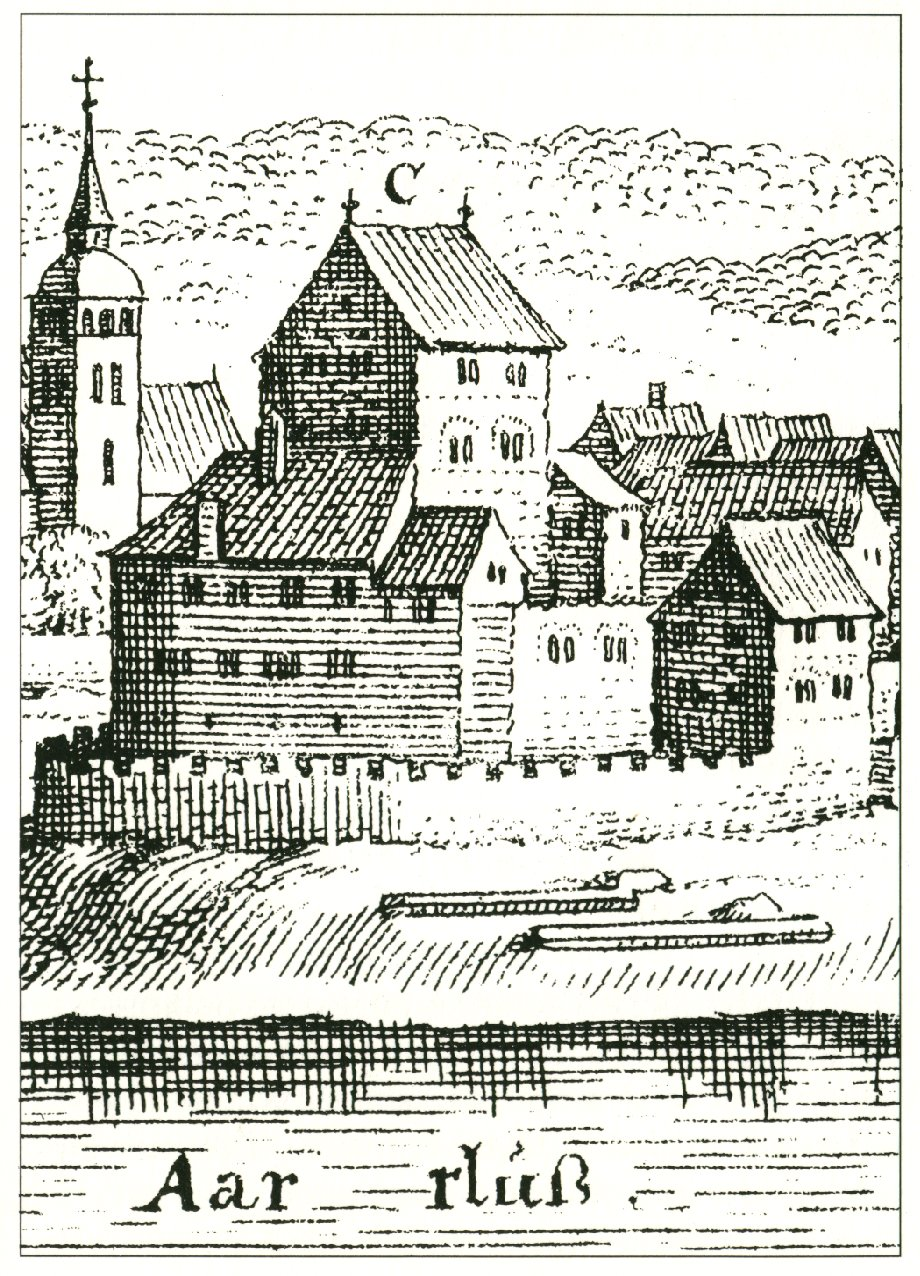
Drawing of the castle from about 1642

Klingnau Castle (German: Schloss Klingnau) is a castle in the municipality of Klingnau in the Swiss canton of Aargau.

== History ==
The construction of the castle, originally the seat of the Klingen family, was started in 1240. Until 1269 a manor house stood on the grounds. After 1331 the outer walls were added. In the second half of the 14th century the Bishop of Constance was often a resident in the castle. He ordered further improvements and expansions. In the late 16th century, the castle, which was the seat of the bailiff from Constance, in such bad condition that the Swiss Confederation demanded a renovation from the bishop. In 1804 the castle went to the newly formed Canton of Aargau, who auctioned it off in 1817. As a result it has been used by various industries, until the 20th century when it was taken over by a foundation.

== See also ==
- List of castles and fortresses in Switzerland
