= Belp Castle =

Castle in Belp, Switzerland

Coordinates: 46.892701°N 7.501996°E

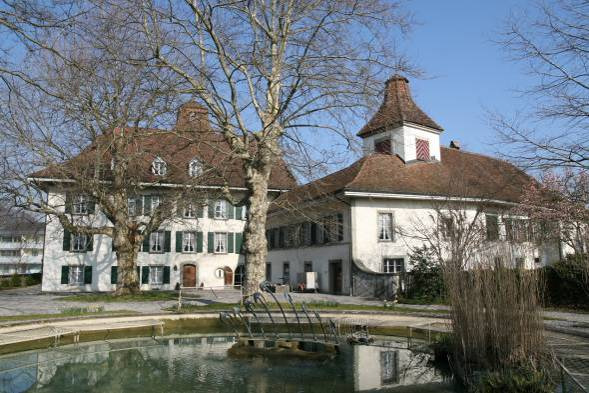
Belp Castle

Belp Castle (German: Schloss Belp) is a castle in the municipality of Belp in the canton of Bern in Switzerland.

== See also ==
- List of castles in Switzerland
