= List of castles and fortresses in Switzerland =

Ringgenberg

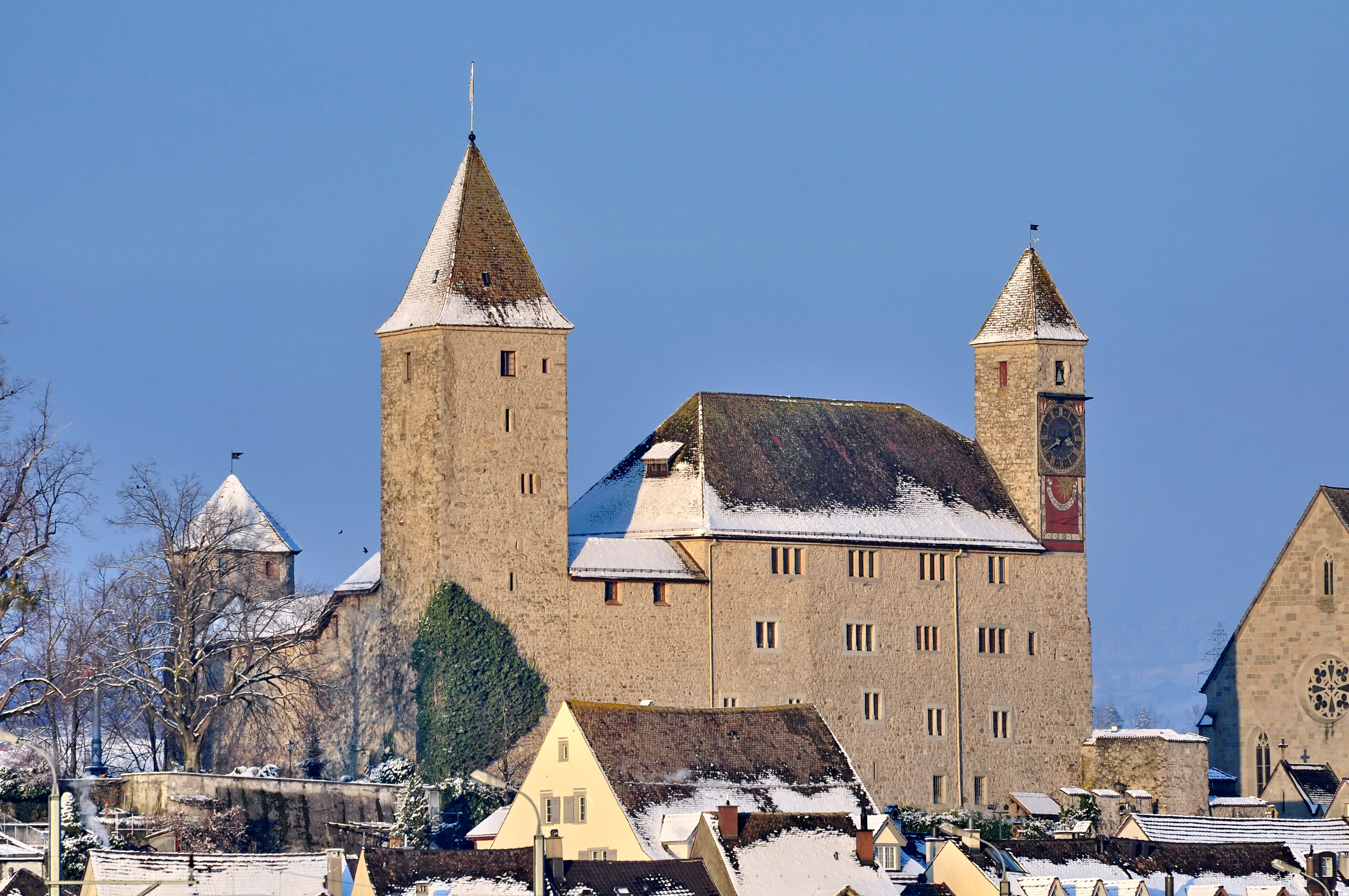
Schloss Rapperswil as seen from Seedamm (December 2009)

This list includes castles and fortresses in Switzerland.

Entries list the name and location of the castle, fortress or ruins in each Canton in Switzerland.

== Aargau ==
Castles in Aargau

| Name | Image | Location | Type | Date | Notes |
|---|---|---|---|---|---|
| Aarburg Castle | | Aarburg; 47°19′17.91″N 7°54′3.36″E | | 12th century, 1659–1673 | Houses Kantonale Jugendheim, for juvenile offenders |
| Altenburg Castle | | Brugg; 47°28′55.24″N 8°11′39.62″E | | Roman fort 370; Medieval castle 10th century | Includes part of a Roman wall. Today a youth hostel |
| Auenstein Castle | | Auenstein; 47°24′55.48″N 8°8′23.17″E | | 13th century | Privately owned, not open to the public |
| Bernau Castle | | Leibstadt; 47°35′43″N 8°10′20″E | Ruined hill castle | 1157 | Ruined castle, destroyed in 1844 |
| Biberstein Castle | | Biberstein; 47°24′47.60″N 8°5′0.70″E | | around 1280 | Group home for adults |
| Böttstein Castle | | Böttstein; 47°33′14.80″N 8°13′27.23″E | | 1100–1200 | Became headquarters of Beznau Nuclear Power Plant construction in 1965, converted to restaurant and hotel in 1974 |
| Brestenberg Castle | | Seengen; 47°19′11.50″N 8°12′29.52″E | | 1625 | Museum |
| Brunegg Castle | | Brunegg; 47°25′19.78″N 8°12′52.16″E | | 13th century | |
| Freudenau Castle | | Untersiggenthal; 47°30′44.5″N 8°14′2.5″E | Ruined lowland castle | around 1240 | Ruined castle |
| Habsburg Castle | | Habsburg; 47°27′45.86″N 8°10′51.74″E | hill castle, summit location | Around 1020/30 to 1300 | Original home of the Habsburg family |
| Hallwyl Castle | | Seengen; 47°19′23.5″N 8°11′39″E | water castle | 1265 | Part of Cantonal Museum |
| Hilfikon Castle | | Hilfikon; 47°19′51″N 8°14′49″E | | 1290 | |
| Alt Homberg Castle | | Wittnau, Aargau; 47.491056°N 7.972999°E | Ruined castle | around 1100 | Only fragments still visible |
| Horben Castle | | Beinwil (Freiamt); 47°13′12.29″N 8°19′36.34″E | | 1700 | Privately owned |
| Iberg Castle | | Iberg, Riniken; 47°30′20.01″N 8°11′12.64″E | Ruined hill castle | 11th century | |
| Kasteln Castle | | Oberflachs; 47°26′32.57″N 8°07′08.87″E | | 1238 | School for special needs students |
| Klingnau Castle | | Klingnau; 47°34′51.75″N 8°14′54.29″E | Castle | After 1239 | Residence of Bishop of Constance in 14th century. Today privately owned |
| Landvogtei Castle | | Baden | | | |
| Laufenburg Castle | | Laufenburg | | | |
| Lenzburg Castle | | Lenzburg; 47°23′15″N 8°11′08″E | hill castle | before 1036 | Originally home of the Counts of Lenzburg. Now part of the Cantonal Museum |
| Liebegg Castle | | Gränichen; 47°20′11″N 8°07′04″E | hill castle | 1150-1200 | Cantonal Agricultural School beginning 1958. Between 1983 and 1998 home to the Cantonal Teacher's College |
| Rued Castle | | Schlossrued | | | |
| Schafisheim Castle | | Schafisheim | | | |
| Schwarzwasserstelz Castle | | Fisibach | | | |
| Schenkenberg Castle | | Thalheim; 47°26′31.16″N 8°06′2.66″E | Ruined hill castle | 1243 | Originally residence of ministeriales family. |
| Schlössli | | Aarau | | | |
| Schöftland Castle | | Schöftland | | | |
| Schwarzer Turm | | Brugg | | | |
| Stein Castle | | Baden; 47°28′23.38″N 8°18′19.62″E | hill castle | Before 1000, 1658–1670 | Destroyed in 1415 by the Swiss Confederation. Rebuilt in 1658-70, demolished in 1712 |
| Alt-Thierstein Castle | | Gipf-Oberfrick | Ruined Castle | | |
| Tegerfelden Castle | | Tegerfelden | | | |
| Trostburg Castle | | Teufenthal; 47°19′51.38″N 8°07′06.49″E | hill castle | 1200 | 19th century music box factory, partially repaired in 1999 |
| Urgiz Castle | | Densbüren | Ruined Castle | | |
| Waldhausen Castle | | Fisibach | | | |
| Alt-Wartburg Castle | | Oftringen | | | |
| Wildenstein Castle | | Veltheim | | | |
| Wildegg Castle | | Möriken-Wildegg | | 1242 | |

== Appenzell Ausserrhoden ==
Castles in Appenzell Ausserrhoden

| Name | Image | Location | Type | Date | Notes |
|---|---|---|---|---|---|
| Rosenberg | | Herisau-Burghalden; 47°23′47″N 9°16′55″E | Ruined hill castle | about 1150 | Ruined castle |
| Rosenburg/Ramsenberg | | Herisau; 47°23′18″N 9°15′16″E | Ruined hill castle | about 1150 | Ruined castle |
| Urstein Castle | | Herisau; 47°23′07″N 9°19′28″E | | | |

== Appenzell Innerrhoden ==
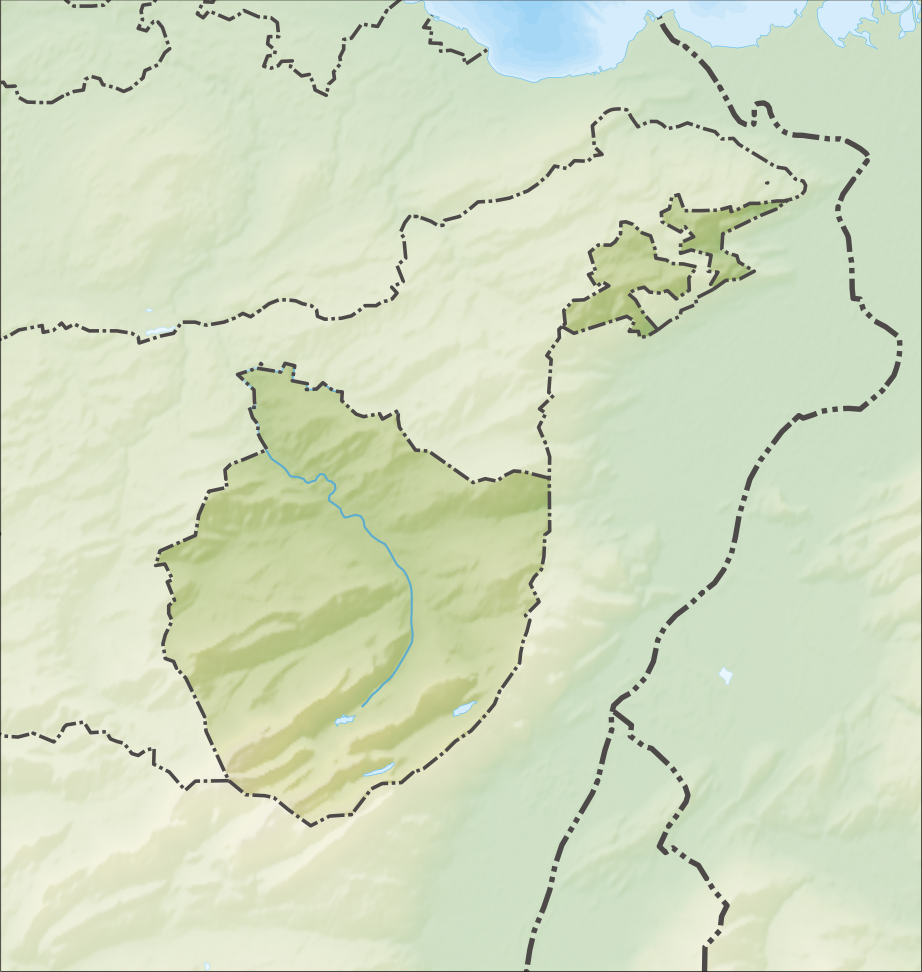
Castles in Appenzell Innerrhoden

| Name | Image | Location | Type | Date | Notes |
|---|---|---|---|---|---|
| Appenzell Castle | | Appenzell; 47°19′48″N 9°24′35″E | Manor house | 1563 | Original owner Antoni Löw executed 1584. 1584-1682 used as Franciscan monastery. Today known as "Doctor's House" and privately owned. |
| Clanx Castle | | Appenzell; 47°20′50″N 9°24′40″E | Ruined castle | 1219 | Burned during Appenzell Wars. Ruins rediscovered in 1885. |
| Hoch-Altstätten Castle | | Oberegg; 47°24′01″N 9°32′40″E | Ruins | | |

== Basel-Land ==
Castles in Basel-Land

| Name | Image | Location | Type | Date | Notes |
|---|---|---|---|---|---|
| Aesch Castle | | Aesch; 47°27′12″N 07°35′39″E | Manor house | 1606 | Now municipal administration building |
| Altenberg Castle | | Füllinsdorf; 47°30′34.31″N 7°44′23.84″E | Ruins | about 1000 | |
| Angenstein Castle | | Duggingen; 47°27′47.89″N 7°36′17.3″E | Partly ruined hill castle | Mid 13th century | |
| Bärenfels Castle | | Duggingen | Ruins | | |
| Burg Castle (Burg im Leimental) | | Burg im Leimental; 47°27′25″N 7°26′26″E | hill castle | about 1250 | |
| Alt-Biederthal Castle | | Burg im Leimental | Ruins | | |
| Binningen Castle | | Binningen | | | |
| Hintere Birseck Castle | | Arlesheim | | | |
| Vordere Birseck Castle | | Arlesheim; 47°29′31″N 7°37′43″E | hill castle | 1243/44 | Partially ruined castle, outer castle well preserved |
| Mittlere Birseck Castle | | Arlesheim | | | |
| Bischofstein Castle | | Sissach; 47°28′28.72″N 7°49′37.32″E | Ruined hill castle | Mid 13th century | Extensive, preserved walls |
| Bottmingen Castle | | Bottmingen; 47°31′25″N 7°34′13″E | water castle | 13th century | |
| Ebenrain Castle | | Sissach; 47°27′51″N 7°48′18″E | Manor house | 1774-76 | |
| Engenstein Castle | | Pfeffingen | | | |
| Farnsburg Castle | | Ormalingen; 47°29′35.5″N 7°52′14.05″E | Ruined hill castle | Between 1319 and 1342 | Ruined castle |
| Frohberg Castle | | Aesch; 47°28′4.25″N 07°33′43.1″E | Ruined hill castle | Late 13th century | Ruined castle |
| Fürstenstein Castle | | Ettingen | Ruined castle | | |
| Gutenfels Castle | | Bubendorf | Ruined castle | | |
| Holeeschlösschen Castle | | Binningen | | | |
| Neu-Homburg Castle | | Läufelfingen; 47°24′10.5″N 7°51′18″E | hill castle | 1240 | Ruined castle residence of counts. |
| Madeln Castle | | Pratteln | Ruined castle | | |
| Münchenstein Castle | | Münchenstein; 47°30′45.22″N 07°37′17.1″E | Ruined hill castle | likely 1260 to 1275 | Ruined castle residence of Ministerialis. |
| Münchsberg Castle | | Pfeffingen | Ruined castle | | |
| Ödenburg Castle | | Wenslingen | Ruined castle | | |
| Pfeffingen Castle | | Pfeffingen; 47°27′12″N 7°35′29″E | Ruined hill castle | about 1135 | Ruined castle |
| Schloss Pratteln | | Pratteln | | | |
| Ränggen Castle | | Diegten | Ruined castle | | |
| Ramstein Castle | | Bretzwil | Ruined castle | | |
| Reichenstein Castle | | Arlesheim; 47°29′48.50″N 7°37′44.61″E | hill castle | 1239 (first mention) | |
| Riedfluh Castle | | Eptingen | Ruined castle | | |
| Schalberg Castle | | Pfeffingen | Ruined castle | | |
| Alt-Schauenburg Castle | | Frenkendorf; 47°29′44.0″N 7°40′23.7″E | Ruined hill castle, spur castle | 1275/1280 | |
| Neu-Schauenburg Castle | | Frenkendorf; 47°30′2.07″N 7°40′56.5″E | Ruined hill castle | 12th century (possible 11th century) | Destroyed in 1356 Basel earthquake, rebuilt then abandoned. 1480-1523 a cloistered house for Beguines lay sisters |
| Schönenberg Castle | | Burg im Leimental | Ruined castle | | |
| Sissacherfluh Castle | | Sissach; 47°28′49.55″N 7°49′4.05″E | Ruined refuge castle | | Ruined castle, first used in Bronze Age, again in Early Middle Ages and Thirty Years' War |
| Spitzburg Castle | | Ramlinsburg | Ruined castle | | |
| Fortified Church of St. Arbogast | | Muttenz; 47°31′20″N 7°38′44″E | Fortified church | 1100 | Only fortified church remaining in Switzerland. Still an active church |
| Waldenburg Castle | | Waldenburg | | | |
| Hintere Wartenberg Castle | | Muttenz | Ruined castle | | |
| Mittlere Wartenberg Castle | | Muttenz | Ruined castle | | |
| Vordere Wartenberg Castle | | Muttenz | Ruined castle | | |
| Wild-Eptingen Castle | | Eptingen | Ruined castle | | |
| Wildenstein Castle | | Bubendorf; 47°25′54″N 7°44′9″E | | about 1200 | Owned by the municipality |
| Zwingen Castle | | Zwingen | | | |

== Basel-Stadt ==
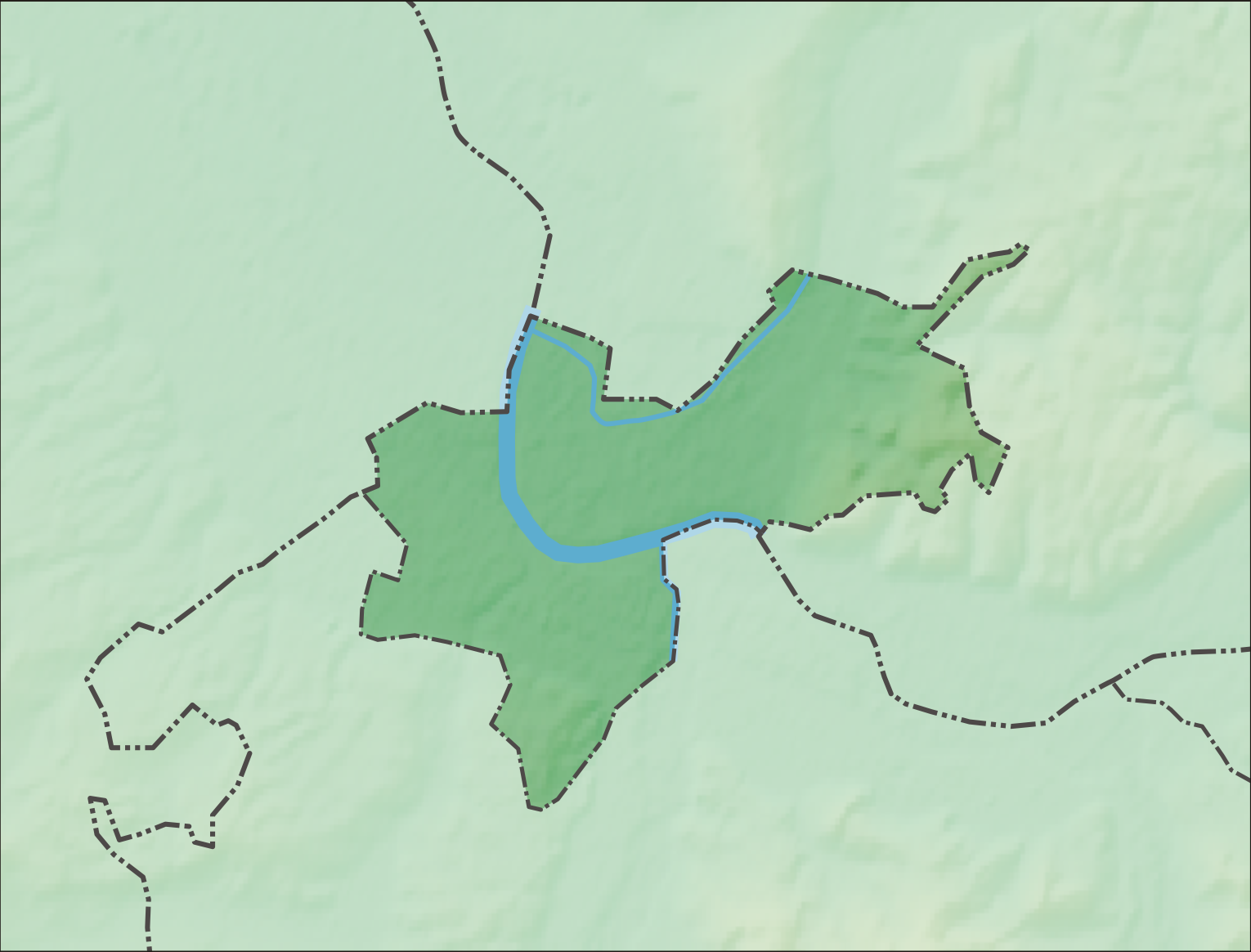
Castles in Basel Stadt

| Name | Image | Location | Type | Date | Notes |
|---|---|---|---|---|---|
| Gundeldingen Castle | | Basel; 47°32′24″N 7°35′32″E | Manor house | 14th century | Four castles of which parts remain of only two |

== Bern ==
Castles in the Canton of Bern
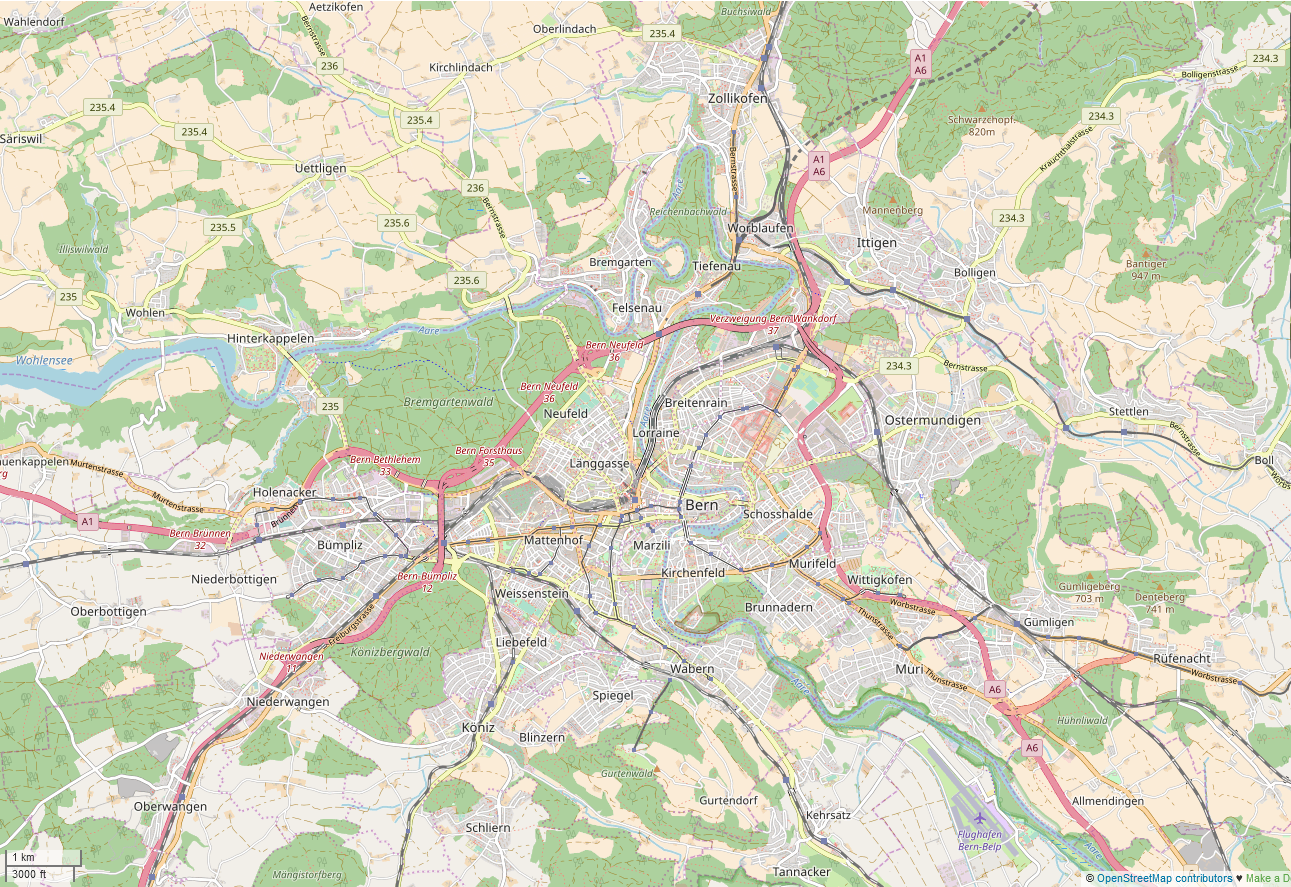
Castles near Bern city

| Name | Image | Location | Type | Date | Notes |
|---|---|---|---|---|---|
| Aarberg Castle | | Aarberg; 47°2′37.32″N 7°16′32.52″E | | 13th century | residence of ministeriales. |
| Aarwangen Castle | | Aarwangen; 47.245722°N 7.763425°E | | 1300 | built by the Walter von Aarwangen. Owned by the Canton of Bern, open to the public |
| Allmendingen Castle | | Allmendingen; 46°55′00″N 7°31′20″E | | Before 1239 | |
| Amsoldingen Castle | | Amsoldingen; 46.727182°N 7.578859°E | Castle | 10th century | Owned by the Canton of Bern, not open to the public |
| Aris ob Kien Castle | | Reichenbach im Kandertal; 46°36′31″N 7°41′44″E | | 12th century | |
| Belp Castle | | Belp; 46.892701°N 7.501996°E | | | |
| Bipp Castle | | Oberbipp; 47°15′49″N 7°39′08″E | Hill castle | by 1268 | residence of Ministerialis, Landvogt. |
| Blankenburg Castle | | Zweisimmen; 46.5397781°N 7.3867936°E | | c. 1329 | Owned by the Interessengemeinschaft Schloss Blankenburg, open to the public |
| Brandis Castle | | Lützelflüh; 47.012915°N 7.678318°E | Hill castle | 13th Century | Residence of Freiherren von Brandis. Owned by the Interessengemeinschaft Schloss Blankenburg, open to the public |
| Bremgarten Castle | | Bremgarten; 46.9776°N 7.4433°E | | 16th century | Owned by the Interessengemeinschaft Schloss Blankenburg, open to the public |
| Burgdorf Castle | | Burgdorf; 47.054763°N 7.629163°E | Castle | 1200 | built by the Berthold V, Duke of Zähringen. Owned by the Canton of Bern, open to the public |
| Altes Schloss Bümpliz | | Bümpliz; 46.94°N 7.39°E | | | Open to the public |
| Neues Schloss Bümpliz | | Bümpliz; 46°56′39″N 7°23′31″E | | | |
| Büren Castle | | Büren an der Aare; 47.140074°N 7.37142°E | | 1621-24 | Open to the public |
| Burgistein Castle | | Burgistein; 46.787203°N 7.505297°E | | 1260 | built by the Jordan I of Thun. Owned by the Canton of Bern, not open to the public |
| Erguel Castle | | Sonvilier; 47.13567°N 6.97708°E | | before 1264 | Owned by the Canton of Bern, not open to the public |
| Erlach Castle | | Erlach; 47.044537°N 7.094293°E | | 1090-1100 | built by the Burkart von Fenis. Owned by the Canton of Bern, not open to the public |
| Felsenburg | | Bern; 46°56′57.89″N 7°27′30.5″E | | 1260-1270 | Owned by the Canton of Bern, not open to the public |
| Felsenburg Castle | | Kandergrund; 46.531894°N 7.673257°E | | 12th century | built by the Freiherr of Kien, open to the public |
| Gampelen Castle | | Gampelen | | | |
| Grasburg Castle | | Schwarzenburg; 46.833823°N 7.331811°E | Castle Ruins | 11th-12th century | Owned by the Canton of Bern, open to the public |
| Grünenberg Castle | | Melchnau; 47.18°N 7.86°E | Ruined castle | 11th-12th century | Owned by the Stiftung Burgruine Grünenberg Melchnau, open to the public |
| Gümligen Castle | | Muri bei Bern; 46°56′05″N 7°30′55″E | Manor House | 1736 | Headquarters for Henri Guisan during WWII. |
| Hofgut Castle | | Muri bei Bern | | | |
| Habstetten Castle | | Bolligen | | | |
| Hindelbank Castle | | Hindelbank; 47°02′00″N 7°32′28″E | Castle | 1721-25 | Open to the public |
| Hofwil Castle | | Münchenbuchsee; 47°01′16″N 7°27′40″E | | 1784 | |
| Holligen Castle | | Bern; 46°56′37″N 7°25′07″E | Castle | around 1500 | Built by Wilhelm von Diesbach, not open to the public |
| Hünegg Castle | | Hilterfingen; 46.737794°N 7.654931°E | Manor house | 1861 | Built for Baron Albert Emil Otto von Parpart |
| Hünigen Castle | | Konolfingen; 46.872835°N 7.622867°E | | 1554 | Built by the Niklaus von Scharnachtal. Owned by the Parkhotel Schloss Hünigen, open to the public |
| Ittigen Castle | | Ittigen; 46.9750°N 7.4837°E | | 17th century | Rebuilt at end of 17th century by Samuel Jenner |
| Jegenstorf Castle | | Jegenstorf; 47.047829°N 7.509621°E | | 12th century | built by the Lords of Jegistorf, open to the public |
| Kehrsatz Castle | | Kehrsatz; 46°54′35″N 7°28′22″E | | late 16th century | Open to the public |
| Köniz Castle | | Köniz; 46°55′15″N 7°24′50″E | | 11th century | Built for Augustinian Canons |
| Landshut Castle | | Utzenstorf; 47.137361°N 7.548613°E | | 12th century | Built by the Dukes of Zähringen. Destroyed in Gümmenenkrieg (1332) and rebuilt. Owned by the Schweizer Museum für Wild und Jagd, open to the public |
| Laupen Castle | | Laupen; 46.902194°N 7.241723°E | | 10th-13th century | |
| Ligerz Castle | | Ligerz | | | |
| Lohn Estate | | Kehrsatz; 46°54′31″N 7°28′29″E | | 17th century | |
| Langenstein Castle | | Melchnau | | | |
| Upper Mannenberg Castle | | Zweisimmen; 46.5717°N 7.3820°E | Ruins | before 1190 | Owned by the Burg Mannenberg foundation, open to the public |
| Lower Mannenberg Castle | | Zweisimmen | | | |
| Villa Mettlen Castle | | Muri bei Bern | | | |
| Mülenen Castle | | Reichenbach im Kandertal; 46.63776°N 7.692°E | | 12th century | Built by the Freiherr of Kien, open to the public |
| Münchenwiler Castle | | Münchenwiler; 46.912157°N 7.126946°E | | 1100 | Owned by the Burg Mannenberg foundation, open to the public |
| Münsingen Castle | | Münsingen; 46.875454°N 7.560106°E | | 1550 | built by Hans Franz Nägeli. Now a museum |
| Muri Castle | | Muri bei Bern; 46.93106°N 7.48807°E | | 1650 | During French Revolution home of future King Charles X of France. Now privately owned |
| Nidau Castle | | Nidau; 47.12778°N 7.240195°E | | 13th century | Built by the Ulrich III or Rudolf I of Nidau. Owned by the Canton of Bern, open to the public |
| Oberdiessbach Castle | | Oberdiessbach; 46.838927°N 7.626079°E | Manor House | 1666-1668 | Open to the public |
| Oberhofen Castle | | Oberhofen am Thunersee; 46°43′47″N 7°40′07″E | water castle | 13th century | Residence of Freiherr, now Historical Museum of Bern, open to the public |
| Oberried Estate | | Belp; 46.888686°N 7.494615°E | Manor house | 1735-6 | |
| Ralligen Castle | | Sigriswil | | | |
| Reichenbach Castle | | Zollikofen; 46°59′26″N 7°26′57″E | | 14th century | Completely rebuilt in 1685 |
| Restiturm | | Meiringen; 46°43′36.49″N 8°11′46.39″E | Ruined tower | 13th century | |
| Riggisberg Castle | | Riggisberg; 46.5717°N 7.3820°E | | Before 13th century | Second castle built 1700 |
| Ringgenberg Castle | | Ringgenberg; 46.700988°N 7.897057°E | Ruins / Church | 12th century | Castle burned in 1381, church built in ruins in 1670 |
| Rümligen Castle | | Rümligen; 46.829282°N 7.48987°E | | Around 1076 | Privately owned, not open to the public |
| Schlossberg Castle | | La Neuveville; 47.0663°N 7.0844°E | | 1283-88 | Built by Prince-Bishop Henry von Isny. |
| Schlosswil Castle | | Schlosswil; 46.908139°N 7.608028°E | | 12th century | Burned down in 1546, soon rebuilt. Owned by the Steinmann Foundation, not open to the public |
| Spiez Castle | | Spiez; 46°41′20.95″N 7°41′14.56″E | | 933 | |
| Spittel Castle | | Sumiswald | | | |
| Schadau Castle | | Thun; 46.746111°N 7.637222°E | Manor house | 1846 | Home of the Swiss Gastronomy Museum |
| Schwarzenburg Castle | | Schwarzenburg; 46.815049°N 7.341401°E | | 1573-76 | Owned by the Schloss Schwarzenburg foundation, open to the public |
| Seeburg Castle | | Iseltwald | | | |
| Alt-Signau Castle | | Bowil; 46°54′15″N 7°43′22″E | Ruined hill castle | about 1130 | |
| Neu-Signau Castle | | Bowil; 46°54′34″N 7°42′34″E | Ruined hill castle, spur castle | 14th Century | Residence of Freiherren von Signau. No above ground ruins remain |
| Tellenburg Castle | | Frutigen; 46.575884°N 7.652103°E | Ruined castle | 1200 | Ruined castle built by the Lords of Kien. Owned by the Canton of Bern, open to the public |
| Thielle Castle | | Thielle | | | |
| Thorberg Castle | | Krauchthal; 47.0025°N 7.5643°E | Former monastery | 12th-13th century | Carthusian monastery until 1528, lunatic asylum 1805, prison since 1849 |
| Thun Castle | | Thun; 46°45′36.28″N 7°37′47.36″E | Keep | 12th century | Courthouse until 2009, museum since 1888 |
| Thunstetten Castle | | Thunstetten; 47.205406°N 7.753621°E | Manor house | 1711 | Owned by the Thunstetten Castle Foundation |
| Toffen Castle | | Toffen; 46.863447°N 7.489037°E | Castle | before 1306 | built by Johann von Bremgarten. Owned by the von May-von Werdt family, not open to the public |
| Trachselwald Castle | | Trachselwald; 47.017514°N 7.741878°E | Hill castle | 11th or 12th century | |
| Unterseen Castle | | Unterseen | | | |
| Unspunnen Castle | | Wilderswil; 46°40′07″N 7°51′26″E | Ruined castle | | |
| Wangen an der Aare Castle | | Wangen an der Aare; 47.236144°N 7.654504°E | | 13th century | |
| Wartenstein Castle | | Lauperswil; 46.9711°N 7.7325°E | Ruined castle | Before 1228 | Burned during Burgdorferkrieg, 1383, never rebuilt |
| Wiedlisbach Castle | | Wiedlisbach; 47°15′7.38″N 7°38′45.72″E | Tower house | 13th century | Built by the Count Ludwig the Elder von Frohburg. Rebelled during Swiss peasant war of 1653, captured and gate taken away by Bern |
| Weissenburg Castle | | Därstetten; 46°39′30″N 7°28′24″E | Ruined hill castle | 13th century | residence of Freiherr. |
| Wimmis Castle | | Wimmis; 46.672515°N 7.634414°E | Castle | 12th-13th century | built by the Lords of Wimmis/Strättligen. Owned by the Municipality of Wimmis, not open to the public |
| Wittigkofen Castle | | Bern; 46.942501°N 7.481927°E | | 13th century | |
| Worb Castle | | Worb; 46.931363°N 7.567573°E | | before 1130 | Built by the Freiherr de Worvo, not open to the public |

== Fribourg ==
Castles in Fribourg

| Name | Image | Location | Type | Date | Notes |
|---|---|---|---|---|---|
| Barberêche Castle | | Courtepin; 46°51′28″N 7°09′57″E | | 1522 | |
| Bulle Castle | | Bulle; 46°37′03″N 7°03′29″E | | 1273 | |
| Corbières Castle | | Corbières; 46°39′37″N 7°05′58″E | | | |
| Baillival Castle (Vuippens) | | Marsens; 46°39′30″N 7°04′41″E | | | |
| Baillival Castle (Surpierre) | | Surpierre; 46°44′42″N 6°51′50″E | | 13th century | |
| Bossonnens Castle | | Bossonnens; 46°31′14″N 6°50′54″E | | 12th century | Ruined castle |
| Castella Castle | | Delley-Portalban; 46°54′57″N 6°58′04″E | Manor house | | |
| Chenaux Castle | | Estavayer-le-Lac; 46°51′05″N 6°50′56″E | | 14th century | |
| De Diesbach Castle | | Torny; 46°46′20″N 6°57′57″E | Manor house | | |
| Griset de Forel Castle | | Torny; 46°46′06″N 6°56′48″E | Manor house | | |
| Gruyères Castle | | Gruyères; 46°35′05″N 7°05′02″E | Square castle | 1270-82 | |
| Illens Castle | | Rossens; 46°44′19″N 7°06′38″E | | 1150-1276 | Destroyed 1475 |
| Löwenberg Castle | | Murten; 46°56′20″N 7°08′16″E | Manor house | 15th-16th century | Partly used as classrooms for the SBB-CFF-FFS |
| Mézières Castle | | Mézières; 46°40′46″N 6°55′36″E | | | |
| Murten Castle | | Murten | | | |
| Poya Castle | | Fribourg; 46°48′50″N 7°09′34″E | Manor house | 1698 | |
| Romont Castle | | Romont; 46°41′40″N 6°55′07″E | Hill castle | before 1260 | |
| Rue Castle | | Rue; 46°37′12″N 6°49′21″E | | | |
| Saint-Germain Castle | | Gruyères; 46°35′03″N 7°04′57″E | | | Home of the H. R. Giger Museum |
| Vaulruz Castle | | Vaulruz | | | |
| Grand-Vivy Castle | | Courtepin; 46°52′16″N 7°10′36″E | | | Late Gothic castle built on site of an earlier castle |
| Petit-Vivy Castle | | Courtepin; 46°51′57″N 7°10′20″E | Keep | Late 13th century | |

== Geneva ==
Castles in Geneva

| Name | Image | Location | Type | Date | Notes |
|---|---|---|---|---|---|
| Bâtie-Beauregard | | Collex-Bossy; 46°17′28″N 6°07′11″E | Ruined hill castle | 1278 | |
| Bellerive Castle | | Collonge-Bellerive; 46°15′28″N 6°11′45″E | Château | | |
| Compesières Commandry | | Bardonnex; 46°09′07″N 6°07′14″E | Commandry | 1270 | Commandry of the Order of Malta, today owned by the municipality with a museum of the Order inside |
| Choully Castle | | Satigny; 46°13′23″N 6°01′47″E | Manor house | | |
| Dardagny Castle | | Dardagny; 46°11′39″N 5°59′43″E | | 13th century | Restored in 1926, 1932. Used as a school and government offices |
| Crest Castle | | Jussy; 46°14′10″N 6°15′24″E | | 1220 | Since 2005 maintained by the Foundation Micheli-du-Crest |
| Pregny Castle | | Pregny-Chambésy; 46°14′07″N 6°08′30″E | manor house | 1858 | Built for the banker Adolphe Carl de Rothschild, still privately owned by the family |
| Rouelbeau Castle | | Meinier; 46°14′31″N 6°13′04″E | Ruined castle | | |
| Merlinge Castle | | Gy | | | |
| Château de Tournay | | Pregny-Chambésy; 46°14′13″N 6°08′17″E | Manor House | | |
| Penthes Castle | | Pregny-Chambésy; 46°13′57″N 6°8′25″E | Manor House | | |
| Château de Versoix | | Versoix; 46°16′41.4″N 6°10′5.1″E | Manor House | | |

== Glarus ==
Castles in Glarus

| Name | Image | Location | Type | Date | Notes |
|---|---|---|---|---|---|
| Vorburg | | Glarus Nord; 47°07′05″N 9°03′26″E | | 13th century | Ruined castle |

== Grisons ==
Castles in Graubünden

| Name | Image | Location | Type | Date | Notes |
|---|---|---|---|---|---|
| Alt Aspermont Castle | | Trimmis; 46°54′48″N 9°34′20″E | hill castle | 12th century | |
| Neu-Aspermont Castle | | Jenins; 47.003243°N 9.565202°E | | c. 1235 | Ruined castle built by the Lords of Aspermont. Owned by the canton of Grisons, open to the public |
| Baldenstein Castle | | Sils im Domleschg; 46°42′23″N 9°27′37″E | hill castle | around 1246 | Castle owned by the canton of Grisons, open to the public |
| Belfort Castle | | Brienz/Brinzauls; 46.671151°N 9.610291°E | | 1222-31 | Ruined castle built by the Lords of Vaz. Owned by the canton of Grisons, open to the public |
| Belmont Castle | | Flims; 46°50′44″N 9°20′3″E | Höhenburg, Felslage | about 1000 | |
| Bernegg Castle | | Calfreisen, Arosa; 46°50′29″N 9°35′47.3″E | hill castle | about 1260 | Ruined castle. |
| Bishop's Castle or Unteres Schloss | | Fürstenau | | about 1270 | Current structure dates to the early 18th century, while the site has been occupied since the 13th. |
| Bothmar Castle | | Malans | | | |
| Brandis Castle or Maienfeld Castle | | Maienfeld; 47°00′23″N 9°31′51″E | Castle | 13th Century | |
| Cagliatscha Castle | | Andeer; 46°36′50″N 9°25′20″E | hill castle | around 1265 | |
| Campell Castle or Campi | | Sils im Domleschg; 46°42′1.6″N 9°28′17″E | hill castle | early 13th century | |
| Canaschal Castle | | Trin; 46.828056°N 9.365556°E | | | Ruined castle south-east of Trin. Sometimes called Hohentrins or combined with Sogn Parcazi |
| Castelberg Castle | | Ilanz/Glion; 46°45′24″N 9°12′35″E | hill castle | 13th century | Ruined castle |
| Castelmur Castle | | Bregaglia; 46.339828°N 9.5617°E | | 1723 | Palazzo built for Johannes Redolfi, today a museum |
| Castelmur Castle | | Bondo, Bregaglia; 46°20′28″N 9°33′38″E | hill castle | before 842 | |
| Castels Castle | | Luzein; 46°55′29″N 9°44′42″E | hill castle | 13th century | |
| Ehrenfels Castle | | Sils im Domleschg; 46°41′48″N 09°27′06″E | hill castle | early 13th century | |
| Falkenstein Castle | | Igis | | | |
| Torre Fiorenzana | | Grono; 46.25023°N 9.150185°E | | late 12th century | Privately owned |
| Fracstein Castle | | Seewis im Prättigau; 46°58′33″N 9°37′00″E | Cave castle | about 1200 | Ruined castle |
| Frauenberg Castle (Frundsberg) | | Ruschein | | | |
| Friedau Castle | | Zizers; 46°56′3.3″N 9°33′46″E | Lowland castle | about 1200 to 1300 | Ruined castle in the center of Zizers |
| Greifenstein Castle | | Filisur; 46°40′34″N 9°41′35.41″E | hill castle | 12th century | Ruined castle |
| Grottenstein Castle | | Haldenstein; 46°53′2″N 09°31′22″E | Cave castle | about 1180 | Ruined castle |
| Grüneck Castle | | Ilanz/Glion; 46°46′33.6″N 9°11′41.6″E | hill castle | around 1200 | Ruined castle |
| Guardaval Castle | | Madulain; 46°35′08″N 9°55′59.59″E | hill castle | 13th century | Ruined castle |
| Alt-Haldenstein Castle | | Haldenstein; 46.880556°N 9.523333°E | Rock castle | around 1100 to 1299 | Ruined castle |
| Haldenstein Castle | | Haldenstein | | | |
| Hasensprung Castle | | Pratval village, Domleschg; 46°43′53″N 9°26′38.3″E | hill castle | between 1200 and 1300 | Ruined castle |
| Heinzenberg Castle | | Präz village, Cazis; 46°44′23″N 9°24′31″E | hill castle | about 1200 | Ruined castle |
| Hochjuvalt Castle | | Rothenbrunnen; 46°46′40″N 9°25′15″E | hill castle | 12th century | Ruined castle |
| Hohenrätien Castle | | Sils im Domleschg; 46°41′31″N 9°26′41″E | hill castle | 11th century | Ruined castle |
| Innerjuvalt Castle | | Rothenbrunnen; 46°46′6″N 9°25′54″E | hill castle | around 1250 | Ruined castle |
| Jörgenberg Castle | | Waltensburg/Vuorz; 46°46′49″N 09°08′17″E | hill castle, spur castle | 765 | Ruined castle |
| Klingenhorn Castle | | Malans; 46°59′39″N 9°34′46.46″E | hill castle | 13th century | Ruined castle |
| Kropfenstein Castle | | Waltensburg/Vuorz; 46.769868°N 9.101305°E | | 13th century | Open to the public |
| Lichtenstein Castle | | Haldenstein; 46°53′4.2″N 09°31′35″E | hill castle | early 12th century | Ruined castle |
| Marmels Castle | | Marmorera; 46°30′24″N 9°37′18.25″E | Cave Castle | around 1100 | Ruined castle |
| Marschlins Castle | | Landquart; 46°57′16.36″N 09°35′4.14″E | water castle | 13th century | Privately owned. Used as the residence of the Bishop of Chur. |
| Mesocco Castle | | Mesocco; 46°22′48″N 9°13′57″E | Hill castle | Before 1219 | Ruined castle |
| Neuburg Castle | | Untervaz; 46°54′46″N 09°32′39″E | hill castle | about 1300 | Ruined castle |
| Nivagl Castle | | Vaz/Obervaz | | | |
| Norantola Castle | | Cama; 46°16′59.59″N 9°10′35″E | hill castle | 12th century | Ruined castle |
| Ortenstein Castle | | Domleschg; 46°45′35″N 9°26′07″E | hill castle | about 1250 | Privately owned |
| Pala Castle | | San Vittore; 46°14′23.35″N 9°06′19.27″E | hill castle | 12th century | Ruined castle |
| Parpan Castle | | Churwalden; 46°45′37.94″N 9°33′29.11″E | | | |
| Planta Tower | | Zuoz; 46°36′07.93″N 9°57′35.33″E | tower house | 13th century | Houses the archives of the Oberengadin Kreis |
| Rappenstein Castle | | Untervaz; 46°55′30″N 9°31′11″E | Cave castle | around 1250 | Ruined cave castle |
| Rhäzüns Castle | | Rhäzüns; 46°47′54.10″N 9°24′11.80″E | hill castle | 10th century | Home of the Barons of Rhäzüns |
| Reichenau Castle | | Reichenau | | | |
| Rietberg Castle | | Pratval village, Domleschg; 46°44′09″N 9°26′53″E | hill castle | early 13th century | Site of the murder of Pompeius Planta during the Bündner Wirren. |
| Riom Castle | | Surses; 46°36′33.33″N 9°35′03.61″E | motte-and-bailey castle | around 1226 | |
| Ober-Ruchenberg Castle | | Trimmis | | | |
| Salenegg Castle | | Maienfeld | | | |
| San Peder Castle | | Scuol; 46°48′58.01″N 10°19′58.38″E | hill castle | 12th-13th century | Ruined tower and church |
| Santa Maria in Calanca | | Santa Maria in Calanca; 46°15′44.50″N 09°08′44.84″E | hill castle | about 1300 | Ruined castle |
| Schauenstein Castle | | Fürstenau | | | |
| Schiedberg Castle | | Sagogn; 46°47′30″N 09°16′0″E | hill castle | about 1000 | Ruined castle |
| Schwarzenstein Castle | | Obersaxen Mundaun; 46°45′1.35″N 9°04′22″E | hill castle | about 1250 | Ruined castle, residence of ministeriales. |
| Serviezel Castle | | Valsot; 46°52′59″N 10°27′10″E | hill castle | 12th century | Ruined castle |
| Alt-Sins Castle or Alt-Süns Castle | | Paspels village, Domleschg; 46°44′58″N 9°26′21″E | hill castle | about 1200 | Ruined castle |
| Neu-Sins Castle or Neu-Süns Castle | | Paspels; 46°44′39″N 9°26′52″E | hill castle | between 1250 and 1300 | Ruined castle residence of ministeriales in service to the Vaz family. |
| Sogn Parcazi | | Trin; 46°49′45.628″N 09°21′2.444″E | hill castle | about 750 (?) | Ruined fortified church and castle |
| Solavers Castle | | Seewis; 46°59′00″N 9°38′39″E | hill castle | 11th century | Ruined castle |
| Spaniola Castle | | Pontresina; 46°29′21.46″N 9°54′35.50″E | hill castle | around 1200 | Ruined castle |
| Spliatsch Castle | | Sur village, Surses; 46°31′01″N 9°37′37″E | hill castle | around 1200 | Ruined castle |
| Splügen Castle | | Splügen; 46°33′24″N 9°20′04″E | motte-and-bailey castle | around 1275 | Ruined castle residence of free nobility. |
| Steinsberg Castle | | Ardez; 46°46′27.40″N 10°12′18″E | hill castle | 12th century | Ruined castle |
| Strahlegg Castle | | Fideris | | | |
| Strassberg Castle | | Churwalden; 46°48′22.70″N 09°32′01.80″E | hill castle | around 1200 | |
| Tagstein Castle | | Masein | | | |
| Tschanüff Castle | | Ramosch, Valsot; 46°49′58.50″N 10°22′32.22″E | hill castle | 12th century | Ruined castle. Residence of ministerialis knights in service to the Bishop of Chur. |
| Obertagstein Castle | | Thusis; 46°41′6″N 9°25′40″E | hill castle | about 1300 | Ruined castle |
| Tarasp Castle | | Scuol; 46°46′44″N 10°15′42″E | hill castle | 11th century | Privately owned |
| Wildenberg Castle (Falera) | | Falera | | | |
| Wildenberg Castle (Zernez) | | Zernez; 46°41′59.1″N 10°5′46.4″E | | 13th century | |
| Wynegg Castle | | Malans; 46°59′40″N 09°34′12″E | hill castle, spur castle | About 1200 | Ruined castle |
| Upper Castle Zizers | | Zizers | | | |
| Lower Castle Zizers | | Zizers | | | |

== Jura ==
Castles in Jura

| Name | Image | Location | Type | Date | Notes |
|---|---|---|---|---|---|
| Asuel Castle | | La Baroche; 47°23′57″N 7°12′36″E | Ruined castle | | |
| Löwenburg Castle | | Pleigne; 47°25′45″N 7°18′58″E | Ruined castle | 13th/14th century | |
| Mont-Terri Castle | | Cornol; 47°23′28″N 7°09′40″E | Ruins | 1st century BC / 13th century | A ruined medieval castle above a prehistoric hillfort |
| Montvoie Castle | | Clos du Doubs; 47°21′57″N 7°03′24″E | | | |
| Moutier Castle | | Moutier; 47°16′49″N 7°22′23″E | | | |
| Prince-Bishops' Castle | | Delémont; 47°21′50″N 7°20′34″E | Château | 18th century | |
| Porrentruy Castle | | Porrentruy; 47°25′10″N 7°04′21″E | | 13th century | Residence of the prince-bishops of Basel from 1527 until 1792, while they were in exile |

== Lucerne ==
Castles in Lucerne

| Name | Image | Location | Type | Date | Notes |
|---|---|---|---|---|---|
| Beromünster Castle | | Beromünster | | | |
| Buttisholz Castle | | Buttisholz; 47°06′54″N 8°05′49″E | | | |
| Götzental Castle | | Dierikon; 47°05′30″N 8°22′37″E | | | |
| Heidegg Castle | | Gelfingen village, Hitzkirch; 47°13′0.33″N 8°16′22.92″E | | 12th-13th century | residence of Home of Lords of Heidegg, then of Lucerne patricians, today museum. |
| Huwyl Burg | | Römerswil | | | Only appears on a 1665 map, ruins excavated in 1902 |
| Kastelen Tower Ruins | | Alberswil; 47°08′49″N 7°59′35″E | hill castle | 1252 | Ruined castle tower |
| Bailiff's Castle (Willisau) | | Willisau; 47°07′10″N 7°59′26″E | | | |
| Meggenhorn Castle | | Meggen; 47°02′07″N 8°21′22″E | Manor house | 1868 | Houses a Welte Philharmonic Organ, used for concerts and as a reception hall |
| Neuhabsburg Castle | | Meggen; 47°02′30″N 8°22′25″E | | 1244 | Destroyed in 1352. In 1871 a Gothic Revival castle built on site. Today privately owned |
| Nünegg Castle | | Hohenrain; 47°12′32″N 8°18′14″E | | | Ruined castle |
| Schauensee Castle | | Kriens; 47°01′38″N 8°16′52″E | | 13th century | |
| Wyher Castle | | Ettiswil; 47°8′31.3″N 8°1′25.6″E | Water castle | 1304 first mentioned | Museum since 1996 |

== Neuchâtel ==
Castles in Neuchâtel

| Name | Image | Location | Type | Date | Notes |
|---|---|---|---|---|---|
| Auvernier Castle | | Auvernier; 46°58′29″N 6°52′37″E | | | |
| Boudry Castle | | Boudry 46°56′58″N 6°50′04″E | | | Now a museum for wine-making and viticulture; also a tasting center for Neuchâtel wines. Hosts private events. |
| Colombier Castle | | Colombier; 46°57′58″N 6°51′47″E | | 11th century | Built atop Roman ruins, today an infantry training center |
| Gorgier Castle | | Gorgier; 46°54′30″N 6°47′09″E | | | Privately owned. Not open to the public. |
| Ivernois Castle | | Val-de-Travers; 46°54′38″N 6°36′43″E | Château | | |
| Jeanjaquet Castle | | Cressier; 47°02′55″N 7°01′34″E | | | |
| Monts Castle | | Le Locle; 47°03′49″N 6°45′00″E | Château | | Now a museum for watchmaking. |
| Neuchâtel Castle | | Neuchâtel; 46°59′32″N 6°55′37″E | | | Seat of the Canton's government; also seat of the Canton's Grand Conseil (legislative assembly). |
| Souaillon Castle | | Cornaux; 47°01′28″N 7°00′20″E | | | |
| Valangin Castle | | Valangin; 47°00′53″N 6°54′24″E | | | Now a museum. |
| Vaumarcus Castle | | Vaumarcus | | | |

== Nidwalden ==
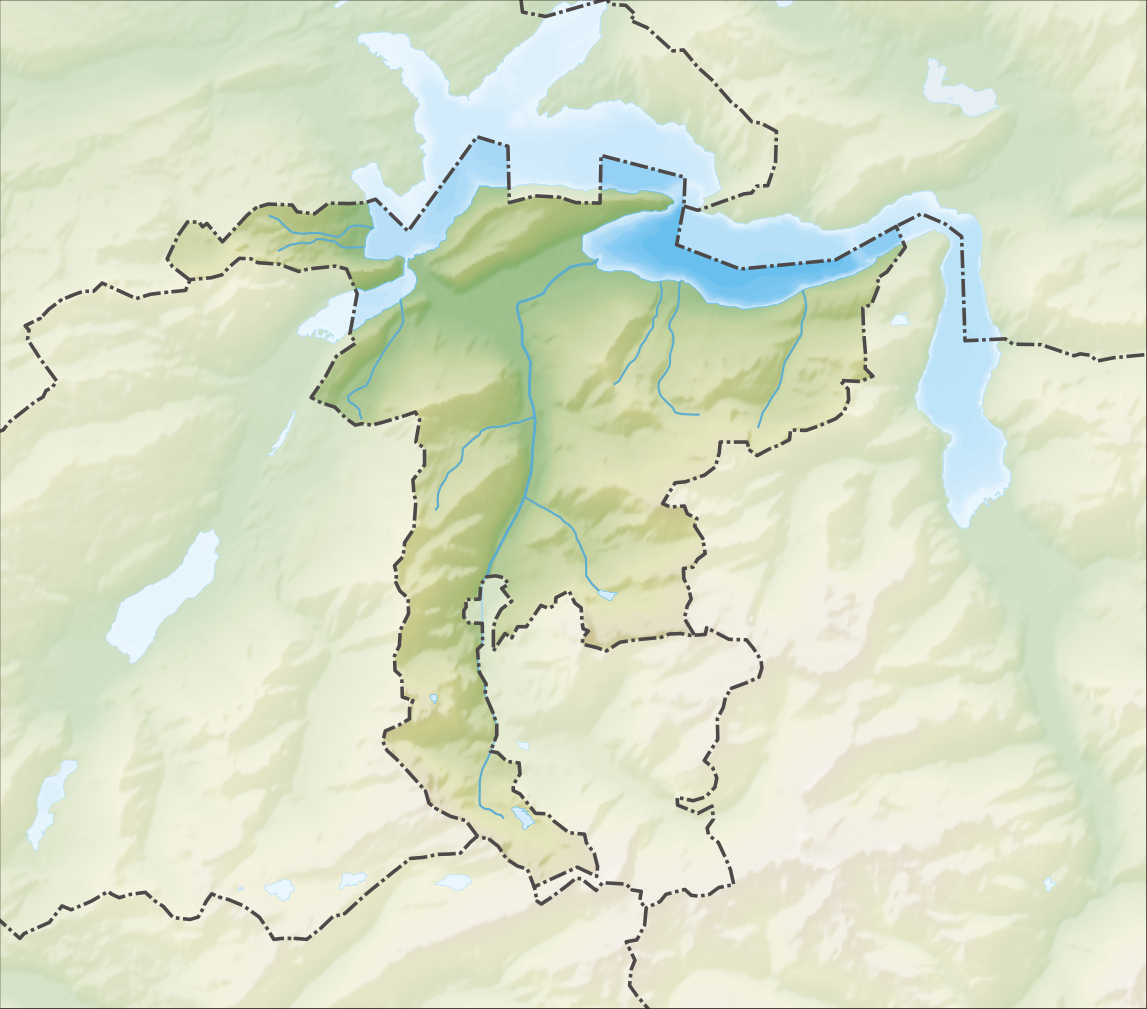
Castles in Nidwalden

| Name | Image | Location | Type | Date | Notes |
|---|---|---|---|---|---|
| Rotzberg Castle | | Rotzberg by Ennetmoos; 46°57′51″N 8°20′11″E | hill castle, spur castle | 10th-12th century | Ruined castle |
| Schnitzturm | | Stansstad; 46.980929°N 8.337663°E | square tower | 1206/07 | |

== Obwalden ==
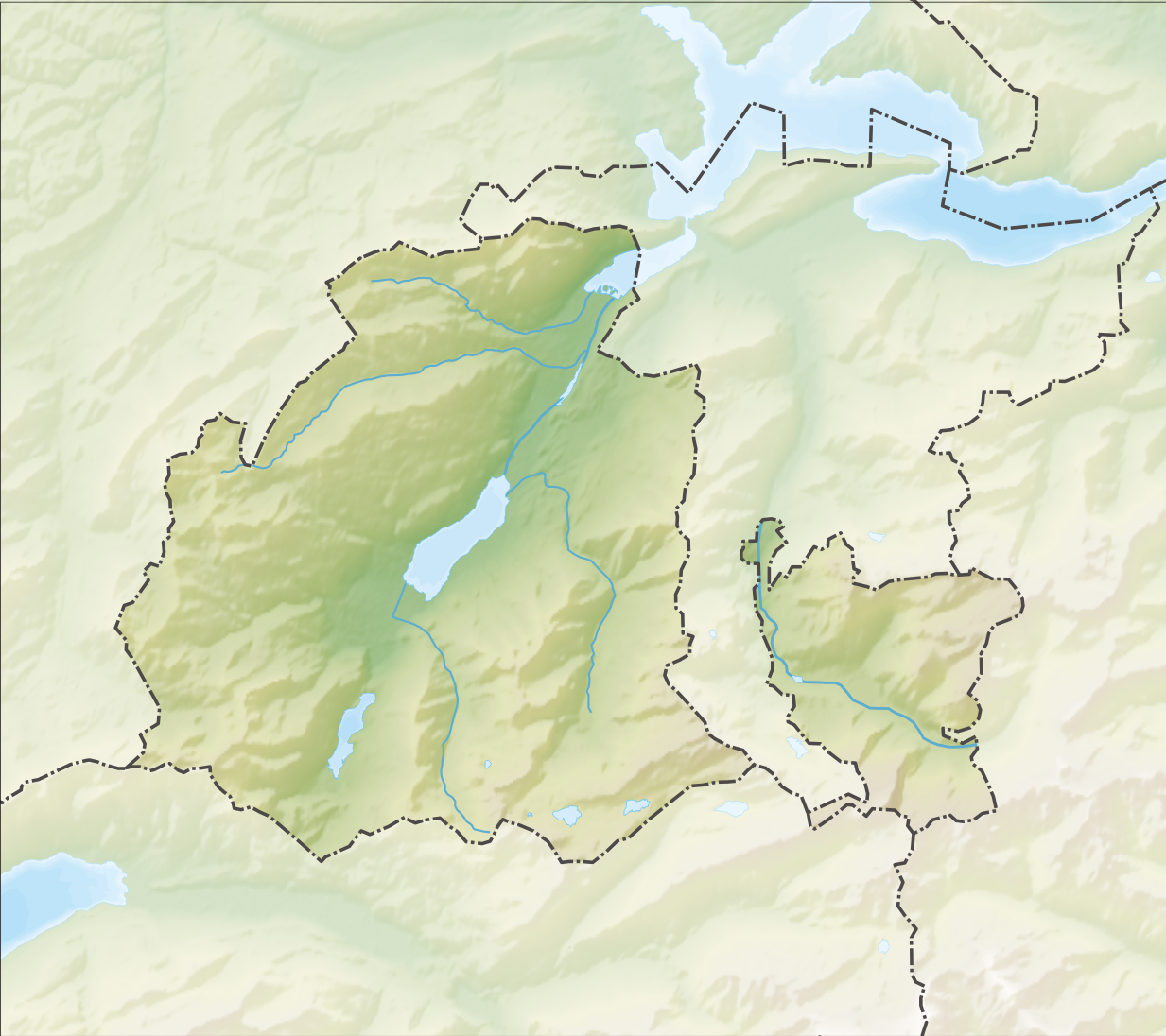
Castles in Obwalden

| Name | Image | Location | Type | Date | Notes |
|---|---|---|---|---|---|
| Hexenturm | | Sarnen; 46.895683°N 8.243706°E | | 1285/86 | built by the Niklaus and Heinrich Kellner. |
| Landenberg Castle | | Sarnen; 46°53′48.16″N 8°14′37.94″E | | 11th century | Ruined castle, 18th century armory and firing range built on site |
| Rosenberg Castle | | Giswil-Kleinteil; 46°49′55.4″N 8°9′19.82″E | | 13th century | Ruined bailiff's castle. |
| Rudenz Castle | | Giswil-Rudenz; 46°49′57″N 8°11′04″E | hill castle, spur castle | 1200 to 1250 | Ruined castle, residence of ministeriales family. |

== Schaffhausen ==
Castles in Schaffhausen

| Name | Image | Location | Type | Date | Notes |
|---|---|---|---|---|---|
| Herblingen Castle | | Stetten; 47°44′01″N 8°39′40″E | spur castle | 13th century | privately owned. |
| Hohenklingen Castle | | Stein am Rhein; 47°40′0″N 8°51′30″E | hill castle, spur castle | 1225 | residence of Freiherren. |
| Munot | | Schaffhausen; 47°41′49″N 8°38′23″E | | 1563–1585 | City fortifications |
| Wörth Castle | | Neuhausen am Rheinfall; 47.676838°N 8.61363°E | water castle | | Built on a river island at the Rheinfalls |
| Radegg Castle | | 47°39′06″N 8°30′24″E | hill castle, spur castle | 13th Century | Ruined castle residence of Freiherren von Radegg, destroyed around 1300. |

== Schwyz ==
Castles in Schwyz

| Name | Image | Location | Type | Date | Notes |
|---|---|---|---|---|---|
| Alt Rapperswil Castle | | Altendorf; 47.184953°N 8.841181°E | Ruins | before 1200 | |
| Schwanau Castle | | Lauerz; 47.032476°N 8.597395°E | Ruins | about 12th century | |
| Gesslerburg | | Küssnacht; 47°04′55″N 8°26′55″E | hill castle | about 9th century | Ruined castle |
| Grynau Castle | | Tuggen; 47.216324°N 8.970278°E | | early 13th century | Today a country inn |
| Pfäffikon Castle | | Freienbach; 47°12′18″N 8°46′25″E | water castle | 13th century | Built by Einsiedeln Abbey as an abbot's residence |

== Solothurn ==
Castles in Solothurn

| Name | Image | Location | Type | Date | Notes |
|---|---|---|---|---|---|
| Balm Castle ruins | | Balm bei Günsberg; 47°15′20″N 7°33′18″E | Cave castle | 11th century | Ruined castle |
| Alt-Bechburg Castle | | Holderbank; 47°19′56″N 7°46′18″E | hill castle | c. 1000-1100 | Ruined castle residence of counts. |
| Neu-Bechburg Castle | | Oensingen; 47°17′50″N 7°43′07″E | hill castle | c. 1250 | residence of Freiherr. |
| Blauenstein | | Kleinlützel; 47°25′53″N 7°24′58″E | Ruined Hill Castle | 13th century | |
| Blumenstein Castle | | Solothurn; 47°12′59″N 7°32′13″E | Régence style house | 1725-28 | Today houses Historical Museum of Solothurn |
| Buchegg Castle | | Kyburg-Buchegg; 47°08′29″N 7°30′34″E | | 1546 | |
| Dorneck Castle | | Dornach; 47°28′47.97″N 07°37′41.05″E | Ruined hill castle | c. 1050 | |
| Alt-Falkenstein Castle | | Balsthal | | | |
| Neu-Falkenstein Castle | | Balsthal; 47°19′22″N 7°42′36″E | Ruined hill castle | c. 1100 | |
| Frohburg Castle | | Trimbach; 47°22′45″N 7°53′24″E | hill castle | c. 800 | Ruined castle, residence of counts. |
| Gilgenberg Castle | | Zullwil | | | |
| Rotberg Castle | | Metzerlen-Mariastein; 47°27′54″N 7°29′04″E | | | |
| Steinbrugg Castle | | Solothurn; 47°12′44″N 7°32′48″E | Manor house | | |
| Sternenberg Castle | | Hofstetten | | | |
| Neu-Thierstein Castle | | Büsserach; 47°23′06″N 7°32′18″E | spur castle | c. 1180/1190 | Ruined castle |
| Waldegg Castle | | Feldbrunnen-St.Niklaus; 47°13′24″N 7°32′54″E | | 1682-86 | |

== St. Gallen ==
Castles in St. Gallen

| Name | Image | Location | Type | Date | Notes |
|---|---|---|---|---|---|
| Blatten Castle | | Oberriet | | | |
| Bucholz Castle | | Berneck | | 15th century | |
| Dottenwil Castle | | Wittenbach | | | |
| Freudenberg Castle | | Bad Ragaz; 47°0′32″N 9°29′33″E | Ruined hill castle | about 1200-1250 | |
| Frischenberg Castle | | Sennwald; 47°13′54″N 9°26′57″E | Ruined hill castle | after 1313 | Ruined castle |
| Forstegg Castle | | Sennwald; 47°14′44″N 9°29′45″E | Ruined hill castle | about 1200 | Residence of Freiherr of Sax/Misox. |
| Fründsberg Castle | | Goldingen; 47°17′01″N 8°56′29″E | Ruined castle | | |
| Gräpplang Castle | | Flums-Gräpplang; 47°06′10″N 09°19′56″E | hill castle, spur castle | about 1100-1200 | Ruined castle |
| Grünenstein Castle | | Balgach | | | |
| Kleiner Hahnberg Castle | | Berg; 47°29′41″N 9°24′57″E | | | |
| Heerbrugg Castle | | Balgach | | | |
| Hohensax Castle | | Sennwald; 47°13′49″N 9°26′37″E | Ruined hill castle | 1200 | |
| Iberg Castle | | Wattwil; 47°17′51″N 09°04′48″E | hill castle | 1200 | Owned by the municipality |
| Oberberg Castle | | Gossau | | | |
| Ramschwag Ruins | | Häggenschwil; 47.4899°N 9.3223°E | Ruined castle | around 1200 | |
| Rapperswil Castle | | Rapperswil; 47.227337°N 8.815509°E | water castle | 1220 | Home of the Polish Museum, Rapperswil |
| Rosenberg Castle | | Berneck | ruined castle | 13th century | |
| Sargans Castle | | Sargans; 47°03′01″N 9°26′14″E | hill castle | 12th century | Today a museum |
| Wartau Castle | | Wartau; 47°05′55.44″N 9°29′26.24″E | ruined hill castle | about 1225 | Ruined castle residence of Freiadelige. |
| Wartegg Castle | | Rorschacherberg | | | |
| Wartensee Castle | | Rorschacherberg | | | |
| Wartenstein Castle | | Pfäfers; 46°59′39.30″N 9°30′37.94″E | ruined hill castle | about 1206 | Ruined castle |
| Werdenberg Castle | | Grabs; 47°10′07″N 9°27′42″E | hill castle | 1228 | residence of counts of Werdenberg. |
| Wichenstein Castle | | Oberriet; 47°19′38″N 9°33′14″E | ruined cave castle | | |
| Zuckenriet Castle | | Niederhelfenschwil; 47°29′19″N 9°09′49″E | | | |

== Ticino ==
Castles in Ticino

| Name | Image | Location | Type | Date | Notes |
|---|---|---|---|---|---|
| Castelgrande | | Bellinzona; 46°11′34″N 9°01′20″E | Hill castle | 13th century | Part of UNESCO World Heritage Site |
| Montebello | | Bellinzona; 46°11′29″N 9°01′36″E | Hill castle | 1313 | Part of UNESCO World Heritage Site, Houses a museum |
| Sasso Corbaro | | Bellinzona; 46°11′17″N 9°01′49″E | Hill castle | 1478 | Part of UNESCO World Heritage Site, Houses a museum |
| S. Giorgio Castle | | Magliaso; 45°59′13″N 8°53′19″E | | 1033 | |
| Pontegana Castle | | Balerna; 45°50′35″N 9°00′57″E | Ruined hill castle | 10th century | Castle ruins |
| Serravalle Castle | | Serravalle; 46°24′46.10″N 8°58′20.8″E | Ruined hill castle | 12th century | Ruined castle |
| Stalvedro Castle | | Airolo | | | |
| Visconteo Castle | | Locarno; 46.1679°N 8.7933°E | | 12th or 13th century | Open to the public, houses a museum |

== Thurgau ==
Castles in Thurgau

| Name | Image | Location | Type | Date | Notes |
|---|---|---|---|---|---|
| Altenburg Castle | | Märstetten | | | |
| Altenklingen Castle | | Wigoltingen; 47°36′08″N 9°04′41″E | | | Privately owned |
| Arbon Castle | | Arbon; 47.515662°N 9.436979°E | | 13th century | Historisches Museum Arbon, open to the public |
| Arenenberg | | Salenstein; 47°40′22″N 9°03′33″E | Chateau | 16th century | Houses the Napoleon Museum |
| Bachtobel Castle | | Weinfelden; 47°34′56″N 9°05′24″E | chateau | | |
| Bernegg Castle | | Kreuzlingen; 47°38′39″N 9°09′32″E | | about 1292 | |
| Alt-Bichelsee Castle | | Bichelsee-Balterswil; 47°26′50″N 8°55′03″E | hill castle | about 1250 | Ruined castle |
| Bildegg Castle | | Zihlschlacht-Sitterdorf; 47°30′13″N 9°17′44″E | | | |
| Bischofszell Castle | | Bischofszell | | | |
| Bettwiesen Castle | | Bettwiesen; 47°29′46″N 9°01′47″E | | | |
| Brunegg Castle | | Kreuzlingen | | | |
| Buhwil Castle | | Kradolf-Schönenberg | | | |
| Bürglen Castle | | Bürglen | | | |
| Castell Castle | | Tägerwilen; 47°38′44″N 9°07′59″E | Mansion | 1585 | |
| Eugensberg Castle | | Salenstein; 47°40′01″N 9°02′36″E | Manor house | | |
| Frauenfeld Castle | | Frauenfeld; 47°33′19″N 8°53′49″E | | | |
| Freudenfels Castle | | Eschenz; 47°38′20″N 8°53′24″E | | | |
| Alt-Gachnang Castle | | Gachnang | | | |
| Neu-Gachnang Castle | | Gachnang | | | |
| Girsberg Castle | | Kreuzlingen | | | |
| Gottlieben Castle | | Gottlieben; 47.664027°N 9.136021°E | | 1251 | Privately owned |
| Hagenwil Castle | | Hagenwil, Amriswil; 47°31′45″N 9°18′19″E | water castle | 1264 | |
| Hauptwil Castle | | Hauptwil-Gottshaus; 47°28′50″N 9°15′06″E | | | |
| Heitnau Castle | | Braunau | | | |
| Heuberg Castle | | Bischofszell | Ruined castle | | |
| Hubberg Castle | | Salenstein | | | |
| Hüttlingen Castle | | Hüttlingen | | | |
| Kefikon Castle | | Gachnang | | | |
| Klingenberg Castle | | Homburg | | | |
| Liebenfels Castle | | Herdern; 47°37′53″N 8°55′33″E | | | |
| Louisenberg Castle | | Salenstein; 47°40′19″N 9°02′55″E | | | |
| Mammern Castle | | Mammern; 47°38′48″N 8°55′04″E | | | |
| Mammertshofen Castle | | Roggwil; 47°29′41″N 9°23′53″E | | | |
| Neuburg | | Mammern | | | |
| Öttlishausen Castle | | Hohentannen | | | |
| Roggwil Castle | | Roggwil | | | |
| Sandegg Castle | | Salenstein | | | |
| Schleifenrain Castle | | Hugelshofen | | | |
| Seeburg Castle | | Kreuzlingen; 47°38′58″N 9°11′12″E | | | |
| Salenstein Castle | | Salenstein | | | |
| Sonnenberg Castle | | Stettfurt; 47°31′41″N 8°57′43″E | | | |
| Steinegg Castle | | Hüttwilen | | | |
| Tannegg Castle | | Fischingen; 47°25′50″N 8°57′02″E | | | |
| Unterhof Castle | | Diessenhofen; 47°41′24″N 8°44′52″E | | | |
| Weinfelden Castle | | Weinfelden | | | |
| Wellenberg Castle | | Felben-Wellhausen | | | |

== Uri ==
Castles in Uri

| Name | Image | Location | Type | Date | Notes |
|---|---|---|---|---|---|
| Apro Castle | | Seedorf; 46°53′12″N 8°36′23″E | Rural mansion | 1555 | |
| Rudenz Castle | | Flüelen; 46°54′07″N 8°37′30″E | | Early 13th century | Owned by the municipality, used for events |
| Attinghausen Castle | | Attinghausen; 46°51′44″N 8°37′47″E | | about 1100 | Ruined castle |
| Hospental Castle | | Hospental; 46°37′07″N 8°34′00″E | spur castle | 13th century | Ruined castle, partially preserved |
| Meierturm | | Silenen; 46°46′45″N 8°40′20″E | | | |
| Schweinsberg Castle | | Attinghausen, Uri; 46°51′51″N 8°37′34″E | | 13th century | built by the Knights of Schweinsberg. |
| Seedorf Castle | | Seedorf; 46°53′08″N 8°36′23″E | | | Ruined castle |
| Silenen Castle | | Silenen | | | |
| Zwing Uri Castle | | Silenen; 46°46′28″N 8°40′14″E | | 13th century | Possibly destroyed in 1307 during the Burgenbruch, during founding of Swiss Confederation |

== Vaud ==
Castles in Vaud

| Name | Image | Location | Type | Date | Notes |
|---|---|---|---|---|---|
| Aigle Castle | | Aigle; 46°18′54″N 6°58′34″E | hill castle | 11th century | Now the Vineyard and Wine museum |
| Aile Castle | | Vevey; 46°27′33″N 6°50′27″E | | | |
| Allaman Castle | | Allaman; 46.4713°N 6.3978°E | | 1253 | Privately owned |
| Aubonne Castle | | Aubonne; 46°29′48″N 6°23′29″E | | 11th century | |
| Avenches Castle | | Avenches; 46°52′53″N 7°02′28″E | | 1175 | Built as the residence of Évêque de Lausanne. Owned by the Avenches municipality |
| Beaulieu Castle | | Lausanne; 46°31′38″N 6°37′30″E | Château | | built by the Rodolphe de Crousaz. |
| Blonay Castle | | Blonay; 46°28′10″N 6°53′24″E | | 1175 | |
| Bossey Castle | | Bogis-Bossey | | | |
| Champittet Castle | | Cheseaux | | | |
| Champvent Castle | | Champvent; 46°46′44″N 6°34′16″E | | 1250 | residence of Ebal IV de Grandson. |
| Châtelard Castle | | Montreux; 46°26′51″N 6°53′58″E | | | |
| Chillon Castle | | Veytaux; 46.414167°N 6.9275°E | Water castle | 1005 | Open to the public |
| Les Clées Castle | | Les Clées; 46°43′51″N 6°27′46″E | Castle | | |
| Coppet Castle | | Coppet; 46°18′57″N 6°11′35″E | Château | 14th century | |
| Crans Castle | | Crans-près-Céligny; 46°21′28″N 6°12′32″E | | 1764 | built by the Jean-Louis Bovet. Owned by the Crans municipality |
| Crêtes Castle | | Montreux; 46°26′43″N 6°53′27″E | | | residence of Vincent Dubochet. |
| Curtilles Castle | | Curtilles; 46°41′54″N 6°50′54″E | | 1584 | built by the François de Villarzel. |
| Donneloye Castle | | Donneloye; 46°44′42″N 6°42′58″E | | 14th century | privately owned |
| Duillier Castle | | Duillier; 46°24′25″N 6°14′03″E | | | |
| Dully Castle | | Dully; 46°25′46″N 6°17′42″E | | | |
| D'En-Bas Castle | | Mex; 46°34′37″N 6°33′05″E | | 1403 | |
| Echandens Castle | Echandens | | | | |
| Glérolles Castle | | Saint-Saphorin; 46°28′28″N 6°47′13″E | | | |
| Grandcour Castle | | Grandcour; 46°52′25″N 6°55′48″E | Château | | residence of Abraham de Sinner. |
| Grandson Castle | | Grandson; 46°48′32″N 6°38′46″E | | 1050-1100 | |
| Guévaux Castle | | Vully-les-Lacs; 46°56′17″N 7°03′23″E | Château | | |
| Hauteville Castle | | Saint-Légier-La Chiésaz; 46°28′01″N 6°52′06″E | Château | 1760s | |
| L'Isle Castle | | L'Isle; 46°37′09″N 6°24′42″E | Chateau | 1694 | built by Jules Hardouin-Mansart. residence of Charles de Chandieu. Owned by L'Isle municipality |
| Lucens Castle | | Lucens; 46°42′36″N 6°50′19″E | Medieval Tower house | 13th century | Built as a residence for the Bishop of Lausanne |
| Luins Castle | | Luins; 46°26′40″N 6°16′18″E | | 14th century | residence of de Cossonay family. Owned by the Baechtold family |
| Lutry Castle | | Lutry; 46°30′11″N 6°41′13″E | | 16th century | residence of Family of the Mayor of Lutry. Owned by the Lutry municipality |
| Château Saint-Maire | | Lausanne; 46°31′30″N 6°38′09″E | | 1397 - 1406 | Seat of the cantonal government |
| Mathod Castle | | Mathod; 46°45′57″N 6°33′58″E | | 16th century | |
| Mestral Castle | | Échichens; 46°32′43.14″N 6°29′14.80″E | | 17th century | |
| Morges Castle | | Morges; 46°30′24″N 6°29′48″E | Castle | 13th century | Home to the Vaud Military Museum |
| Nyon Castle | | Nyon; 46°22′56″N 6°14′26″E | | 13th century | |
| Orbe Castle | | Orbe; 46°43′27″N 6°31′54″E | | | |
| Oron Castle | | Oron; 46°34′28″N 6°50′14″E | Castle | 13th century | |
| Pampigny Castle | | Hautemorges; 46°34′52″N 6°25′44″E | Castle | 13th century | Used as a school by the Pampigny municipality |
| Prangins Castle | | Prangins; 46°23′39″N 6°15′07″E | | | Owned by the Swiss federal government, part of the Swiss National Museum |
| Rolle Castle | | Rolle; 46°27′31″N 6°20′28″E | Castle | 1264 | Owned by the Rolle municipality |
| Saint-Prex Castle | | Saint-Prex | | | |
| La Sarraz Castle | | La Sarraz; 46°39′37″N 6°30′51″E | Castle | 11th century | residence of La Sarraz family. Owned by the Fondation du Château de La Sarraz |
| La Tour de Peilz Castle | | La Tour-de-Peilz | | | |
| Vincy Castle | | Gilly; 46°27′43″N 6°18′04″E | Mansion | 1721 | residence of Jean and David de Vasserot. |
| Vufflens Castle | | Vufflens-le-Château; 46°31′29″N 6°28′35″E | | 1425 | residence of Henri de Colombier. Owned by the Famille de Saussure |
| Vullierens Castle | | Vullierens; 46°34′16″N 6°28′48″E | | | |
| Yverdon Castle | | Yverdon-les-Bains; 46°46′42″N 6°38′30″E | Castle | 13th century | built by the Jacques de Saint-Georges. Home of the Yverdon regional museum. |

== Valais ==
Castles in Valais

| Name | Image | Location | Type | Date | Notes |
|---|---|---|---|---|---|
| La Bâtiaz Castle | | Martigny; 46°06′18″N 7°04′09″E | hill castle | about 1232 | Ruined castle |
| Beauregard Castle | | Chippis; 46°16′41″N 7°33′08″E | rock castle | between 1000 and 1100 | Ruined castle |
| Chalais Castle | | Chalais; 46°16′01″N 7°30′33″E | hill castle | 13th century | Ruined castle |
| Fairy Rock | | Crans-Montana; 46°19′33″N 7°31′13″E | rock castle | about 1190 | Ruin |
| Gestelnburg | | Niedergesteln; 46°18′49″N 7°46′59″E | rock castle | | |
| Leuk Castle | | Leuk; 46°18′58″N 7°38′02″E | | | |
| Majorie Castle | | Sion; 46°14′04″N 7°21′43″E | | | Ruined castle |
| Montorge Castle | | Sion; 46°13′50″N 7°20′05″E | | | Ruined castle |
| Saillon Castle | | Saillon; 46°10′14″N 7°10′58″E | hill castle | 1259-62 | Ruined castle |
| Saxon Castle | | Saxon; 46°08′35″N 7°10′39″E | hill castle | 1259 | Ruined castle |
| Saint-Maurice Castle | | Saint-Maurice; 46°13′24″N 7°00′11″E | | | |
| Soie Castle | | Savièse; 46°14′36″N 7°19′31″E | | 1200 | Destroyed in the Raron affair (1417) |
| Stockalper Palace | | Brig-Glis; 46.315265°N 7.990656°E | | 1658-78 | |
| Tourbillon Castle | | Sion; 46.236455°N 7.366948°E | hill castle | 1290-1308 | Built by the Boniface de Challant. Owned by the City of Sion, open to the public |
| Valère Basilica | | Sion; 46°14′01.7″N 7°21′51.7″E | fortified church | 1200-1300 | Active church, minor basilica since 1984 |
| Venthône Castle | | Noble-Contrée; 46.3075°N 7.5320°E | Tower | 13th century | |
| Zen-Ruffinen Castle | | Leuk; 46°19′01″N 7°38′08″E | | 1611-12, 19th century | Complex built in several stages |

== Zug ==
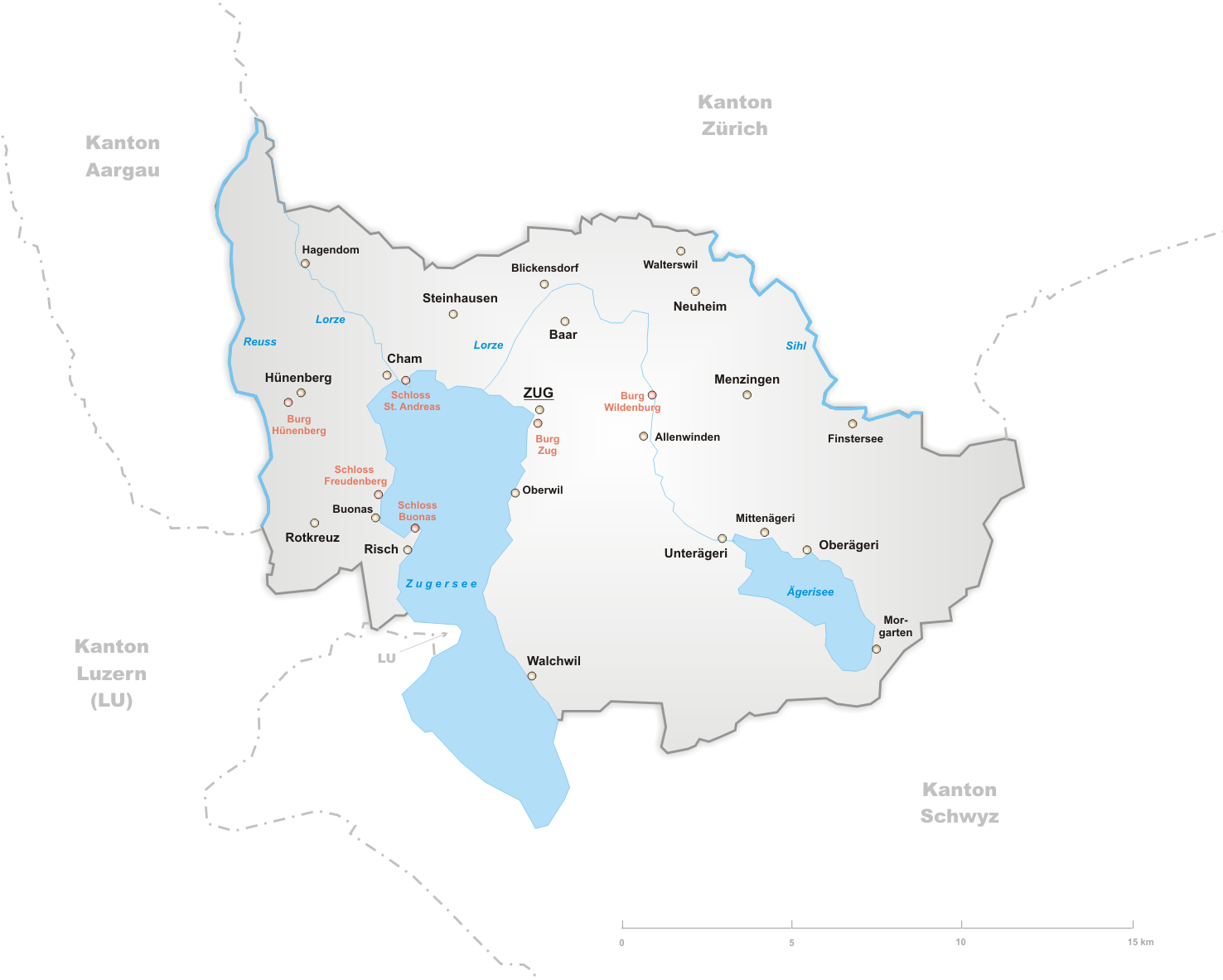
Castles in Zug

1. Buonas Castle, Risch
2. Freudenberg Castle, Risch-Rotkreuz
3. Hünenberg Castle, Hünenberg
4. St. Andreas Castle, Cham
5. Wildenburg Castle (Zug), Baar
6. Zug Castle, Zug

== Zürich ==
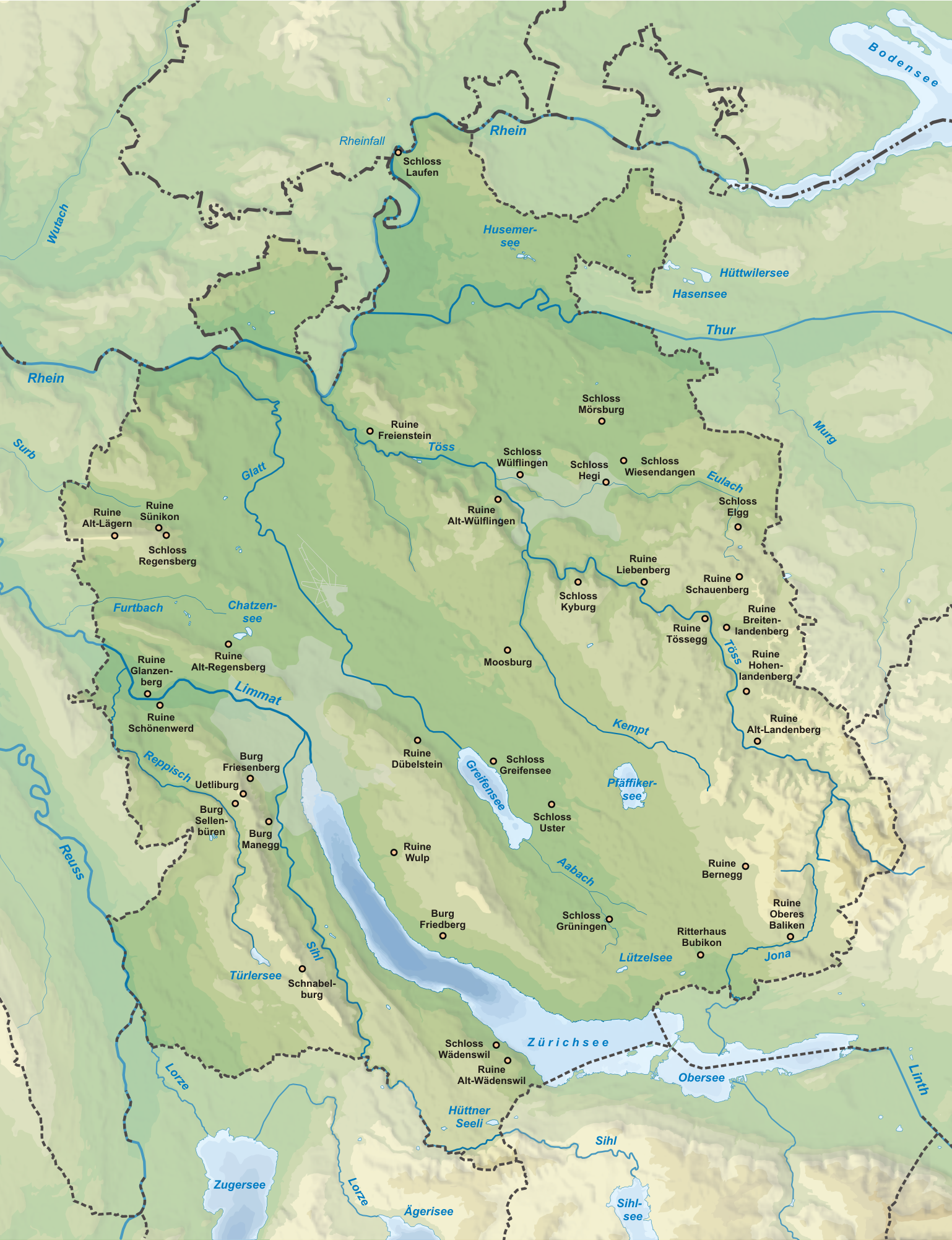
Castles in Zürich

1. Au Castle, Wädenswil
2. Ruins of Baldern Castle, Stallikon
3. Ruins of Oberes Baliken Castle, Wald
4. Ruins of Bernegg Castle, Hinwil
5. Ruins of Alt-Bichelsee Castle, Bichelsee
6. Ruins of Breitenlandenberg Castle, Turbenthal
7. Bubikon Castle, Bubikon
8. Ruins of Dübelstein Castle, Dübendorf
9. Eglisau Castle, Eglisau
10. Elgg Castle, Elgg
11. Flaach Castle, Flaach
12. Ruins of Freienstein Castle, Freienstein - Teufen
13. Ruins of Friedberg Castle, Meilen
14. Ruins of Friesenberg Castle, Friesenberg, Zürich
15. Girsberg Castle, Girsberg
16. Ruins of Glanzenberg Castle, Unterengstringen
17. Greifenberg Castle, Bäretswil
18. Greifensee Castle, Greifensee
19. Grüningen Castle, Grüningen
20. Hegi Castle, Winterthur
21. Ruins of Hohenlandenberg Castle, Wila
22. Irgenhausen Castrum, Irgenhausen
23. Kyburg Castle, Kyburg
24. Ruins of Alt-Landenberg Castle, Bauma
25. Ruins of Alt-Lägern Castle, Boppelsen
26. Laufen Castle, Laufen-Uhwiesen
27. Liebenberg Castle, Zell
28. Mörsburg Castle, Stadel (Winterthur)
29. Ruins of Alt-Regensberg Castle, Regensdorf
30. Neu-Regensberg Castle, Regensberg
31. Ruins of Schauenberg Castle, Turbenthal
32. Ruins of Schnabelburg Castle, Hausen am Albis
33. Schwandegg Castle, Waltalingen
34. Ruins of Sünikon Castle, Steinmaur
35. Ruins of Tössegg Castle, Wildberg und Turbenthal
36. Ruins of Uetliburg Castle, Uetliberg
37. Uster Castle, Uster
38. Ruins of Alt Wädenswil Castle, Richterswil
39. Wart Castle, Neftenbach
40. Wiesendangen Castle, Wiesendangen
41. Ruins of Alt-Wildberg Castle, Wildberg
42. Ruins of Alt-Wülflingen Castle, Wülflingen in Winterthur
43. Wülflingen Castle, Wülflingen in Winterthur
44. Ruins of Wulp Castle, Küsnacht
45. Wyden Castle, Ossingen

== See also ==
- Castles in Switzerland
- List of castles
- List of cathedrals in Switzerland
- List of fortifications in Switzerland
- List of museums in Switzerland
- Lists of tourist attractions in Switzerland
