= Chalais Castle =

- Chalais in Switzerland
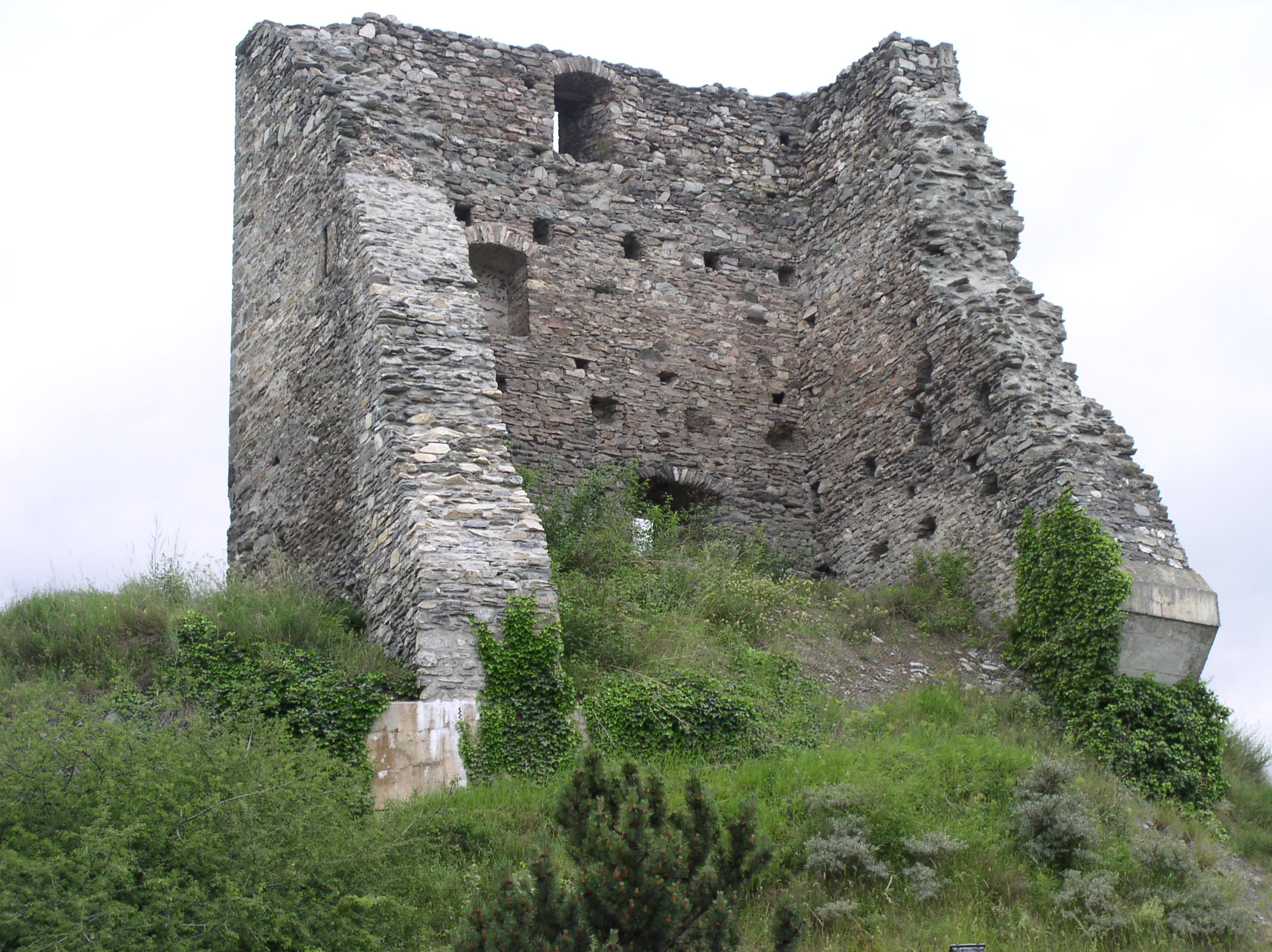
- Ruins of Chalais Castle

Location
- Coordinates: 46°16′01″N 7°30′33″E

Site history
- Built: 13th century

Chalais Castle is a ruined castle in the municipality of Chalais of the Canton of Valais in Switzerland.

== History ==
The rectangular castle tower was built in the 13th century above the village of Chalais by the Lords of Chalais. The family was related to the Bishop of Sion. It was later inherited by the Bluvignoud family before passing through the hands of several other noble families. The last family were the von Chevron who were the bailiffs of Sion and Sierre. In the mid-16th century the bishop of Sion bought the castle from the von Chevron family.

The castle was later abandoned but remained in good condition until the 20th century. In 1856, an attempt to demolish the castle to provide stone for a new church was unsuccessful. However, in the 1930s the hill below the castle was terraced for a vineyard. In 1936 this had undercut the castle enough that much of it collapsed.

== See also ==
- List of castles in Switzerland
- Château
