= Schauensee Castle =

Castle in Kriens, Switzerland

- Schlössli
- Kriens
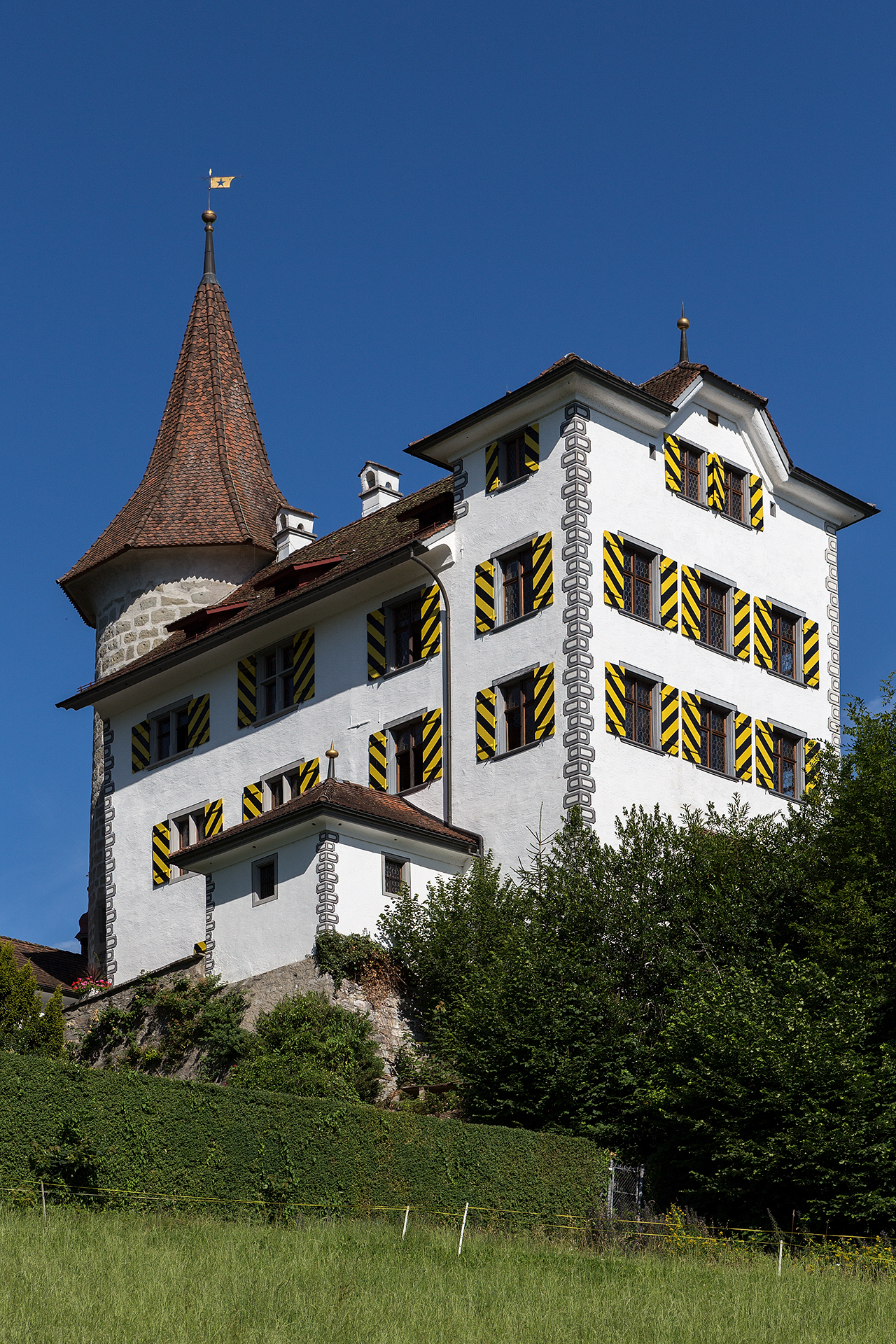
- Schauensee Castle

Site information
- Code: CH-LU
- Condition: preserved

Location
- Coordinates: 47°01′38″N 8°16′52″E
- Height: 572 m above the sea

Site history
- Built: 13th century

Schauensee Castle is a castle in the municipality of Kriens of the Canton of Lucerne in Switzerland.

== History ==
It was first mentioned in the 13th century in connection with the Knight Rudolf von Schauensee (1257–1317) and was probably built in the 13th century. By the beginning of the 14th century it was already in ruins. At the end of the 16th century, Johannes von Mettenwyl acquired the complex and rebuilt it, retaining only the tower from the original castle. In 1750 it was rebuilt to its current appearance under the "Meyer von Schauensee" family.

The municipality of Kriens was able to acquire the "Schlössli" in 1963. Today, the castle is used for cultural events and as a reception hall.

== See also ==
- List of castles in Switzerland
