= Alt-Bichelsee Castle =

Castle ruins in Thurgau, Switzerland

- Bichelsee-Balterswil
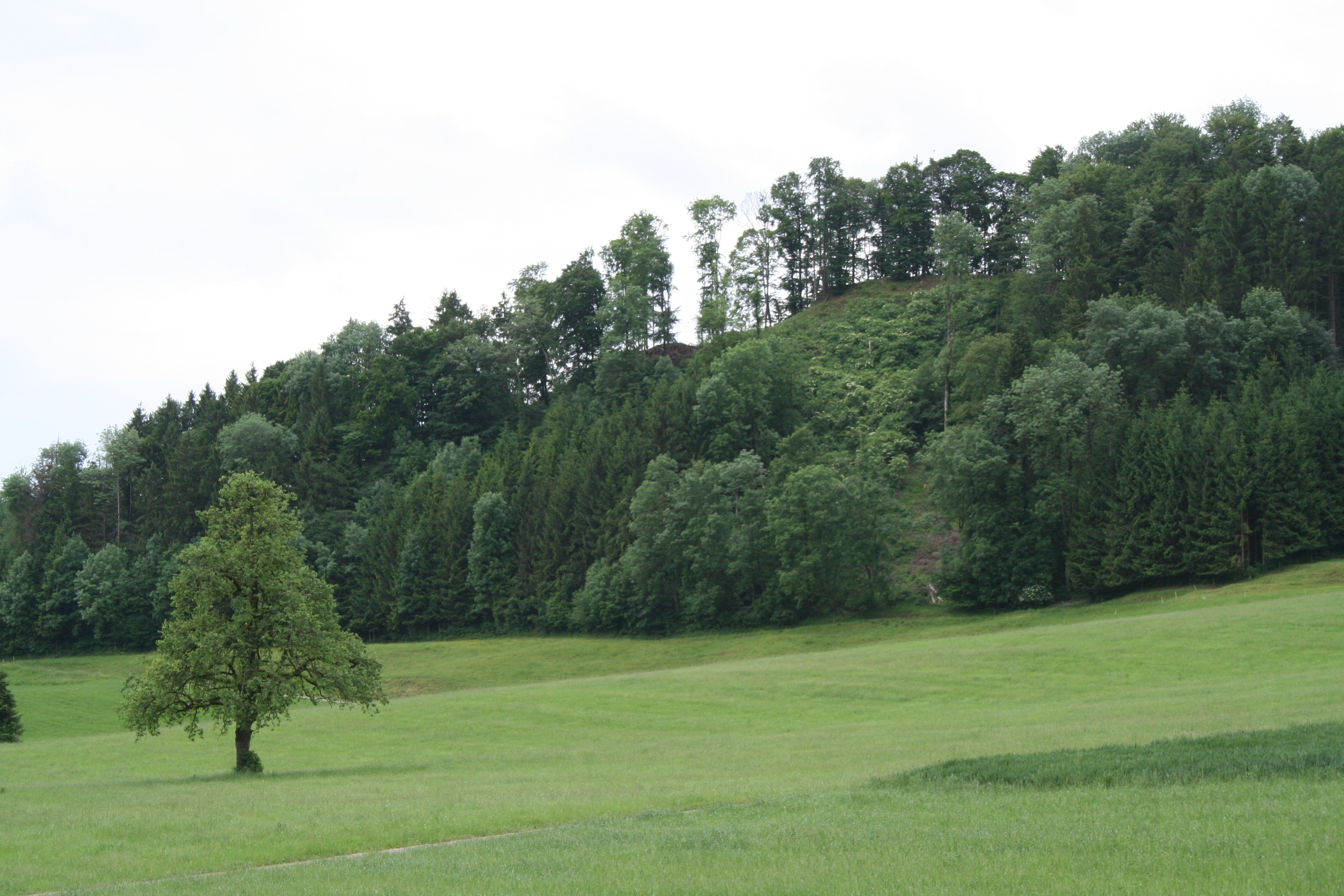
- Alt-Bichelsee Castle hill

Site information
- Type: hill castle
- Code: CH-TG
- Condition: ruin

Location
- Location within Canton of Thurgau Location within Switzerland
- Coordinates: 47°26′50″N 8°55′03″E

Site history
- Built: about 1250

Alt-Bichelsee Castle is a ruined castle in the Swiss Canton of Thurgau in the municipality of Bichelsee-Balterswil.

It was the ancestral home of the Hetren von Bichelsee family, closely associated with the abbey at St. Gallen, from 1104. Walter von Bichelsee sold the castle, forest and lake to Hermann von Landenberg-Greifensee in 1358 for 40 kilograms (88 lb) in silver, to help clear a debt. The Greifensees also fell on hard times and had to mortgage the estate to the Count of Toggenburg in 1369. In August 1407 the castle was destroyed by the Apenzellers who had gone to war with Abbot Kuno von Stoffeln of St. Gallen.The castle was rebuilt in 1421 and ownership split equally between Toggenburg and the Fischingen Monastery.

The site ceased to be inhabited by the mid 15th century and the Stumpf Chronicle of 1548 recorded it was ruined. Stone from the castle was later reused in a nearby house. The castle has been subject to archaeological investigation in 1911, 1980 and 1998. Numerous ceramic artefacts have been recovered alongside arrowheads, nails, glass shards and animal bones testifying to a wealthy existence at one point.

== See also ==
- List of castles in Switzerland
