= Bernegg Castle, Thurgau =

Swiss castle

Bernegg Castle
- Kreuzlingen
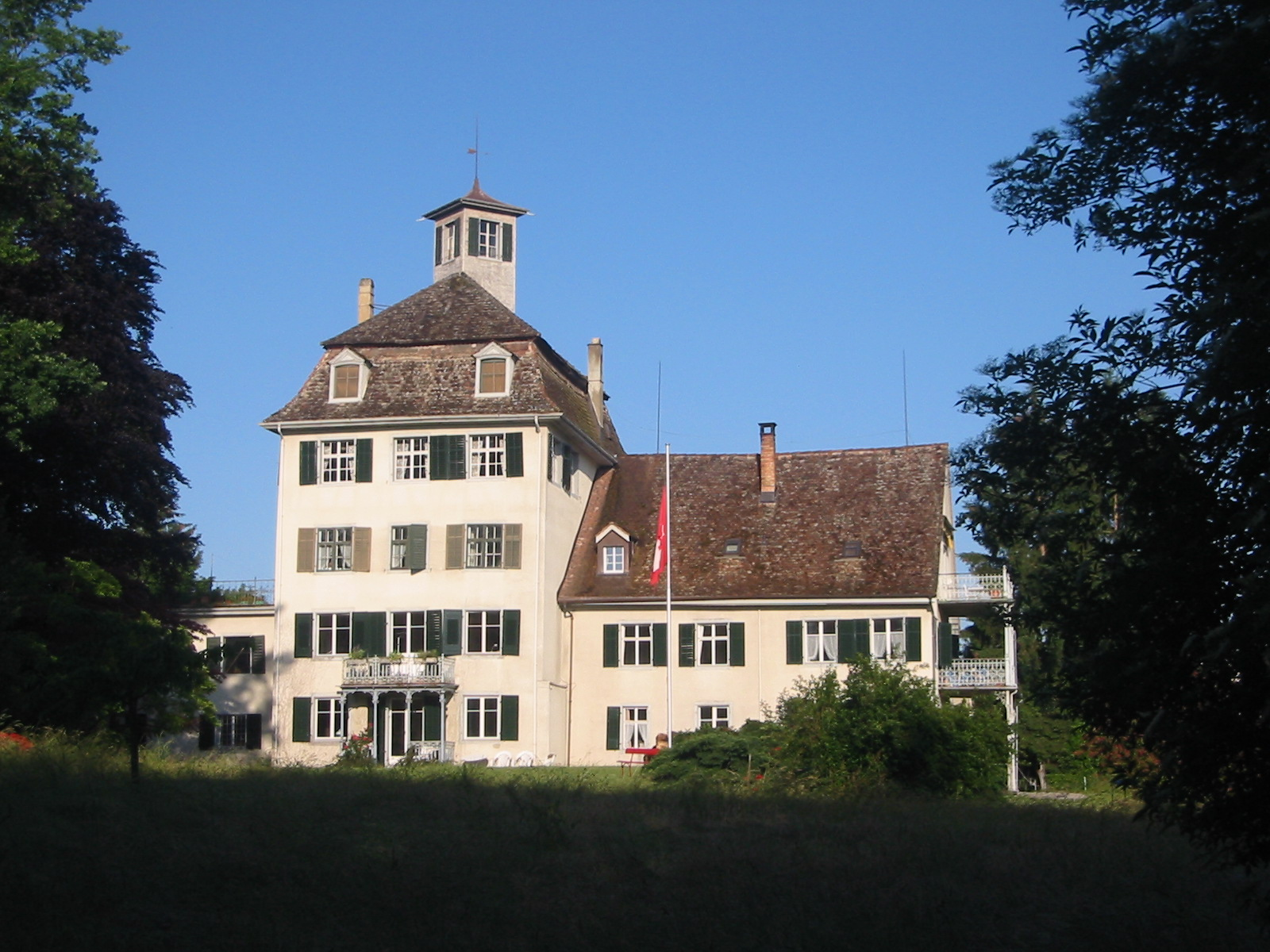
- Bernegg Castle

Site information
- Code: CH-TG

Location
- Location within Canton of Thurgau Location within Switzerland
- Coordinates: 47°38′39″N 9°09′32″E

Site history
- Built: about 1292

Bernegg Castle is a castle in the Swiss Canton of Thurgau in the village of Emmishofen, which is part of the municipality of Kreuzlingen.

The castle's four-story main section was built in 1795 and includes a tower. The main section is accompanied by two two-story wings. The wing near the street includes a terrace.

The castle has been attested since 1292. Since 1702, the castle has been under ownership of the family Merhart von Bernegg. Since the owner died childless in 1872, the castle has been inherited by the principle of seniority, whereby the oldest male descendant becomes the sole usufructuary.

== See also ==
- List of castles in Switzerland
