= Apro Castle =

Castle in Switzerland

- Seedorf
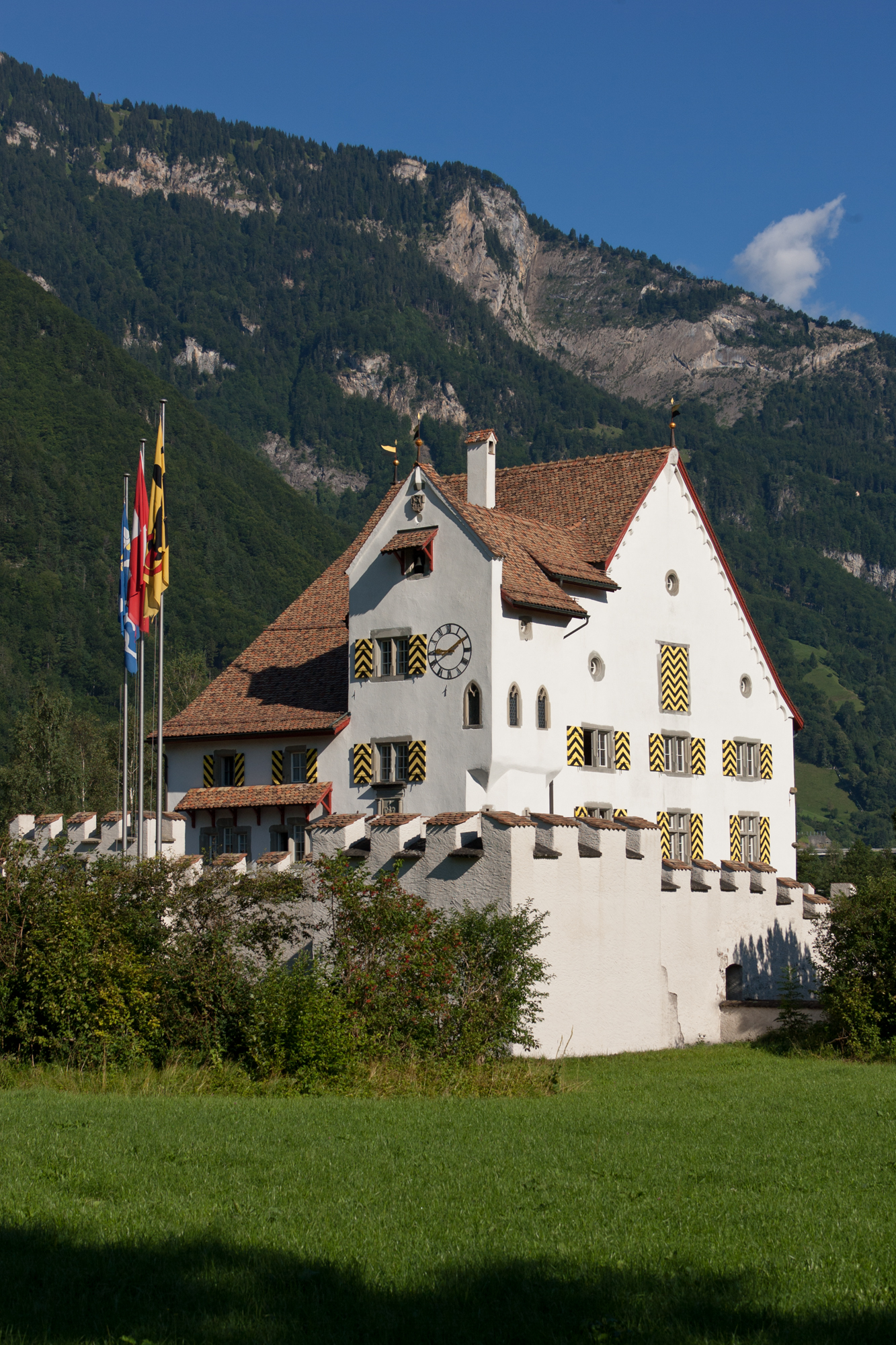
- Apro Castle

Site information
- Type: Rural mansion
- Code: CH-UR

Location
- Coordinates: 46°53′12″N 8°36′23″E

Site history
- Built: 1556

Apro Castle or A-Pro Castle is a castle in the municipality of Seedorf in the canton of Uri in Switzerland. It is a Swiss heritage site of national significance.

Part of the castle is the site of Uri's Crystal Museum.

== See also ==
- List of castles and fortresses in Switzerland
