= Castelberg Castle =

Ruined castle in Switzerland

- Luven, Ilanz/Glion
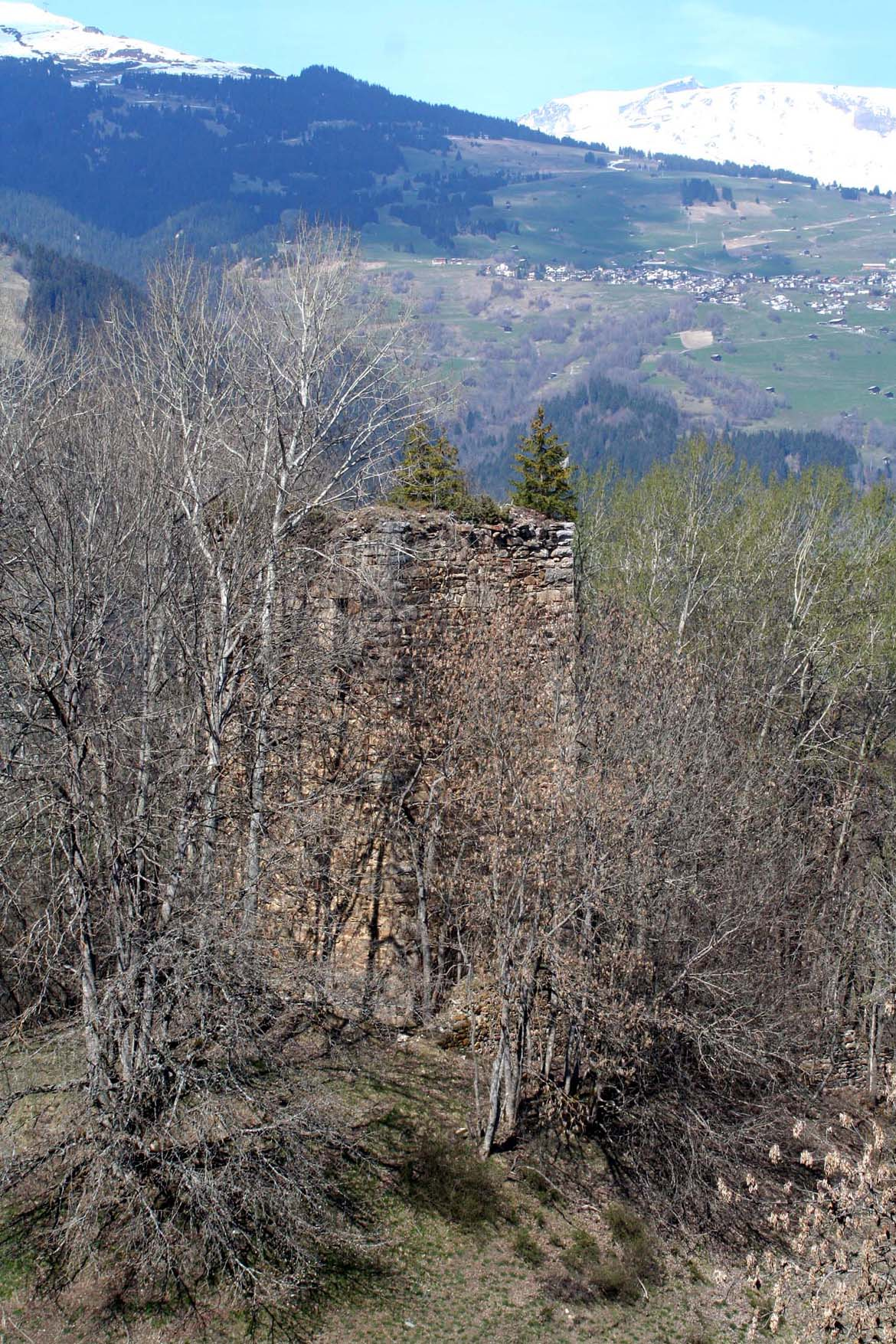
- Burg Castelberg

Site information
- Type: hill castle
- Code: CH-GR
- Condition: ruin

Location
- Coordinates: 46°45′24″N 9°12′35″E

Site history
- Built: early 13th century
- Materials: rubble stone

Castelberg Castle is a ruined castle in the municipality of Ilanz/Glion of the Canton of Graubünden in Switzerland.

== History ==
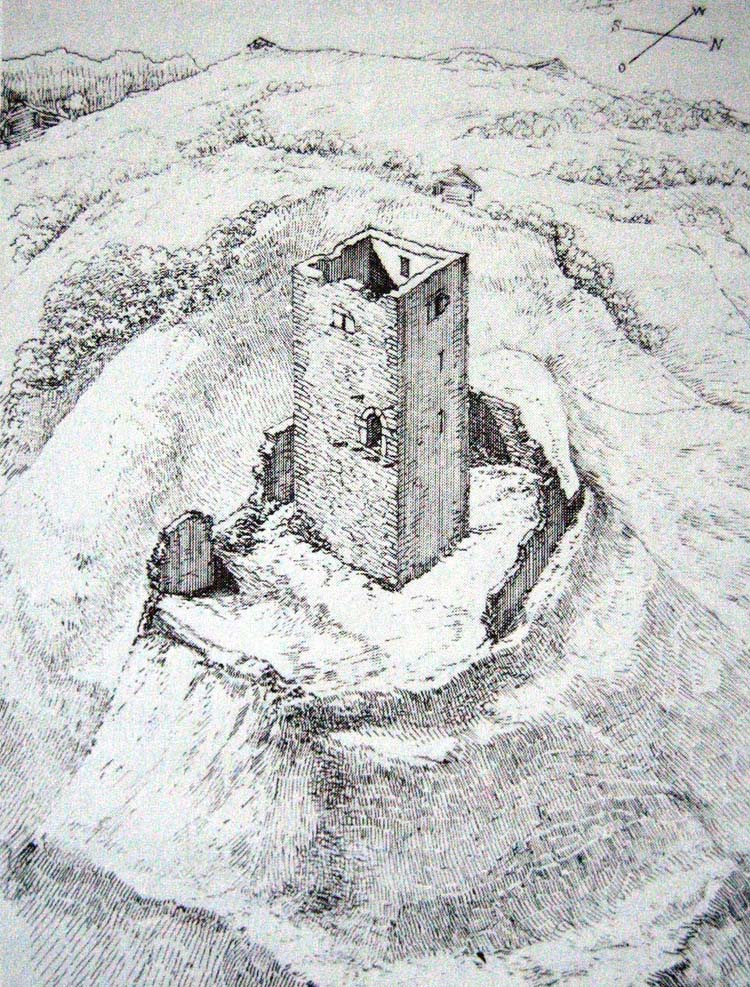
Castelberg in 1896

Castelberg is one of several castles built near Ilanz, a major town along the Vorderrhein river. The castle itself does not appear in any surviving records, but based on construction it was built in the first half of the 13th century. It was the home castle of the Castelberg family which were first mentioned in 1289. The family were originally a ministerialis family, unfree knights in service to a higher noble, in this case the Bishop of Chur. The estates around the castle were mentioned in 1391. However, Castelburg Castle was probably abandoned in the early 14th century. An excavation in 1968/69 discovered that the plaster on the walls had turned red, a sign that it had been exposed to a large fire. Whether the fire forced the Castelbergs to abandon the castle or if it happened after they left is unknown. By the 16th century it was described as a ruin.

After abandoning the castle, the family grew in power. By 1400 they owned Surcasti Castle, Löwenstein Castle, Baldenstein Castle and the ruins of Castelberg Castle. Rudolf von Castelberg was the bishop's vogt in Lugnez in 1461-62 and 1468. By the 15th century the family held estates in Lugnez, the Groub valley, Schams, Domleschg and in Vorarlberg. Around 1500 the family had split into several cadet branches including a Protestant branch in the Groub region and Ilanz and a Catholic branch that was driven out of Ilanz to Disentis during the Protestant Reformation. The Disentis branch produced three abbots of the famous abbey there, along with ten individuals who served a total of thirty times as the Landrichter (the highest executive position in the Grey League). Other members of the family were Swiss officers for the kings of France, Sardinia and Naples. The castle is now owned by the Castelberg family.

== Castle site ==
The castle is located on a hill near Lugnez. The main tower is a 9 by 9 meters (30 ft × 30 ft) square tower with walls up to 1.85 m (6.1 ft) thick. It is four stories tall and was probably topped with a wooden structure. The high entrance is located on the third story east side. A garderobe on the west side fourth story was bricked up, but is still visible from the exterior. The tower is surrounded with a rectangular ring wall that is 5–10 m (16–33 ft) from the tower and is about 1 m (3.3 ft) thick. The north wall is missing and was probably destroyed when that side of the hill collapsed. On the east end of the ring wall is another stone building, of unknown function.

== Gallery ==
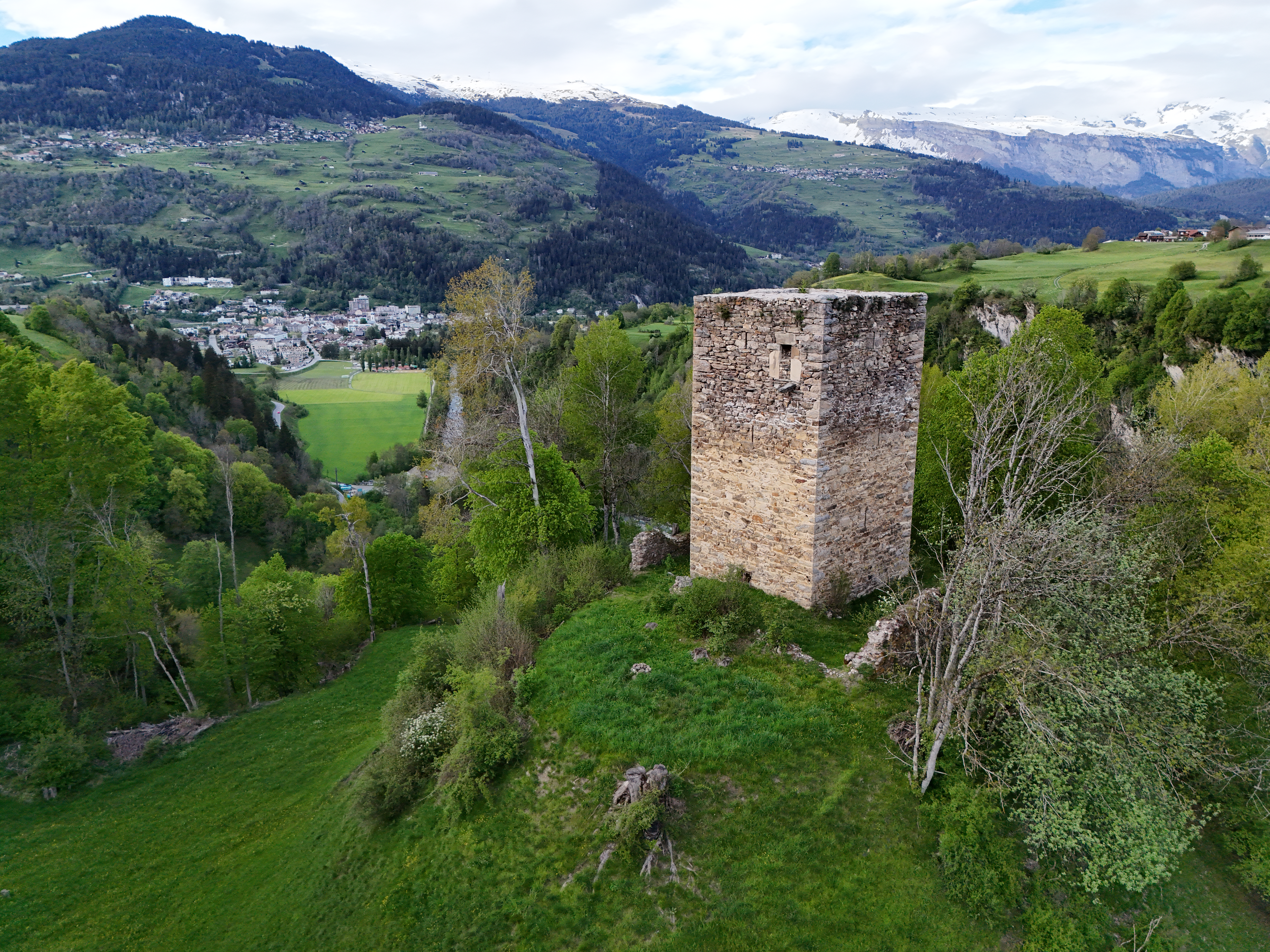
General view in context of the area

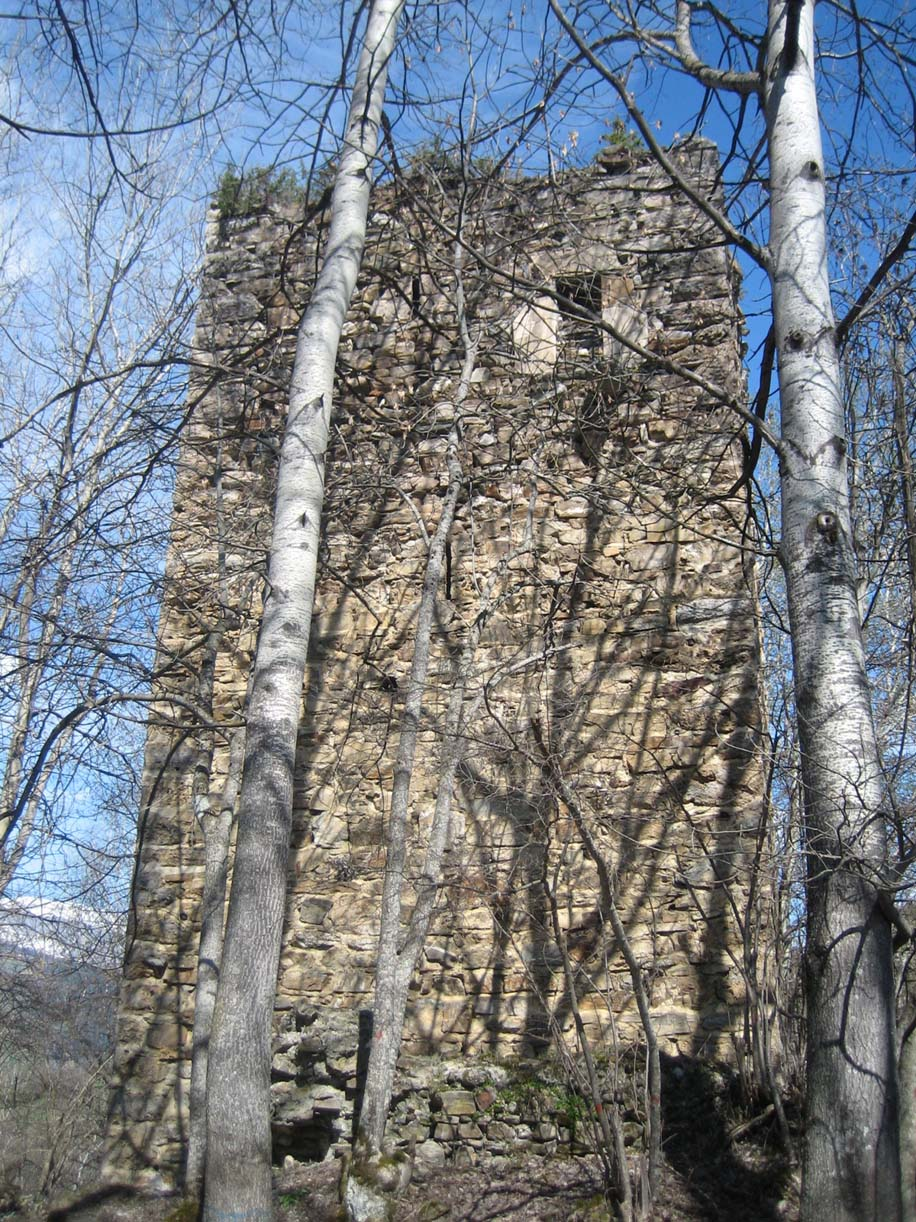
Tower

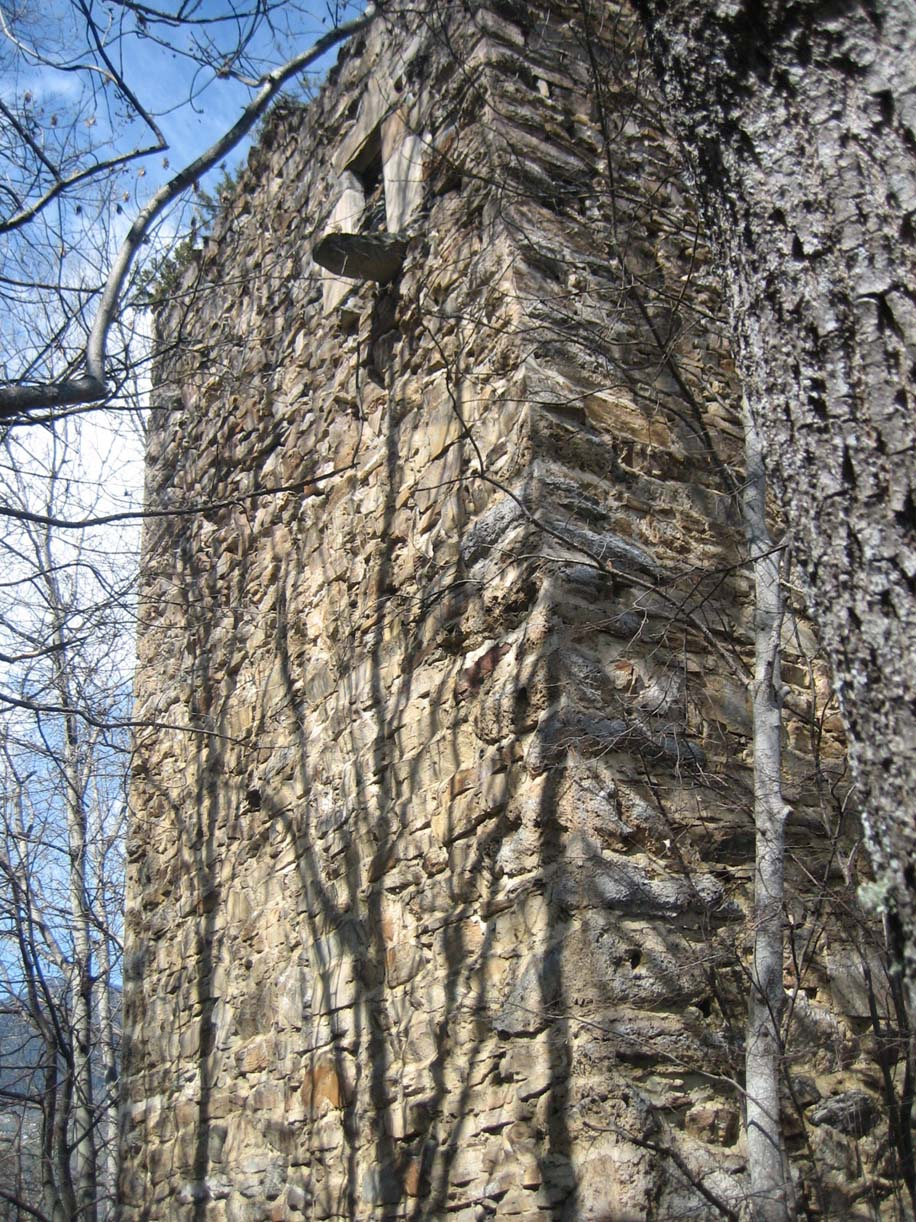
Garderobe on the fourth story

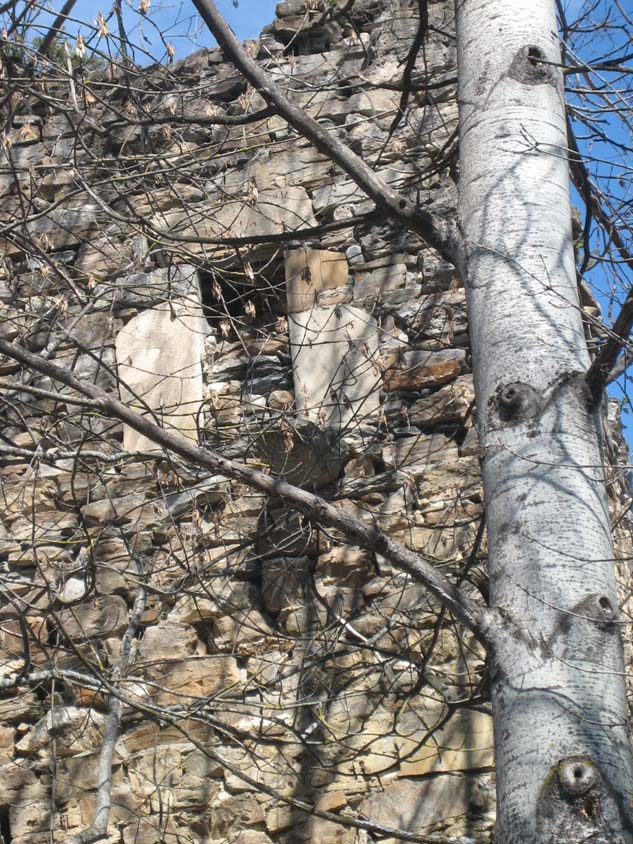

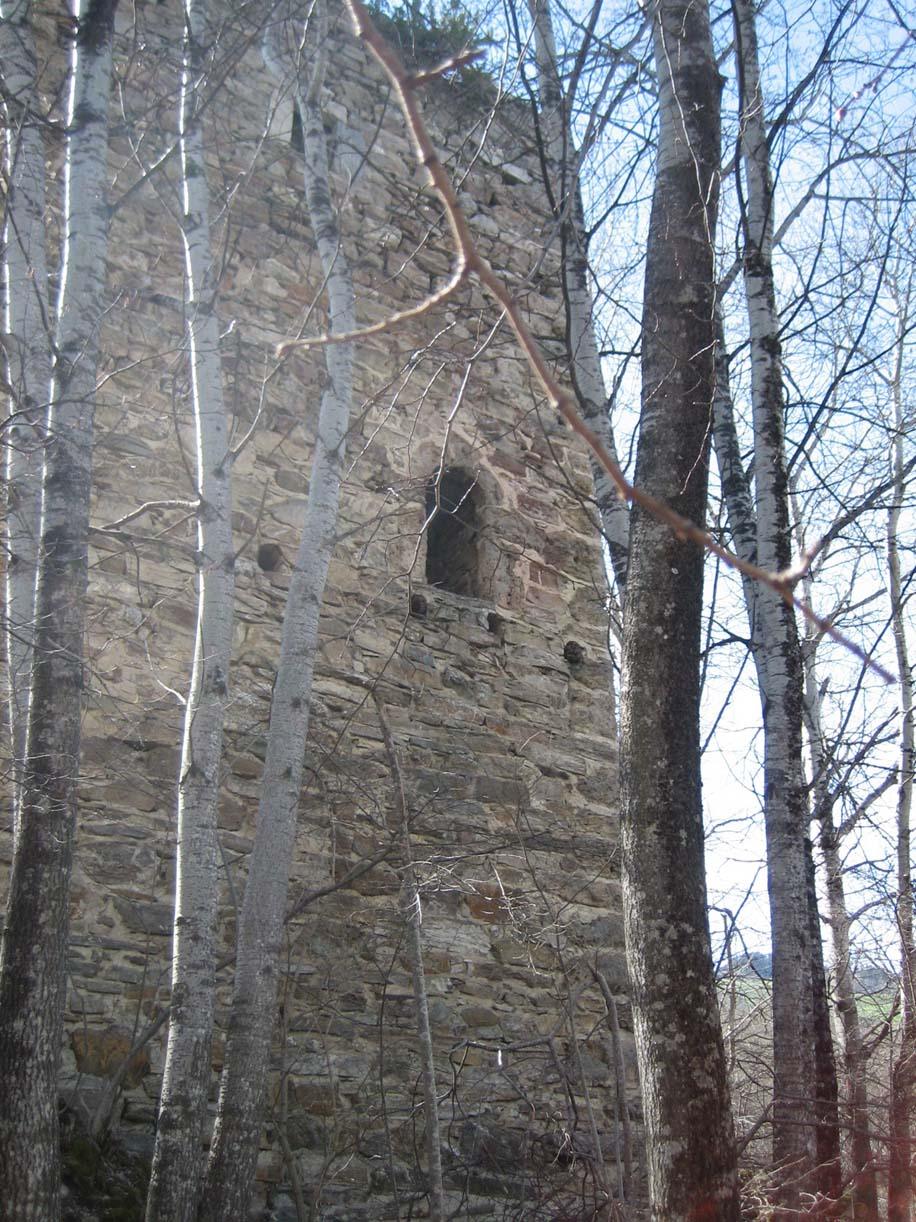
Third story high entrance

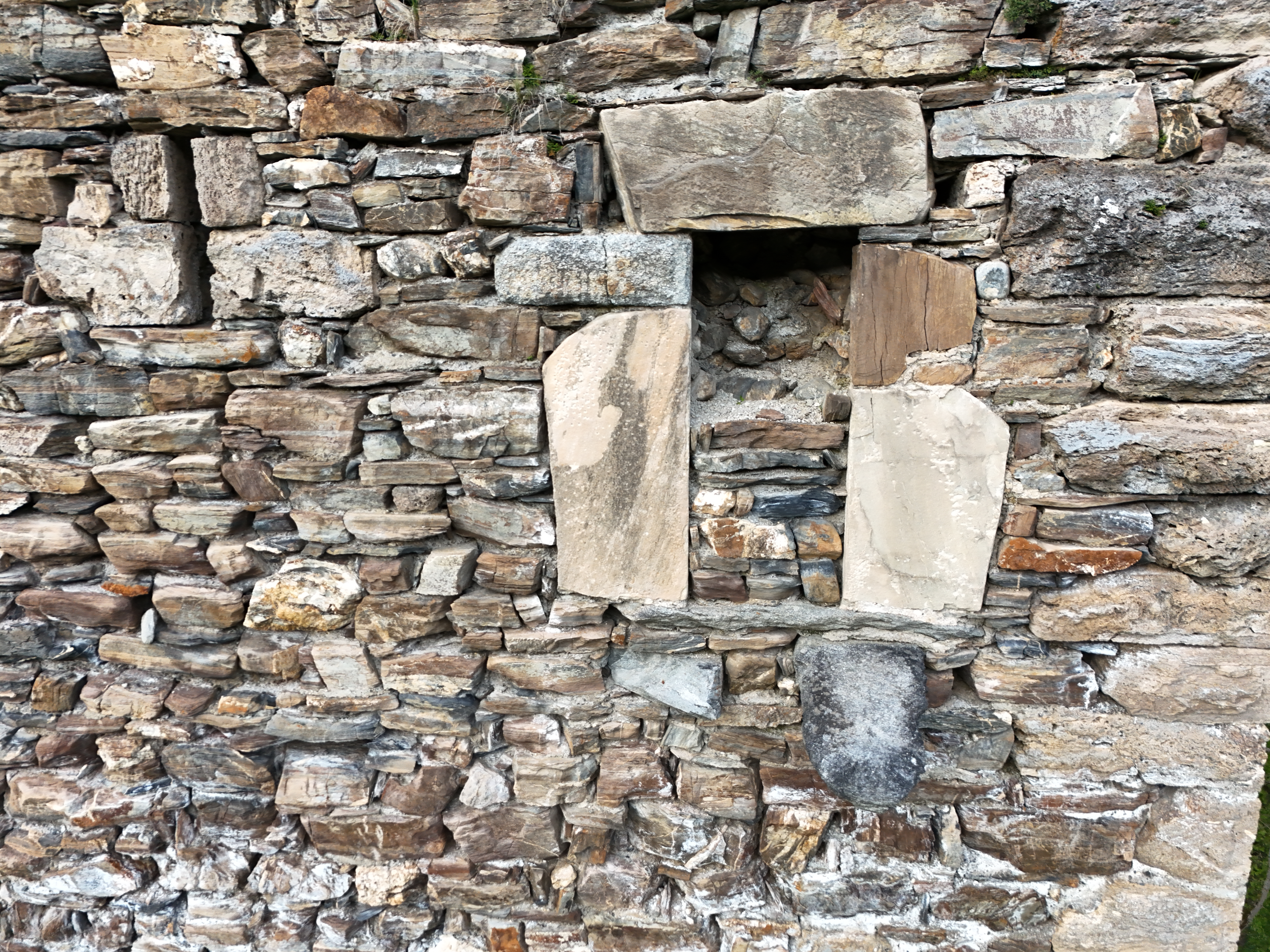
Close up of the bricked up garderobe

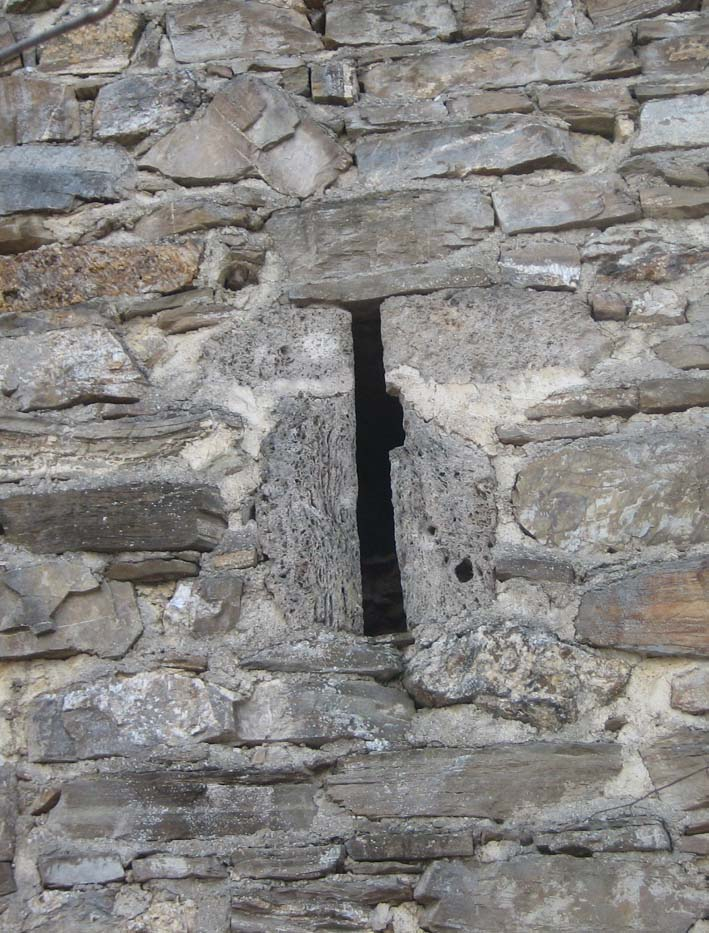
Embrasure window

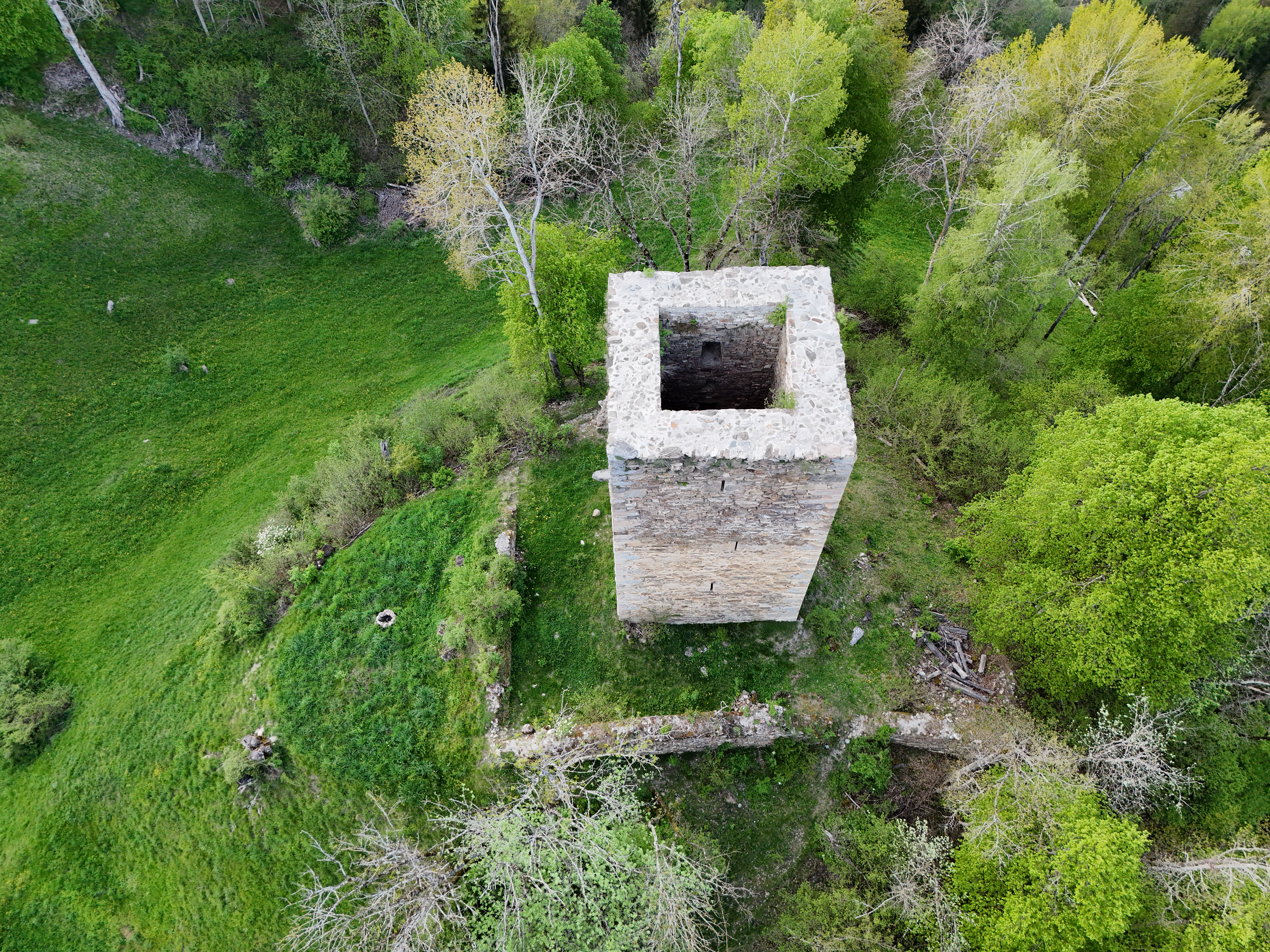
Top Aerial view

== See also ==
- List of castles in Switzerland
