= Heidenberg Castle =

Castle in Obersaxen Mundaun

- Obersaxen Mundaun
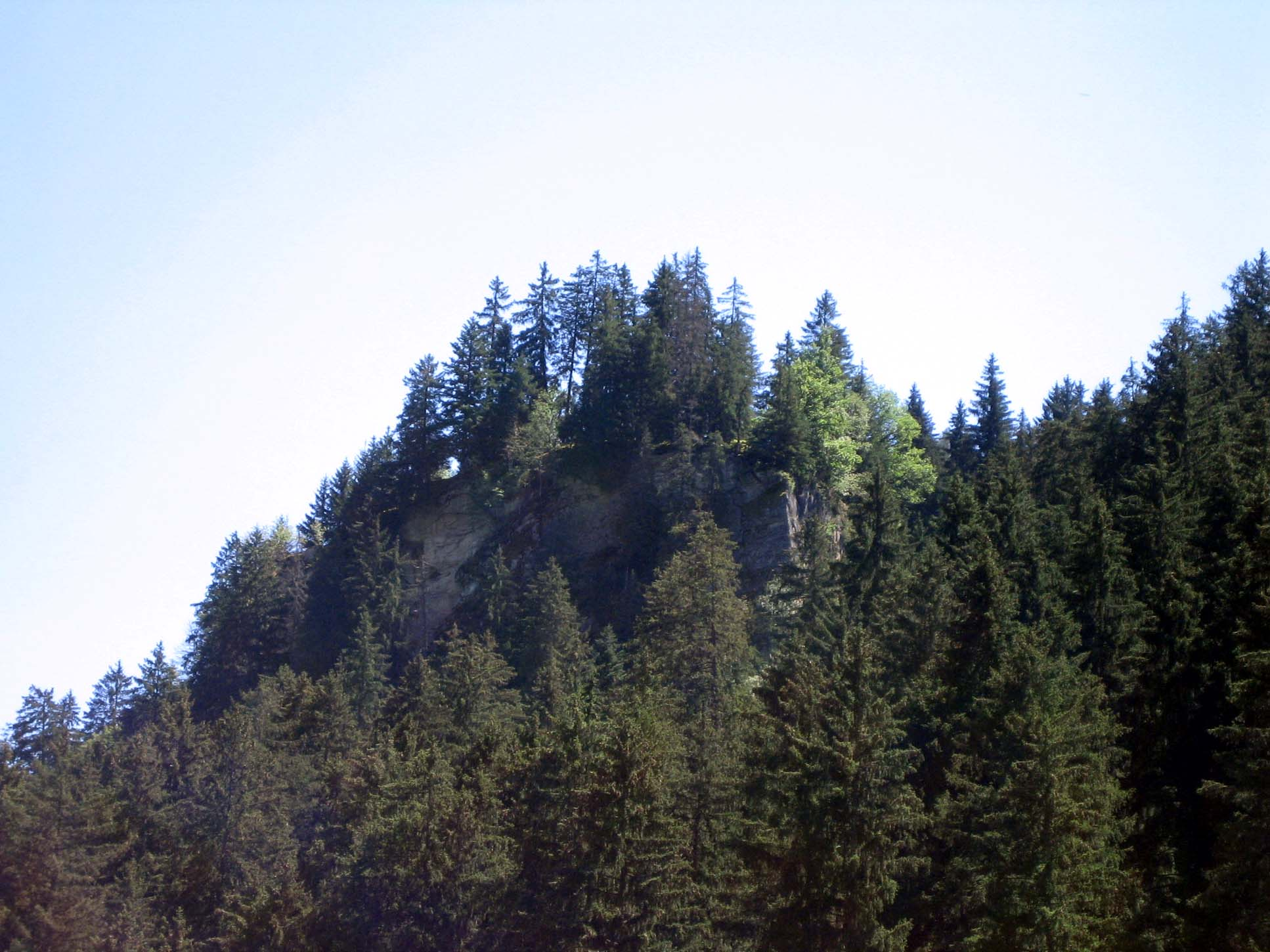
- Ruins of Heidenberg above Tavanasa

Site information
- Type: hill castle
- Code: CH-GR
- Condition: ruin

Location
- Location within Canton of Graubünden Location within Switzerland
- Coordinates: 46°45′8″N 9°3′47″E
- Height: 950 m above the sea

Site history
- Built: 11th or 12th century
- Materials: ashlar masonry

Heidenberg Castle is a ruined castle in the municipality of Obersaxen Mundaun of the Canton of Graubünden in Switzerland.

== History ==
Heidenberg Castle was the first of four castles built to defend and control the region around Obersaxen. The Obersaxen plateau first appears in historic records in 765 when Bishop Tello gave his farms and meadows there to Disentis Abbey. In 806 it became an Imperial Estate, which it remained until 956 when Emperor Otto I donated the village and the village church back to the Bishop of Chur. To control this important village along the Rhine river, four castles were built at various points throughout the Middle Ages. The first was Heidenberg above Tavanasa which may have been built as early as 1000. It was followed by Moregg and Saxenstein (around 1200) and Schwarzenstein (13th century). However, Heidenberg does not appear in any surviving medieval records. In 1468 the inheritance of the Counts of Rhäzüns the other three castles around Obersaxen were mentioned, but Heidenberg was omitted, probably indicating that it had already fallen into ruin. In 1556 the Obersaxen castles of Schwarzenburg, Saxenstein and Heydnischburg were fixed as the border between Obersaxen and Waltensburg. In 1573 the chronicle of Ulrich Campell calls the ruins Heidabergum.

Today only a few ruins of the tower and outer wall remain.

== Castle site ==
The castle is located atop a small, rocky outcropping above the village of Tavanasa in the Surselva valley. The castle site is surrounded on three sides by steep cliffs and can only be reached from the fourth or mountain side. Though even on the mountain side, a smaller cliff partially blocks the way. Due to its isolated location and strong natural barriers, Heidenberg may have originally been built as a refuge castle before eventually becoming the home of minor knights. The top of the outcropping is about 100 by 60 meters (330 ft × 200 ft) with castle ruins on the south-west side. The polygonal tower was built with walls that are 1.7 m (5.6 ft) thick. Portions of the castle walls are still visible along the south and west sides of the outcropping. There were probably other buildings inside the castle, but no traces remain.

== Gallery ==
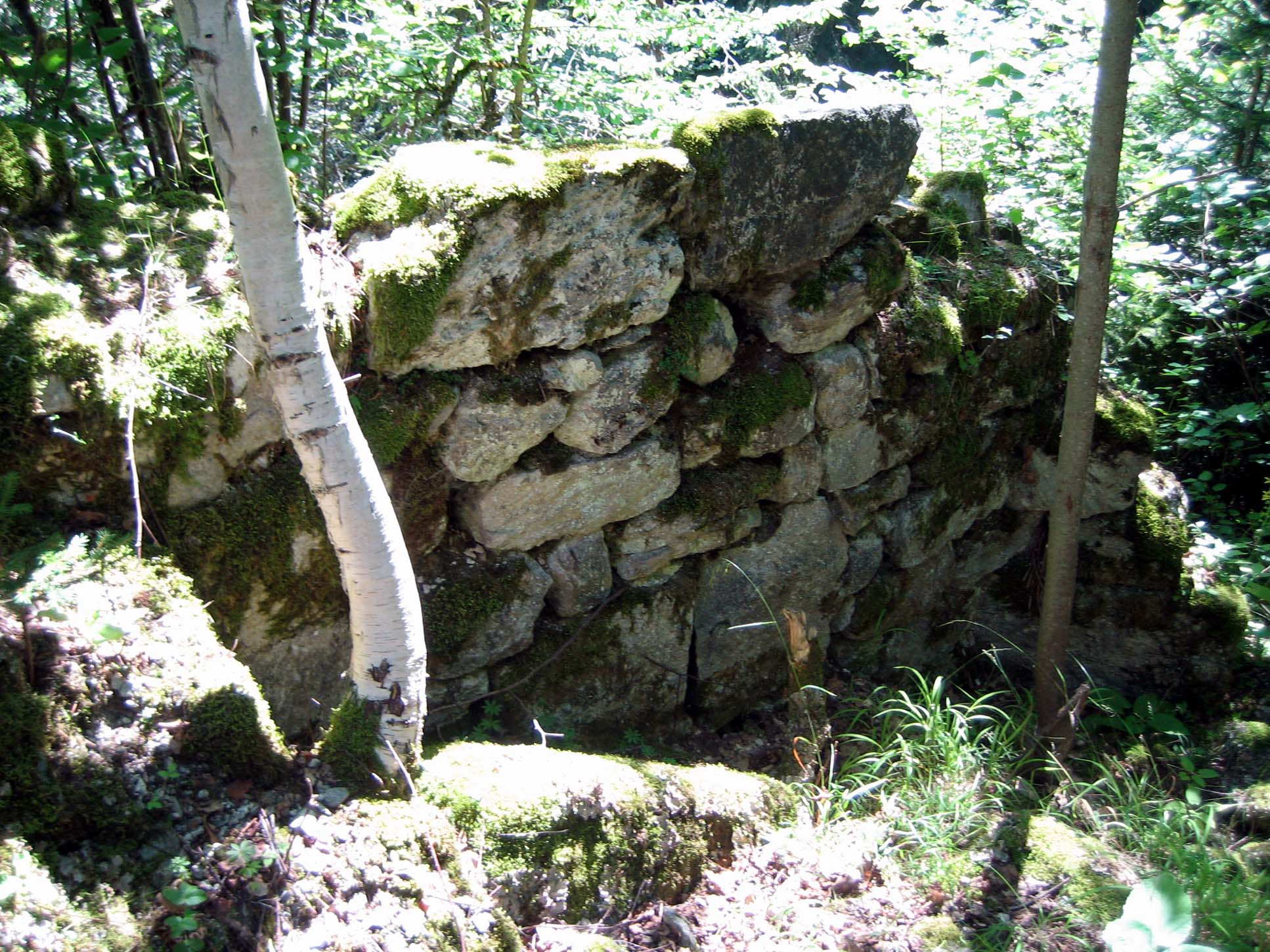
Interior of the east wall

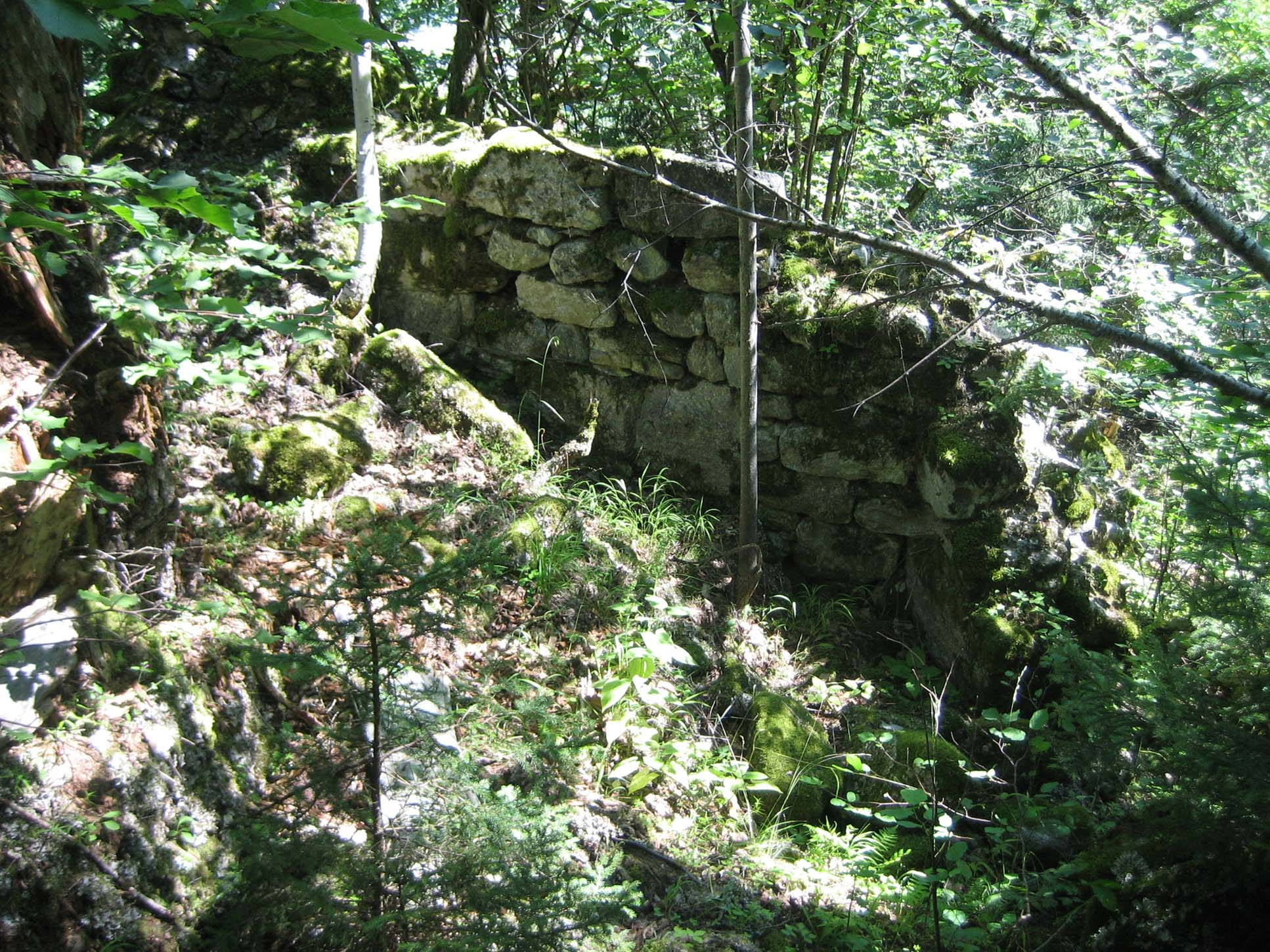
Tower ruins

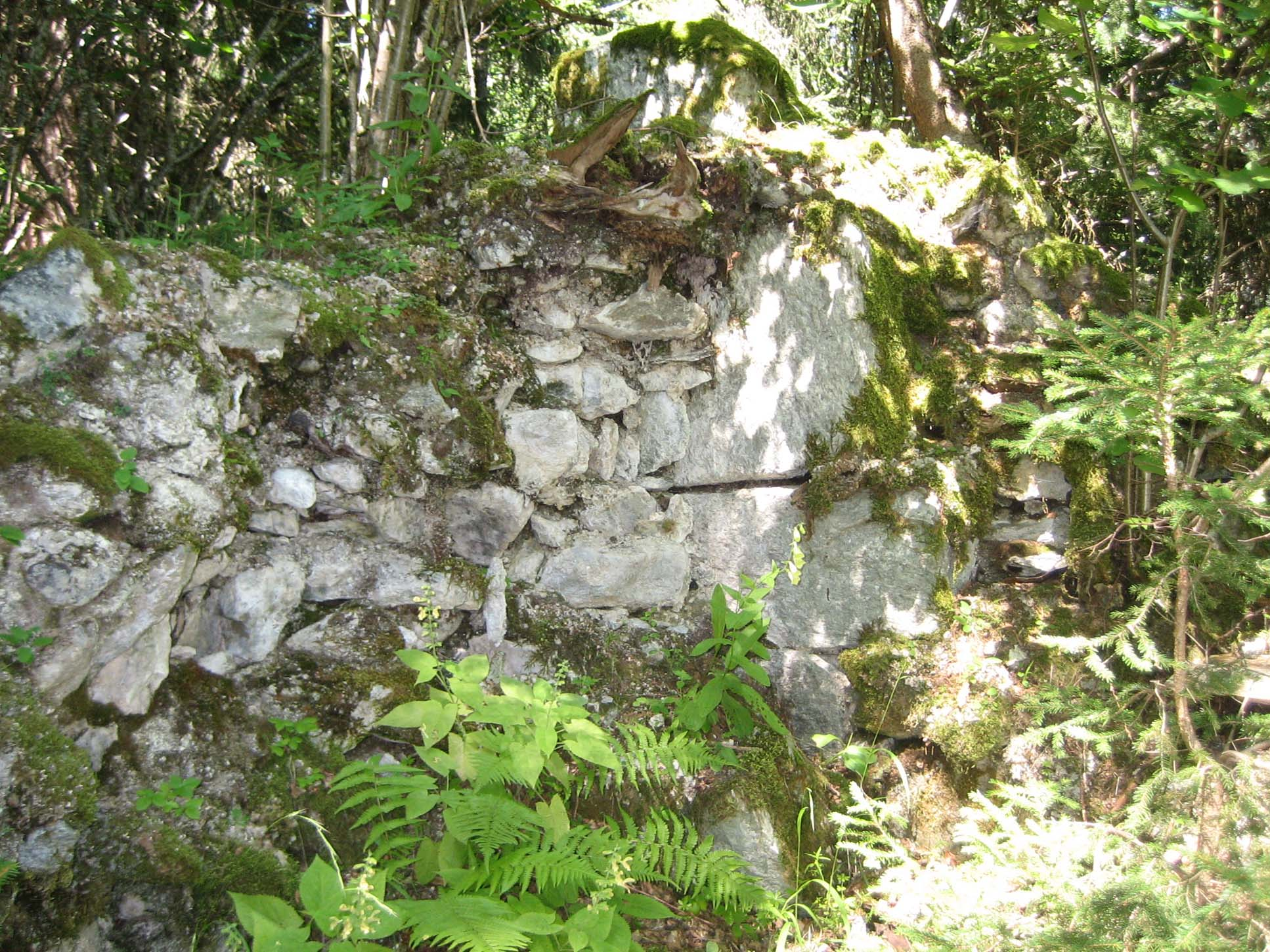
Interior of the tower

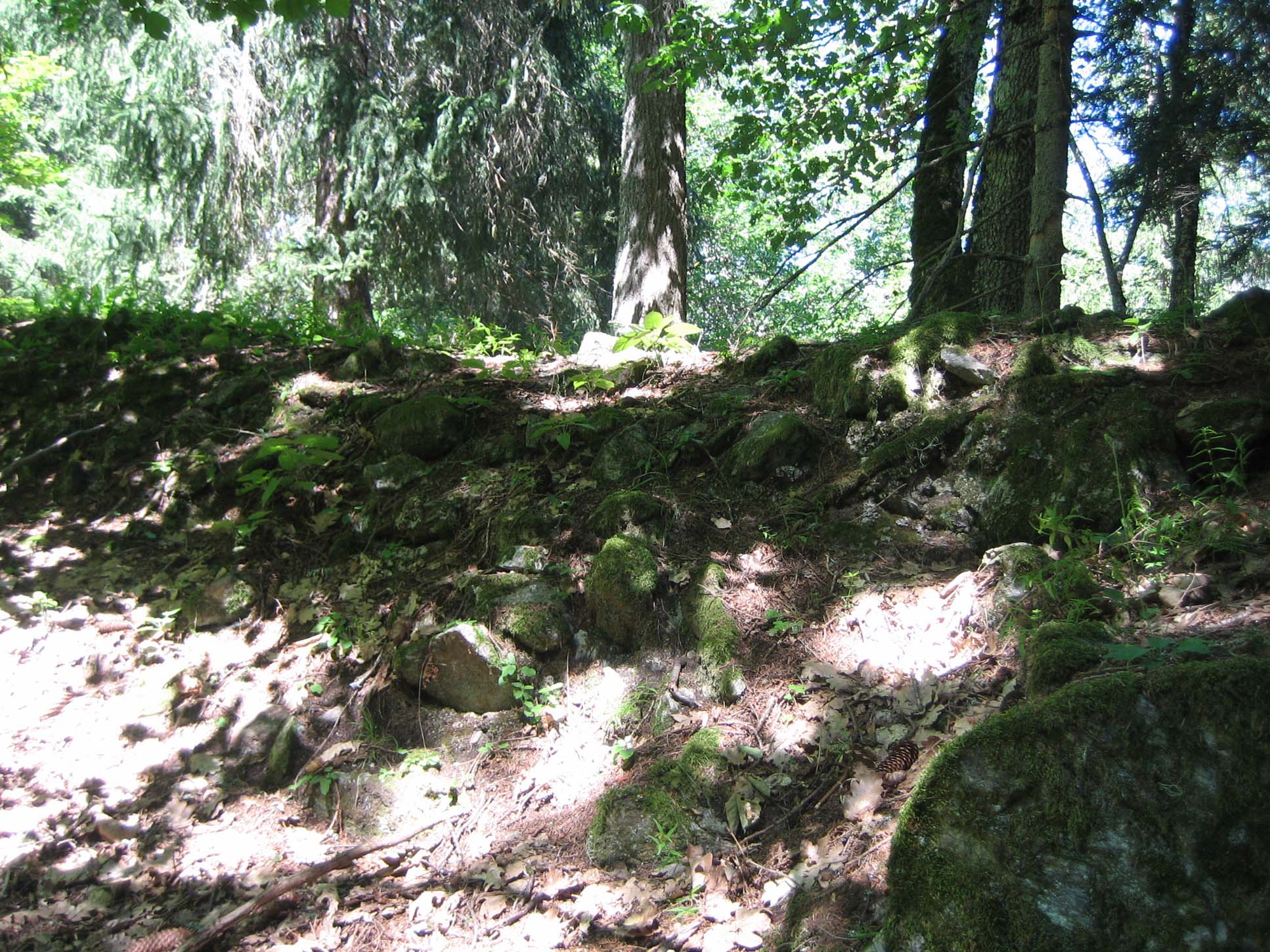
Outer wall

== See also ==
- List of castles in Switzerland
