= Thomas Conrad von Baldenstein =

Swiss naturalist (1784–1878)

- Born: 28 January 1784; Baldenstein Castle, Sils im Domleschg
- Died: 14 September 1878 (aged 94)
- Parents: Francesco Conrad von Baldenstein (father); Katharina von Salis-Haldenstein (mother)

Thomas Conrad von Baldenstein (28 January 1784 – 14 September 1878) was a Swiss ornithologist, entomologist and apiarist. He produced a number of scientific works on the birdlife of the Alps, and was the first to describe the willow tit.

== Biography ==
Conrad was born at Baldenstein Castle in Sils im Domleschg, in the Graubünden, the son of Francesco Conrad von Baldenstein and Katharina von Salis-Haldenstein. He attended school in Baldenstein and Reichenau and began law studies at the University of Erlangen, which he did not complete. At around the age of 20, Conrad enlisted in the Christ Regiment, a unit of Swiss mercenaries in the service of Sardinia. He left the regiment in 1816 with the rank of captain.

After returning to Switzerland, Conrad occupied himself with managing his estates in Baldenstein and Chiavenna and devoted himself to the natural sciences, especially ornithology. Conrad published numerous works on natural history, including the first description of the willow tit (1827). The manuscript of his unfinished work Die Vögel Graubündens ("The Birds of Graubünden") is kept in the State Archives of the Graubünden, as is Der Vogelbauer, which contains 83 plates with watercolors and was first printed in 1981.
