= Baldenstein Castle =

Castle in Switzerland

- Schloss Baldenstein
- Sils im Domleschg
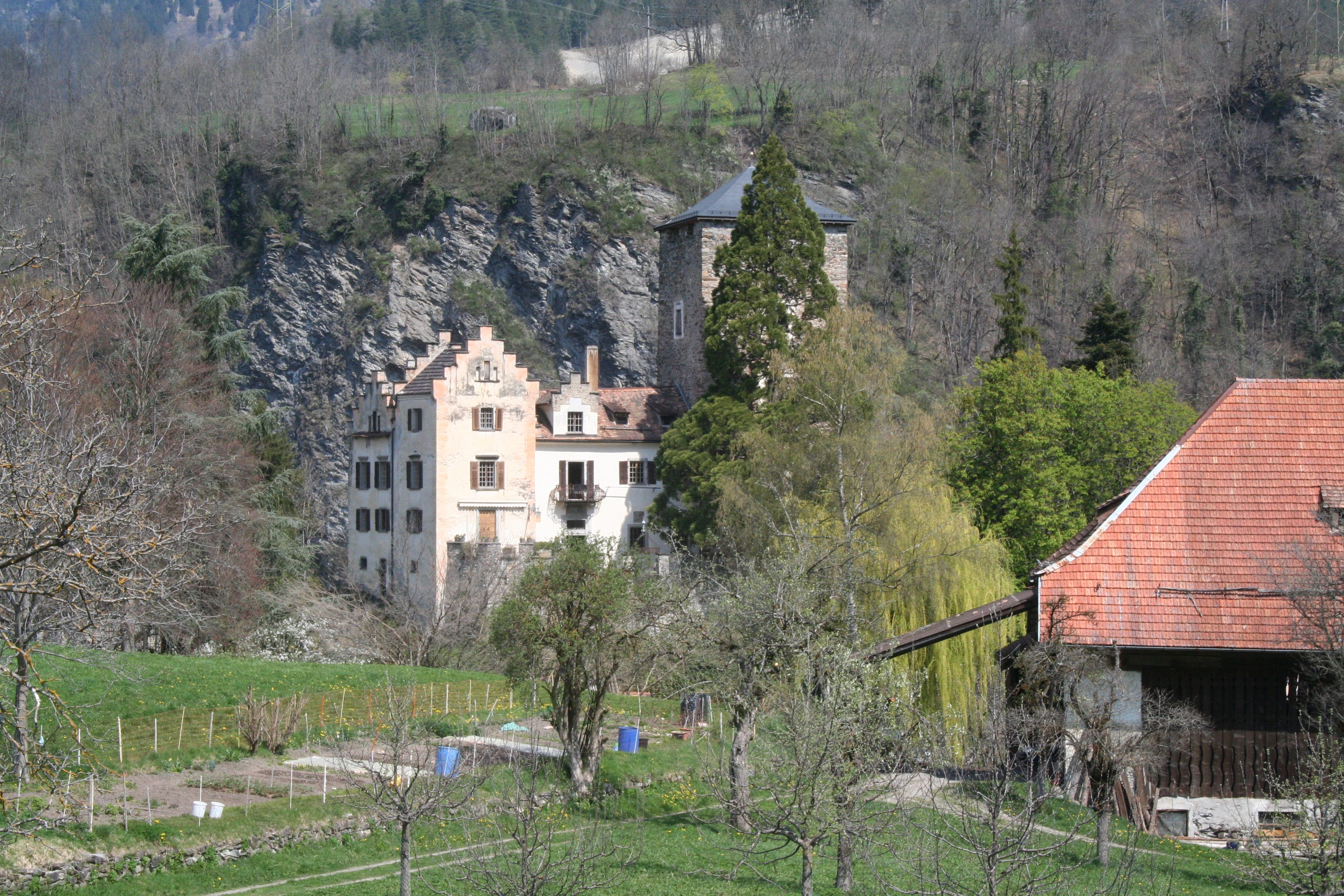
- Baldenstein Castle

Site information
- Type: hill castle
- Code: CH-GR
- Condition: privately owned

Location
- Coordinates: 46°42′23″N 9°27′37″E
- Height: 695 m above the sea

Site history
- Built: around 1246

Baldenstein Castle is a castle in the municipality of Sils im Domleschg of the Canton of Graubünden in Switzerland.

== History ==
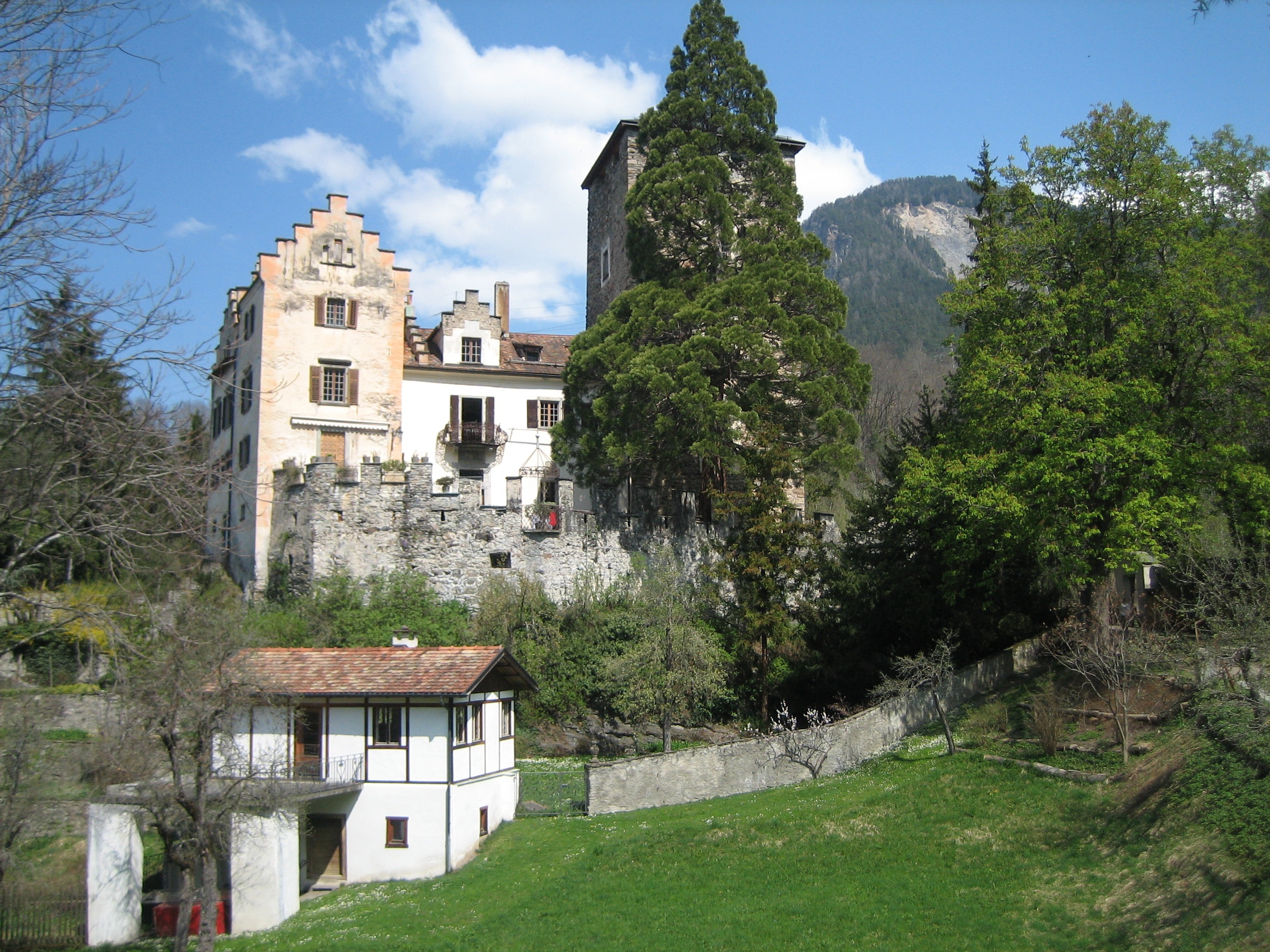
View of the castle from the south.

Baldenstein Castle was the family castle for the Knights of Baldenstein, the first of which was mentioned in 1246. The central tower which now forms part of the castle was built around the same time. Very little is recorded about the Baldenstein family and by 1289 the castle was owned by the Freiherr von Löwenstein. Before 1289 he lost the castle in a war with the Freiherr von Rhäzüns, but in the peace treaty of that year received it back after giving Schwarzenstein Castle to Rhäzüns. In 1349 it passed to the Übercastel family. Wilhelm von Übercastel planned to expand and strengthen the castle, but was prevented by the Bishop of Chur, until he granted the Bishop certain rights. Originally the castle consisted of a rectangular bergfried. During the Late Middle Ages an administrative and residential wing was added to the west.

Around 1400 the castle passed to the Freiherr von Stein. Through marriage it then passed to the von Ringg (later Ringg von Baldenstein) family in 1453. In 1562 Luzius Ringg sold the castle to Jakob Ruinelli. The Ruinelli family lived in the castle for several generations. Jakob's grandson, also named Jakob, accompanied Jürg Jenatsch to Rietberg Castle in 1621 to murder Pompeius Planta during the Bündner Wirren. He, in turn, was stabbed to death in 1627 in a brawl between drunken officers. After his death the castle was inherited by the Rosenroll family. During the 16th and 17th centuries the castle was further expanded with a new, larger wing replacing the medieval residential wing. During the same time, the medieval ring wall was replaced with a new crenelated wall.

In 1738 the castle was acquired by the Salis-Sils family, who owned it for almost half a century. In 1782 it was inherited by Francesco Conrado, from Chiavenna in Italy. Francesco became a member of Senate of the Helvetic Republic after the French invasion of Switzerland in 1798. Eventually his descendants changed their name to Conrad and still own the castle. In 1877 the residential wing was mostly destroyed in a fire. It was rebuilt to its present appearance in the following years.

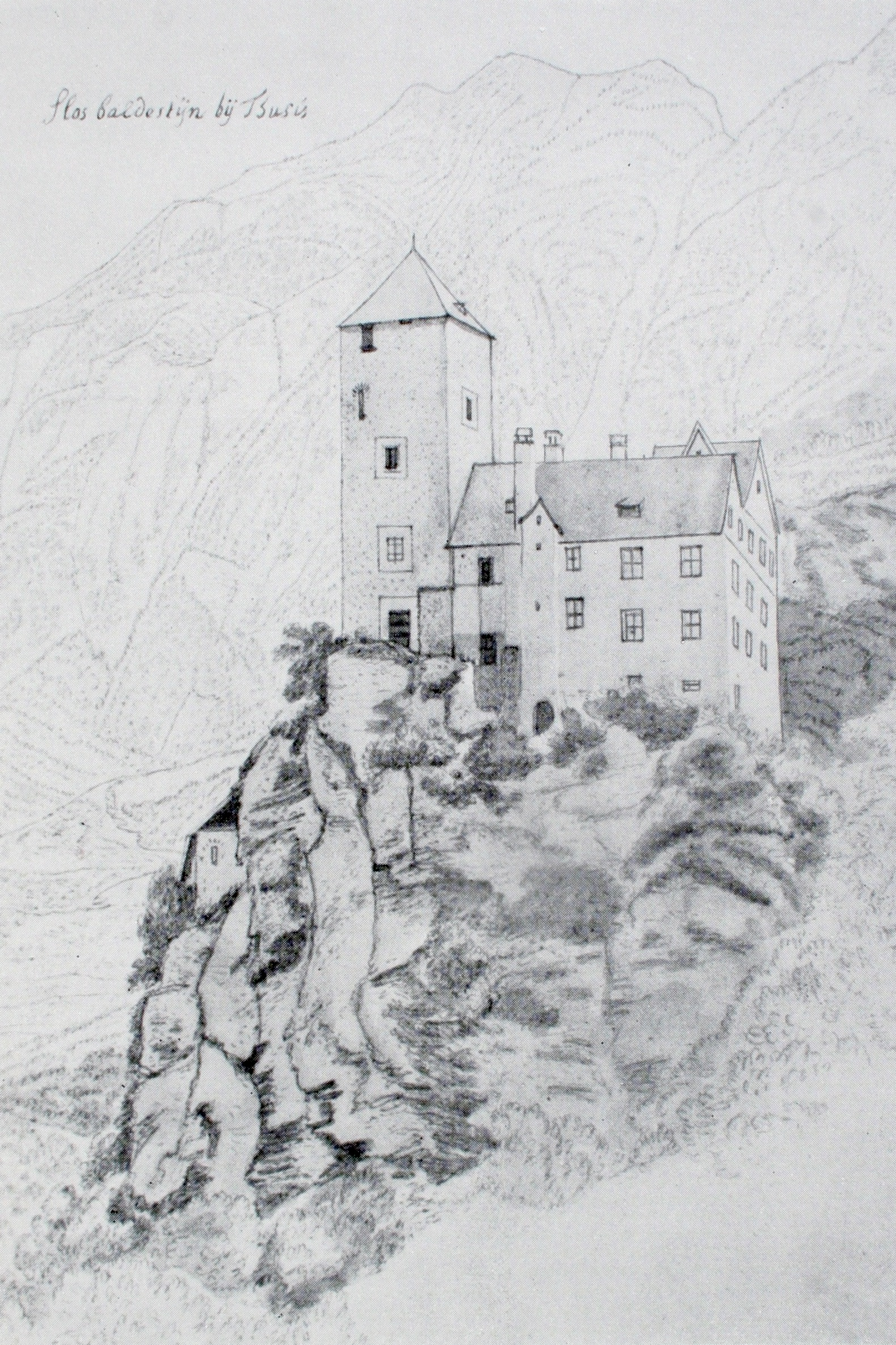
Baldenstein in 1655

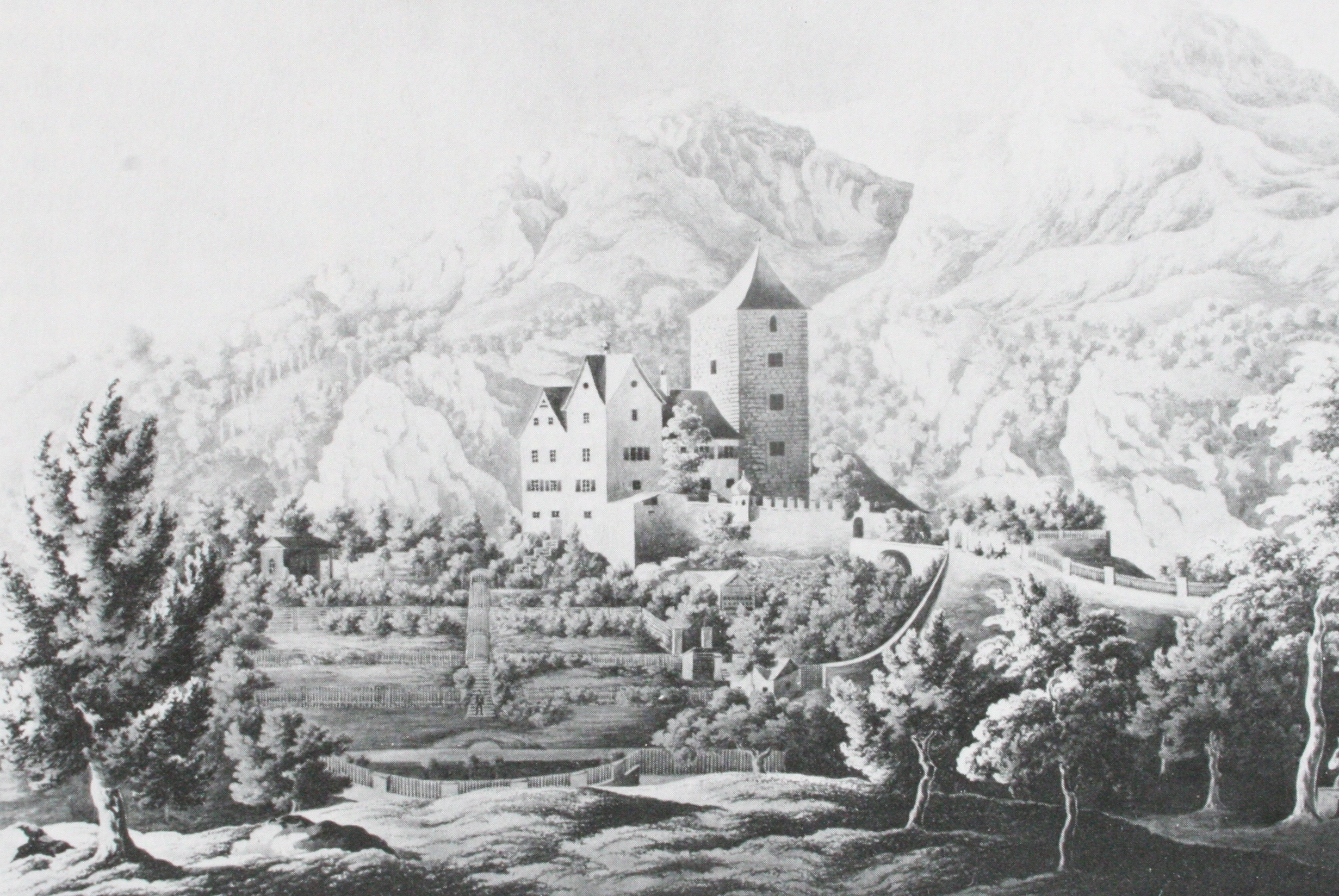
Baldenstein in 1816

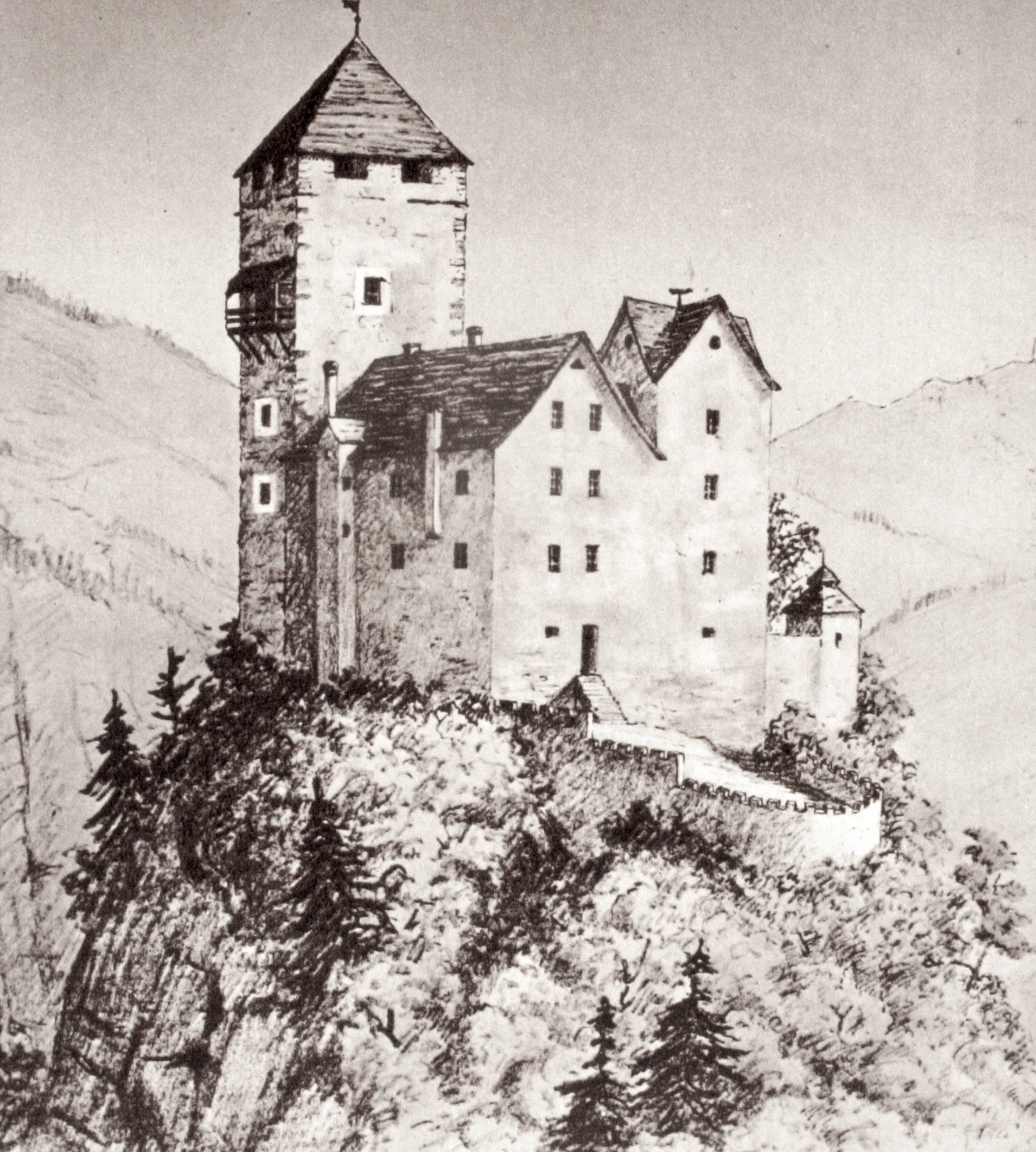
Baldenstein in 1840

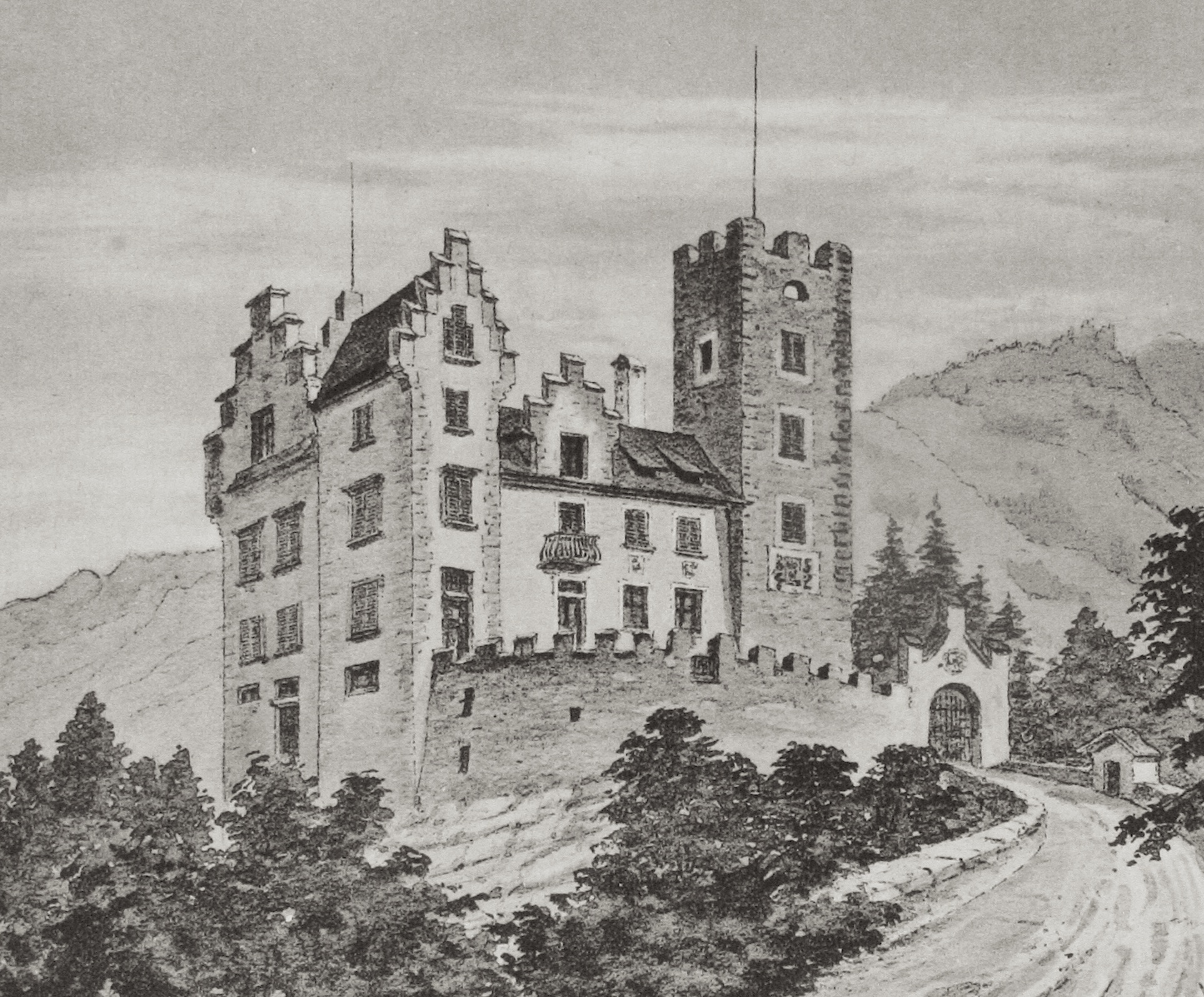
Baldenstein in 1878, after the fire

== Castle site ==
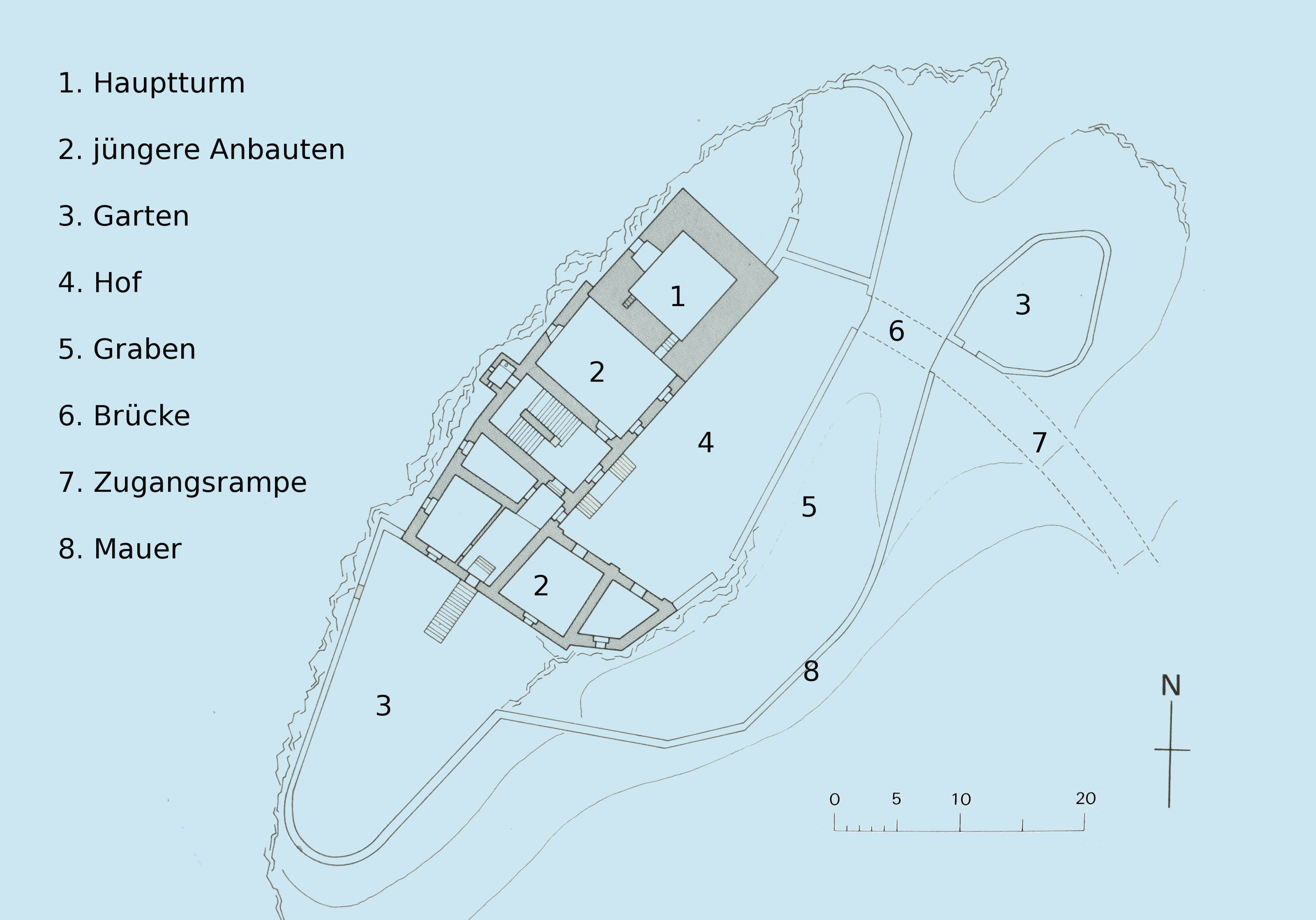
Plan of Baldenstein castle

The original tower is a four-story structure with walls that are up to 2.1 m (6.9 ft) thick. The residential wing has many Gothic Revival elements from the repairs following the 1877 fire. The tower-like avant-corps was topped with crow-stepped gables after the repairs. On the ground floor of the residence wing is a hall with a painted ceiling from the third quarter of the 17th century and a fireplace with the coat of arms of the Rosenroll and Ruinelli families. On the second floor there is a sideboard from 1677 and a painted oven from 1670.

== See also ==
- List of castles in Switzerland
