= Tavanasa =

Village in Switzerland

Coordinates: 46.754°N 9.062°E

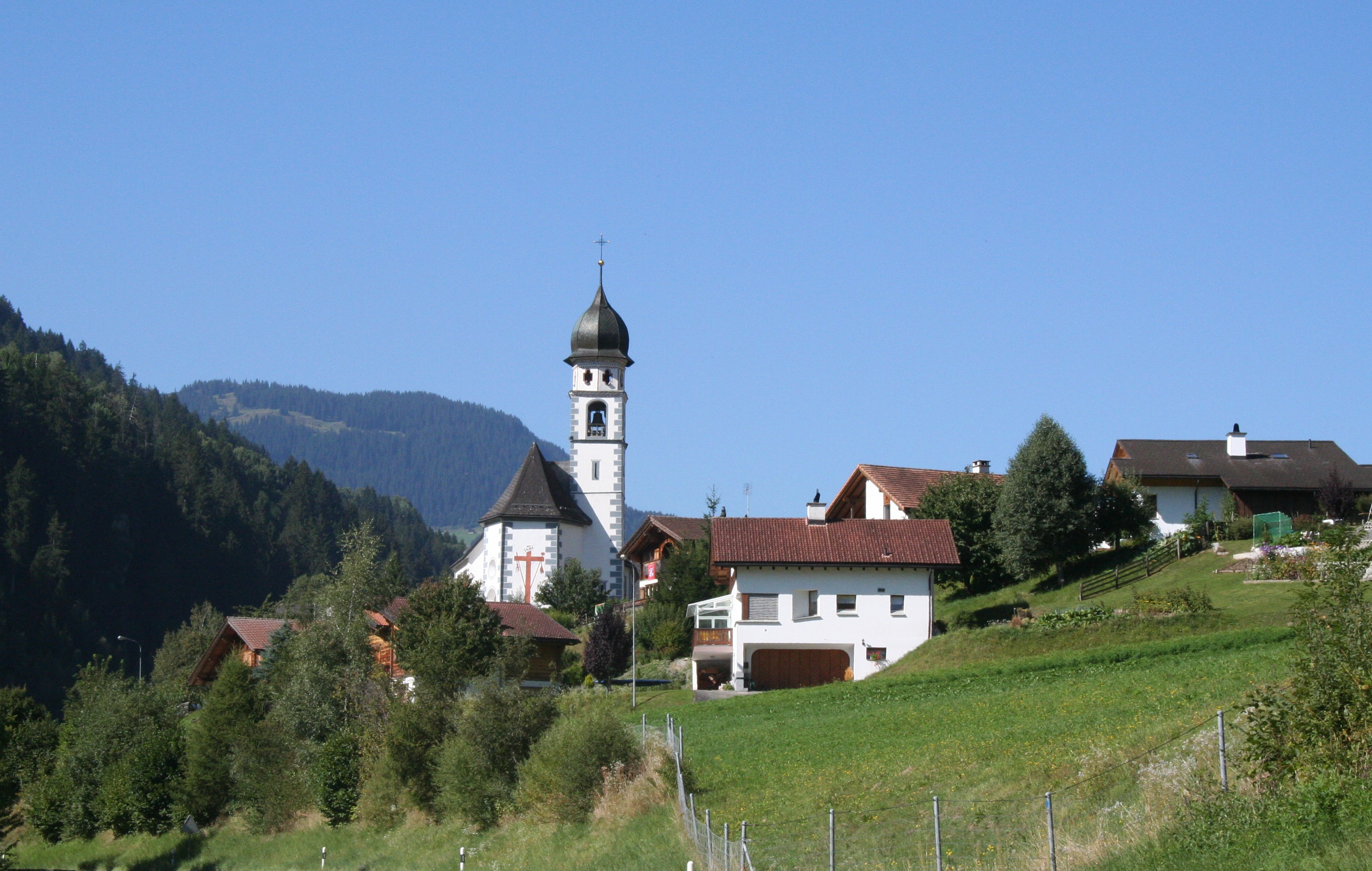
Tavanasa

Tavanasa lies in the municipality of Breil/Brigels, Graubünden, Switzerland. It has a station on the Disentis - Reichenau line of the Rhätische Bahn railway.

Tavanasa is a major sports activities area offering skiing in the winter and watersports along the Rhine in the summer.

The Tavanasa Bridge is a major crossing of the Rhine (Vorderrhein).

Aerial view (1957)
