= Rudenz Castle (Obwalden) =

Ruined castle in Switzerland

- Burgruine Rudenz
- Giswil-Rudenz
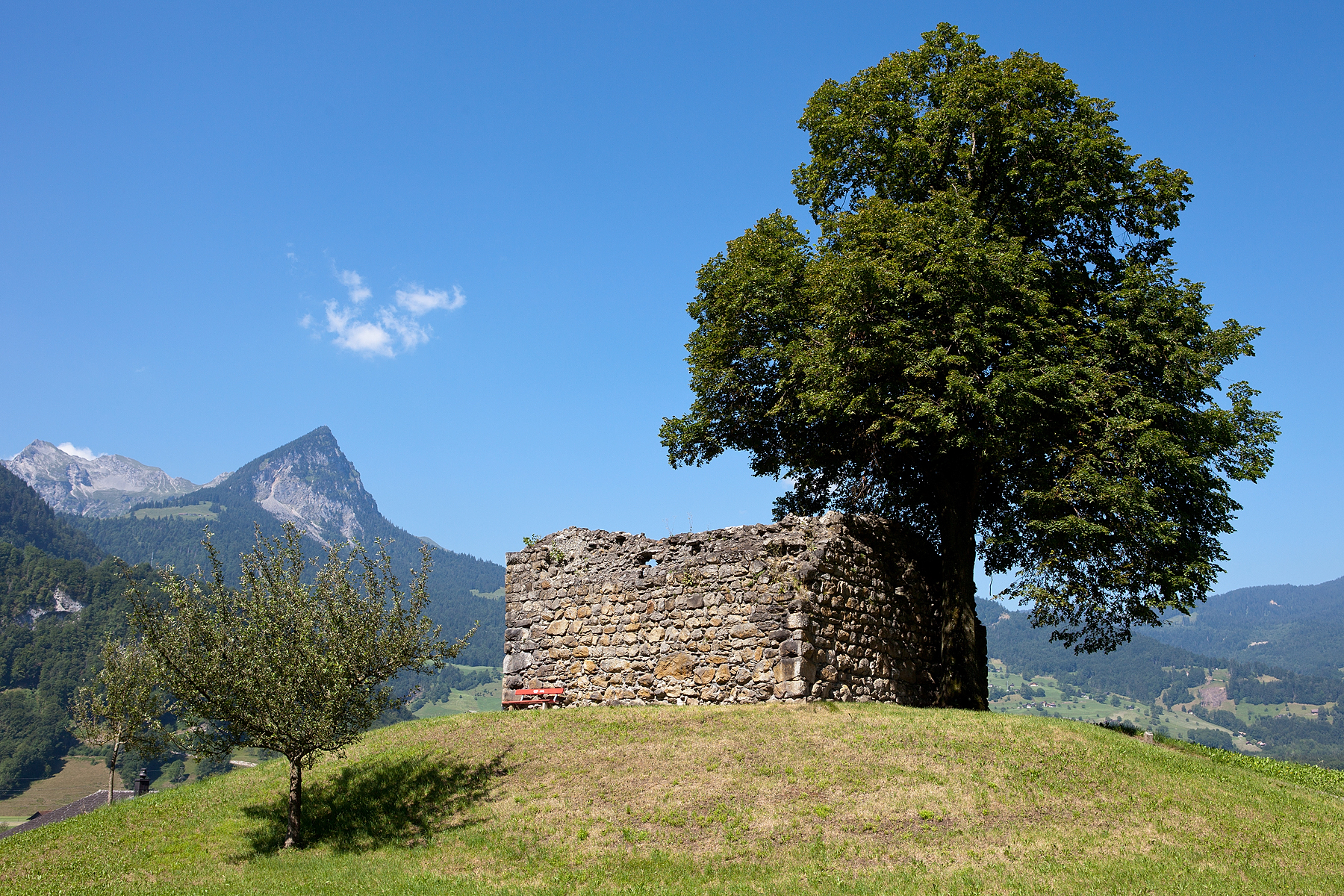
- The ruins of Rudenz Castle

Site information
- Type: hill castle, spur castle
- Code: CH-OW
- Condition: ruin

Location
- Coordinates: 46°49′57″N 8°11′04″E

Site history
- Built: 1200 to 1250

Garrison information
- Occupants: ministeriales

Rudenz Castle is a ruined castle atop a hill in the municipality of Giswil in the canton of Obwalden in Switzerland. The castle and surroundings are a Swiss heritage site of national significance.

== History ==
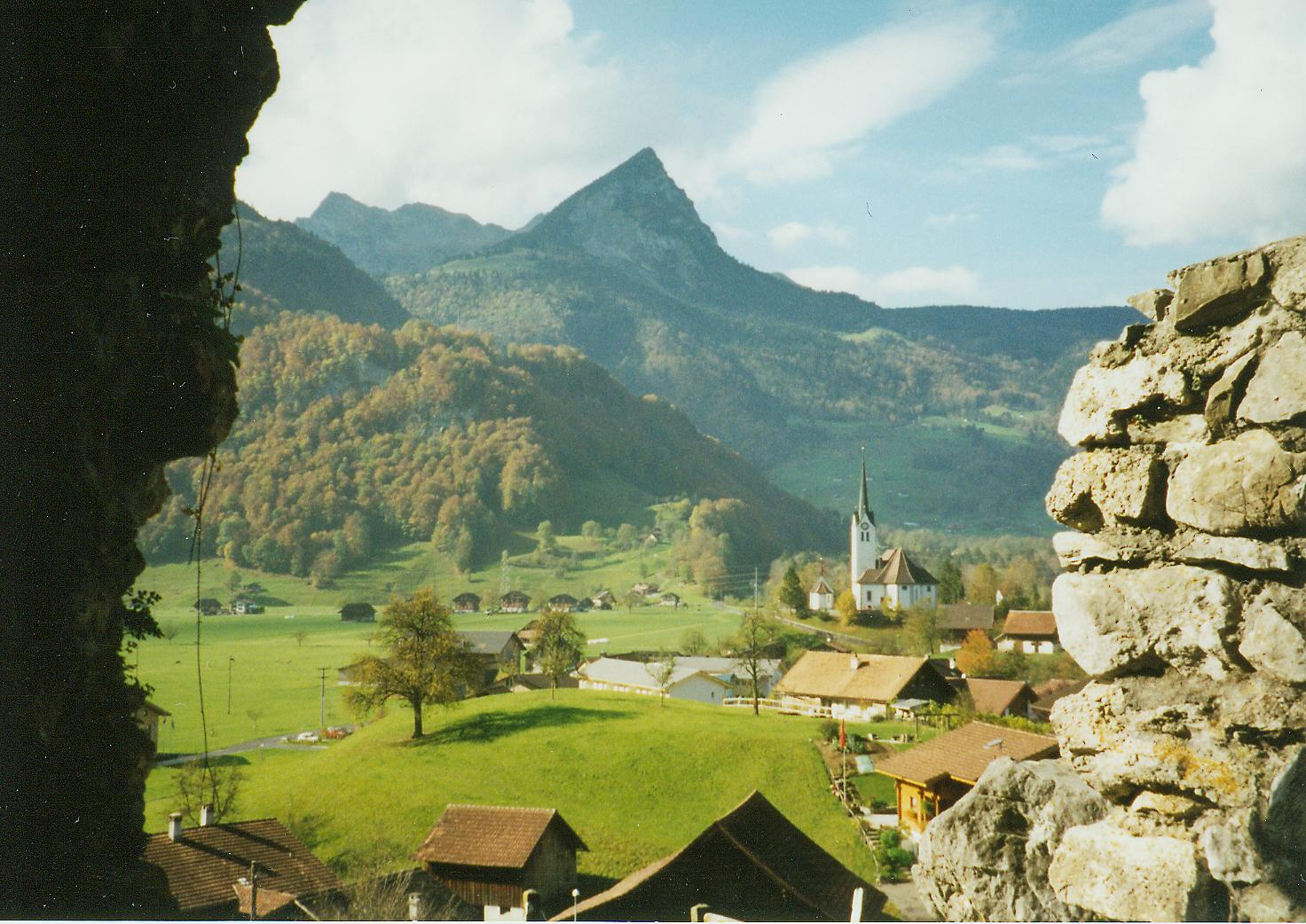
View from the castle ruins toward the parish church of St. Laurentius

Rudenz Castle is the easternmost of three ruined castles in Giswil. Traditionally thought to be part of a defensive line due to their proximity and that they lay in a straight line, they are now generally believed to be three separate castles built for different purposes. The westernmost, Rosenberg Castle was built by the bailiff of Murbach-Lucerne Abbey in 12th century. It lies about 2 km (1.2 mi) from Rudenz. The center castle, Hunwil Castle was completely demolished to provide stone for the parish church which was dedicated in 1635.

The Rudenz family were a knightly family in the Haslital in the Canton of Bern. They were in the service of the Freiherr of Brienz-Ringgenberg and around 1200 crossed over into Unterwalden, where they established the castle in Giswil. The Unterwalden branch of the family spread in central Switzerland, eventually marrying into local noble families, such as the Attinghausen, and acquiring Rudenz Castle in Uri. Eventually the family split into two separate branches, one in Bern and the other in central Switzerland. Under Johann II von Rudenz, the family's power reached its pinnacle. However, he was last of the Rudenz family, and with his death in 1383 the castle passed through the hands of several local noble families.

Very little is recorded about the castle after 1383. In 1478 the Landammann Heinrich Bürgler was mentioned as the castle owner. His son also owned it and probably lived there in 1501. The southwest entrance, which is still visible today, was probably added to the castle around this time. The castle continued to be occupied at least through the mid 16th century. At some point, the castle was abandoned and partially demolished, probably to provide building material.

In 1850 the ruins were excavated discovering arrows, lance tips and stirrups. Additional artifacts were discovered in 1887 during construction of the Brünig railway line near the castle. In 2008 the castle was cleaned and repaired and in 2010 it became the property of the Canton.

== Castle site ==
The castle is a slightly rectangular tower of about 10 m × 11 m (33 ft × 36 ft). The walls are up to 1.8 m (5.9 ft) thick and today stand no more than 5 m (16 ft) high. The original high entrance and wooden external stairways were both demolished. The low entrance was probably added in the early 16th century and is located on the south west corner.

== See also ==
List of castles and fortresses in Switzerland
