= Rosenberg Castle =

Rosenberg Castle may refer to:

- Burgruine Hohenburg auf Rosenberg, a ruined castle in Austria
- Rosenberg Castle (Appenzell), a ruined castle in Appenzell, Switzerland
- Rosenberg Castle (Berneck), a ruined castle in Berneck, Switzerland
- Rosenberg Castle (Obwalden), a ruined castle in Giswil, Switzerland
- Rosenburg Castle (Ramsenberg), a ruined castle in Herisau, Switzerland
- Rožmberk Castle, a castle in the Czech Republic
- Rosenberg Estate, a manor house in Hombrechtikon, Switzerland
