= Schweinsberg Castle =

- Schweinsberghaus
- Attinghausen, Uri in Switzerland
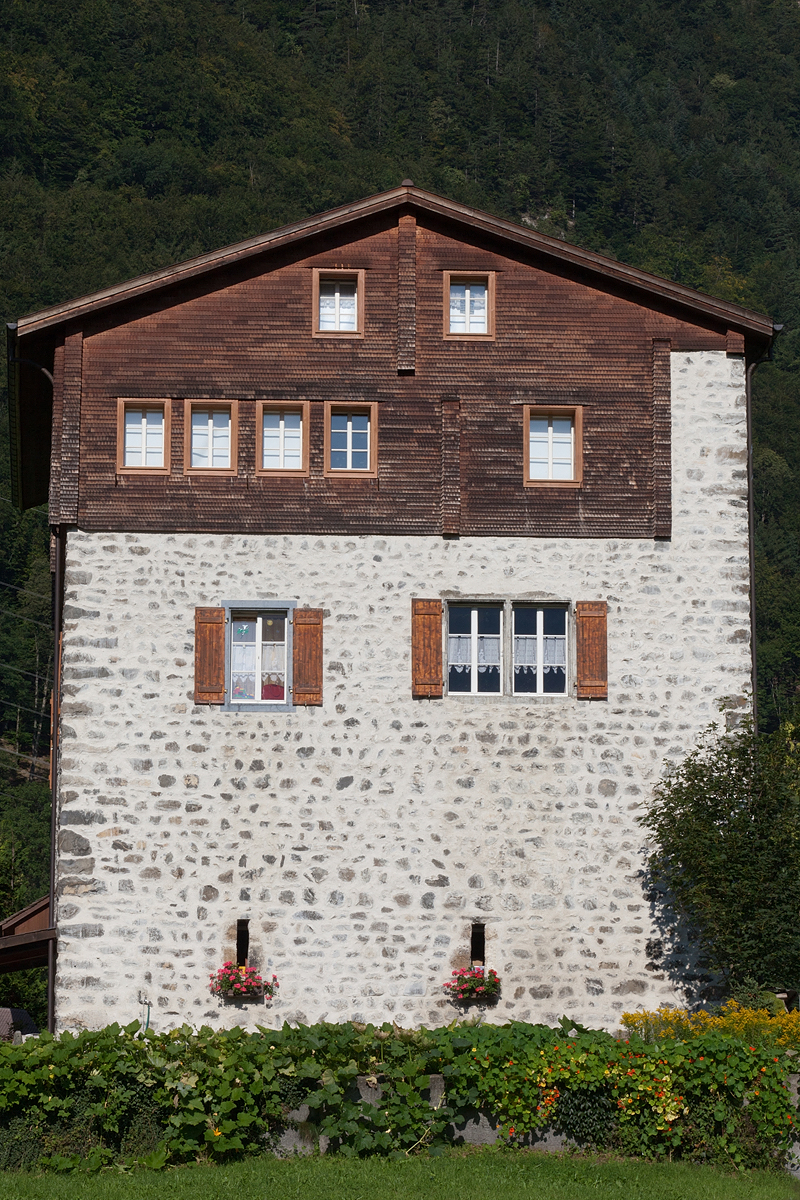

Site information
- Condition: Inhabited

Location
- Location within Switzerland
- Coordinates: 46°51′51″N 8°37′34″E

Site history
- Built: 13th century
- Built by: Knights of Schweinsberg
- Materials: Stone and wood

Schweinsberg Castle or Schweinsberghaus is a fortified house in the municipality of Attinghausen in the canton of Uri in Switzerland. It is a Swiss heritage site of national significance.

== History ==
The Freiherr von Schweinsberg first appears in documents in the 13th century at Wartenstein Castle in the Bernese Emmental. But a branch of the family was in Uri by the mid 13th century and occupied the castle, sometimes adopting the castle's name as their family name. By 1300 there were two branches, one under Werner II who held the lands in Uri and another under Diethelm I in the Berner Oberland. The Uri branch of the family is traditionally believed to have been critical supporters of the Three Forest Cantons and the early Swiss Confederacy. Werner II and his son Johann were the Landammann of Uri from 1294 until 1358/59. It is unknown what role, if any, Werner played at the Battle of Morgarten in 1315, but in 1339 Johann led the army of Uri at the Battle of Laupen.

The Schweinsberg/Attinghausen family owned Attinghausen Castle in the 13th century. As their fortunes grew in Uri, they built a second castle, Schweinsberg, a short distance north of Attinghausen later in the 13th century. The castle was probably built as a residence for knights in the service of the Freiherr of Attinghausen/Schweinsberg. Very little is known of the early history of the castle, though much of it is tied with the fortunes of the Attinghausen/Schweinsberg family.

On 1 May 1351, Rudolf Brun of Zurich and Johans von Attinghausen signed an alliance that brought Zurich into the growing Swiss Confederation. In 1353 they received the a fief that included the Imperial customs post at the Castle of Rudenz and became the Rector over Valais. However, in 1358 Johann died. Traditionally, it was believed that he died during an insurrection, which also destroyed the castle. However, more recent research indicates that he might have died of disease or while marching with his army. Johann's son, Jacob, was with the Pope in Avignon, but did not return to Uri or died while returning. Two of his cousins, Werner and Johann von Simpeln probably took over the Attinghausen lands and Attinghausen Castle in 1359. However, they both died soon thereafter, either of disease or in the 1360 fire that destroyed the castle. The Lords of Rudenz then inherited the Attinghausen lands and Schweinsberg Castle passed through a number of owners.

In the 16th century the castle was owned by the Zick family of Attinghausen. In 1617 it was given to Lieutenant Pompeus Tresch as a reward for his valor in battle. Following the Tresch family, it was owned by Johann Jakob von Beroldingen. At some point in its history it may have been owned by Attinghausen Nunnery. After passing through a number of other owners, in the late 19th century the Tresch family reacquired the castle and continue to own it to the present.

== Castle site ==
The castle is a rectangular tower of irregular, unfinished stone. The upper most level is partially wooden with stone walls reaching the roof on two and a half sides. It is about 14 m × 10.5 m (46 ft × 34 ft) and 11 m (36 ft) high. The walls at ground level are between 1.4–1.6 m (4.6–5.2 ft) thick. Inside the tower is another stone wall, running parallel to the west wall, that reaches to the roof. This wall, together with the upper level stone walls creates a fortified inner room of about 4 m × 4.6 m (13 ft × 15 ft). The original entrance was located part way up the tower on the north side and was reached by a wooden staircase. Today the main entrance is on the south at ground level and the high entrance is a window. The tower was probably surrounded by a wall and ditch, though no traces of either remain.

The ground floor was used for storage. The next floor was the original entrance and was used as a great hall. It was decorated with murals of the Crucifixion and hunting scenes that were painted around 1480. Unfortunately, many of these murals have mostly deteriorated, and the room is now used as a kitchen.

== See also ==
List of castles and fortresses in Switzerland
