= List of cultural property of national significance in Switzerland: Appenzell Ausserrhoden =

This list contains all cultural property of national significance (class A) in the canton of Appenzell Ausserrhoden from the 2009 Swiss Inventory of Cultural Property of National and Regional Significance. It is sorted by municipality.

The geographic coordinates provided are in the Swiss coordinate system as given in the Inventory.

== Gais ==
KGS No.^{?}	Picture	Name	Street Address	CH1903 X coordinate	CH1903 Y coordinate	Location
9909	Farm House	Farm House	Ballmoos 747	754.878	247.799	47.362824°N 9.489079°E
411	Former Merchant's House, Haus Gruber	Former Merchant's House, Haus Gruber	Schwantlern 5	752.300	247.757	47.363048°N 9.454949°E
408	Gasthof Krone	Gasthof Krone	Dorfplatz 6	752.197	247.698	47.362541°N 9.453565°E
9908	Gasthaus zum Falken	Gasthaus zum Falken	Dorfplatz 15	752.286	247.719	47.362709°N 9.45475°E
407	Haus zum Neuen Ochsen	Haus zum Neuen Ochsen	Dorfplatz 14	752.270	247.732	47.36283°N 9.454543°E
409	Reformed Church	Reformed Church	Dorfplatz	752.292	247.671	47.362276°N 9.454813°E
Unknown		ISOS Village: Gais				

== Heiden ==
KGS No.^{?}	Picture	Name	Street Address	CH1903 X coordinate	CH1903 Y coordinate	Location
9164		Konzernarchiv Sefar	Hinterbissaustrasse 25	757.992	256.211	47.437718°N 9.533258°E
9031	Schwimm- and Sonnenbad (Swimming Pool)	Schwimm- and Sonnenbad (Swimming Pool)	Kohlplatz 967	758.100	256.707	47.442152°N 9.534865°E
Unknown		ISOS Spezialfall: Heiden				

== Herisau ==
KGS No.^{?}	Picture	Name	Street Address	CH1903 X coordinate	CH1903 Y coordinate	Location
10418	Old Rathaus (Town council house)	Old Rathaus (Town council house)	Schwänberg 2683	735.958	250.825	47.394209°N 9.239605°E
460	Railroad Bridge SOB (shared with St Gallen)	Railroad Bridge SOB (shared with St Gallen)		742.388	251.672	47.400466°N 9.325019°E
8500	Historisches Museum	Historisches Museum	Platz	738.945	249.935	47.385583°N 9.278882°E
435	Cantonal Administration Building	Cantonal Administration Building	Obstmarkt 3	739.016	249.914	47.385379°N 9.279816°E
434	Reformed Church	Reformed Church	Platz	738.980	249.980	47.38598°N 9.27936°E
443	Ruins of Rosenberg or Ramsenberg Castle	Ruins of Rosenberg or Ramsenberg Castle		737.090	250.210	47.388444°N 9.254407°E
11802	Rutenkamin House	Rutenkamin House	Schwänberg	735.920	250.730	47.393362°N 9.239073°E
9037	Schwarzes Haus	Schwarzes Haus	Cilanderstrasse 5	738.539	249.968	47.385965°N 9.273517°E
8787	Archives of Appenzell Ausserrhoden	Archives of Appenzell Ausserrhoden	Obstmarkt 1	739.067	249.938	47.385584°N 9.280498°E
459	Urnäschbrücke im Kubel (Bridge, Shared with Stein)	Urnäschbrücke im Kubel (Bridge, Shared with Stein)	Sturzenegg / Weitenau	742.510	251.615	47.399927°N 9.326616°E
445	Walsersches Doppelhaus	Walsersches Doppelhaus	Platz 1	738.951	249.997	47.386139°N 9.278981°E
432	Wetterhaus	Wetterhaus	Platz 12	738.931	249.944	47.385667°N 9.2787°E
9094	Zeughaus Ebnet	Zeughaus Ebnet	Schützenstrasse 1	739.089	250.244	47.388331°N 9.280885°E
Unknown		ISOS Verstädtertes Village: Herisau				
Unknown		ISOS hamlet: Schwänberg				

== Hundwil ==
KGS No.^{?}	Picture	Name	Street Address	CH1903 X coordinate	CH1903 Y coordinate	Location
Unknown		ISOS Village: Hundwil				

== Lutzenberg ==
KGS No.^{?}	Picture	Name	Street Address	CH1903 X coordinate	CH1903 Y coordinate	Location
Unknown		ISOS hamlet: Tobel				

== Schwellbrunn ==
KGS No.^{?}	Picture	Name	Street Address	CH1903 X coordinate	CH1903 Y coordinate	Location
Unknown		ISOS Village: Schwellbrunn				

== Speicher ==
KGS No.^{?}	Picture	Name	Street Address	CH1903 X coordinate	CH1903 Y coordinate	Location
491	Former Zuberbühler House	Former Zuberbühler House	Oberdorf 2	751.103	253.123	47.411571°N 9.44092°E

== Stein ==
KGS No.^{?}	Picture	Name	Street Address	CH1903 X coordinate	CH1903 Y coordinate	Location
8572	Appenzeller Volkskunde-Museum (Appenzell Folklore Museum)	Appenzeller Volkskunde-Museum (Appenzell Folklore Museum)	Village 821	743.941	248.647	47.372929°N 9.344612°E
10495	Eisensteg Zweibruggen (Bridge, Shared with St. Gallen)	Eisensteg Zweibruggen (Bridge, Shared with St. Gallen)	Haggenstrasse	743.472	251.626	47.399817°N 9.33936°E
10511	Gmündertobel bridge (shared with Teufen)	Gmündertobel bridge (shared with Teufen)		744.161	250.304	47.38778°N 9.348058°E
10513	Urnäschbrücke im Kubel (Bridge, Shared with Herisau)	Urnäschbrücke im Kubel (Bridge, Shared with Herisau)	Weitenau / Sturzenegg	742.510	251.615	47.399927°N 9.326616°E

== Teufen ==
KGS No.^{?}	Picture	Name	Street Address	CH1903 X coordinate	CH1903 Y coordinate	Location
9074	Gmündertobel-Bridge (Shared With Stein)	Gmündertobel-Bridge (Shared With Stein)		744.156	250.307	47.387808°N 9.347993°E

== Trogen ==
KGS No.^{?}	Picture	Name	Street Address	CH1903 X coordinate	CH1903 Y coordinate	Location
537	Former Haus Tobler Am Berg	Former Haus Tobler Am Berg	Bergweg 1	752.867	252.724	47.407576°N 9.464149°E
532	Former Haus Zellweger Nr. 4	Former Haus Zellweger Nr. 4	Landsgemeindeplatz 4	752.972	252.778	47.408037°N 9.465558°E
544	Former Mädchenkonvikt	Former Mädchenkonvikt	Landsgemeindeplatz 10	752.876	252.751	47.407817°N 9.464277°E
529	Fünfeckpalast	Fünfeckpalast	Landsgemeindeplatz 7	752.867	252.795	47.408214°N 9.464173°E
536	Gasthaus zur Krone	Gasthaus zur Krone	Landsgemeindeplatz 3	752.963	252.764	47.407913°N 9.465434°E
525; 9323	Pfarr- and Gemeindehaus (Former Lord's House) with Cantonal Library Appenzell Ausserrhoden	Pfarr- and Gemeindehaus (Former Lord's House) with Cantonal Library Appenzell Ausserrhoden	Landsgemeindeplatz 1	752.934	252.736	47.407668°N 9.46504°E
527	Rathaus (Town council house)	Rathaus (Town council house)	Landsgemeindeplatz 2	752.949	252.753	47.407818°N 9.465245°E
526	Reformed Church	Reformed Church	Landsgemeindeplatz	752.958	252.802	47.408256°N 9.465381°E
545	Sonnenhof	Sonnenhof	Bühlerstrasse 1	752.910	252.688	47.407242°N 9.464706°E
528	Zellwegerscher Doppelpalast	Zellwegerscher Doppelpalast	Landsgemeindeplatz 5	752.929	252.794	47.408191°N 9.464994°E
Unknown		ISOS Village: Trogen				

== Urnäsch ==
KGS No.^{?}	Picture	Name	Street Address	CH1903 X coordinate	CH1903 Y coordinate	Location
8507	Appenzeller Brauchtumsmuseum (Traditional Life Museum)	Appenzeller Brauchtumsmuseum (Traditional Life Museum)	Villageplatz	739.420	242.358	47.317351°N 9.282813°E
552	House with a Mill	House with a Mill	Müllstatt 1017	740.146	243.611	47.328464°N 9.292804°E
Unknown		ISOS Village: Urnäsch				

== Wolfhalden ==
KGS No.^{?}	Picture	Name	Street Address	CH1903 X coordinate	CH1903 Y coordinate	Location
571		Alte Mühle Wolfhalden	Tobel 131	758.313	257.004	47.444771°N 9.537793°E
