= Wartenstein Castle =

Wartenstein Castle may refer to castles in:

Germany

- Wartenstein Castle (Germany), former castle, now a schloss, near Kirn, county of Bad Kreuznach, Rhineland-Palatinate

Switzerland

- Wartenstein Castle (St Gallen), castle in Pfäfers in the canton of St. Gallen
- Wartenstein Castle (Bern), castle ruins in Lauperswil in the canton of Bern
