= Burgseeli =

Lake in canton of Bern, Switzerland

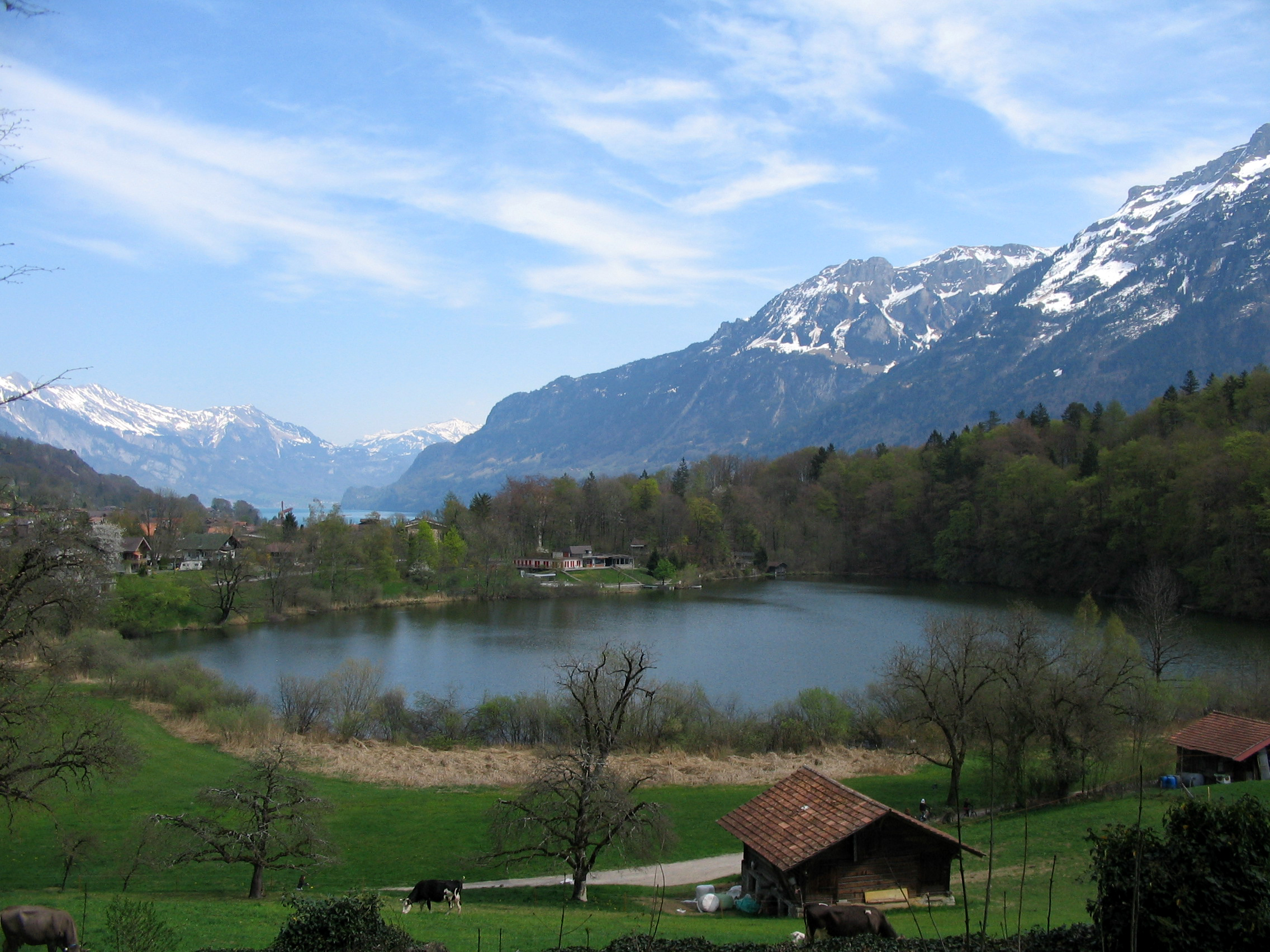

- Location within Canton of Bern Location within Switzerland Location within Alps
- Interactive map of Burgseeli
- Location: Ringgenberg, Canton of Bern
- Coordinates: 46°41′52″N 7°53′08″E
- Catchment area: 0.717 km^{2} (0.277 sq mi)
- Basin countries: Switzerland
- Max. length: 220 m (720 ft)
- Max. width: 280 m (920 ft)
- Surface area: 5.25 ha (13.0 acres)
- Max. depth: 19.1 m (63 ft)
- Surface elevation: 613 m (2,011 ft)

Burgseeli (or Burgseewli) is a lake in the canton of Bern, Switzerland. Its surface area is 5.25 ha. It is located between Ringgenberg and Goldswil on the northern shore of Lake Brienz. Swimming is possible at a bathing beach. Given its relatively small size temperatures up to 26 °C are reached.
