= Attinghausen Castle =

Ruined medieval castle in Attinghausen, Switzerland

- Burgruine Attinghausen
- Attinghausen, Uri in Switzerland
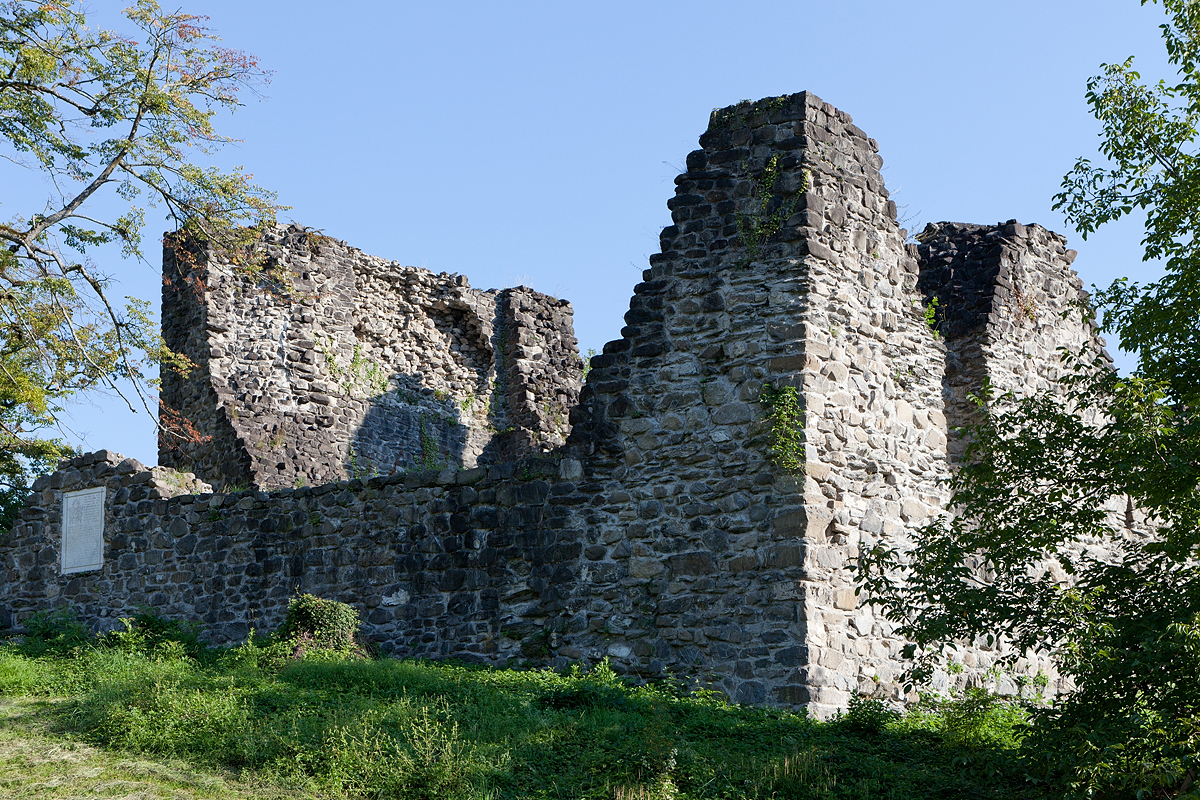

Site information
- Condition: ruined

Location
- Location within Canton of Uri Location within Switzerland
- Coordinates: 46°51′44″N 8°37′47″E

Site history
- Built: before 1100
- Materials: Stone

Attinghausen Castle is a ruined medieval castle in the municipality of Attinghausen in the canton of Uri in Switzerland. It is a Swiss heritage site of national significance.

== History ==
The first castle was built before 1100 on a hill in the middle of the village of Attinghausen. Virtually nothing is known about the first owners of the castle, although they were probably knights in the service of the Counts of Zähringen and they may have used the name von Attinghausen. By the 13th century, the original owners were gone from the castle and the von Schweinsberg family had come to own it, possibly through Ulrich von Schweinsberg marrying a daughter of the original Attinghausens. The original castle was probably a Motte-and-bailey castle which was spread across the hilltop.

The Freiherr von Schweinsberg first appears in documents in the 13th century from Wartenstein Castle in the Bernese Emmental. But a branch of the family was in Uri by the mid-13th century and had then occupied the castle, sometimes adopting the castle's name as their family name. They also built Schweinsberg Castle a short distance north of Attinghausen. By 1300, there were two branches: one under Werner II who held the lands in Uri, and another under Diethelm I in the Berner Oberland. The Uri branch of the family is traditionally believed to have been critical supporters of the Three Forest Cantons and the early Swiss Confederacy. Werner II and his son Johann were the Landammann of Uri from 1294 until 1358/59. It is unknown what role, if any, Werner played at the Battle of Morgarten in 1315, but in 1339 Johann led the army of Uri at the Battle of Laupen.

The Schweinsberg/Attinghausens replaced the original fortifications with an 11 by 11 meters (36 ft × 36 ft) square tower and a ring wall. The main entrance into the tower was via a wooden staircase to the second or third level. The gatehouse was in the western wall. A massive wooden structure was built on the southern side of the ring wall. Around 1300, the wooden building was replaced with a large stone residential building, which may have had stables and granaries on the ground floor and bedrooms above. The family's wealth and influence continued to rise, and on 1 May 1351, Rudolf Brun of Zurich and Johann von Attinghausen signed an alliance that brought Zurich into the growing Swiss Confederation. In 1353 Johann received a fief that included the Imperial customs post at the Castle of Rudenz and he became the Rector over Valais. Johann died in 1358. Traditionally, it was believed that he died during an insurrection, which also destroyed the castle. However, more recent research indicates that he might have died of disease or while marching with his army.

Johann's son, Jacob, was with the Pope in Avignon, but either did not return to Uri or died while returning. Two of his cousins, Werner and Johann von Simpeln, probably took over the Attinghausen lands and the castle in 1359. However, they both died soon thereafter, either from disease or in the 1360 fire that destroyed the castle. The Lords of Rudenz then inherited the Attinghausen lands, but could not afford to rebuild the castle. Instead they settled in Rudenz Castle in Flüelen and Attinghausen castle was abandoned.

In 1894 the castle ruins were first excavated and in 1896 they were sold to the Historical Society of Uri. In 1979 an archeological investigation of the ruins discovered numerous artifacts from the castle's residents. By 2007, the ruins were unsafe and the Historical Society closed them to the public. Through donations from the public they raised enough money to thoroughly investigate, document and repair the castle ruins. In 2012 the ruins reopened to the public.

== See also ==
List of castles and fortresses in Switzerland
