= Rosenberg Castle (Obwalden) =

Castle in Switzerland

- Burgruine Rosenberg
- Giswil-Kleinteil
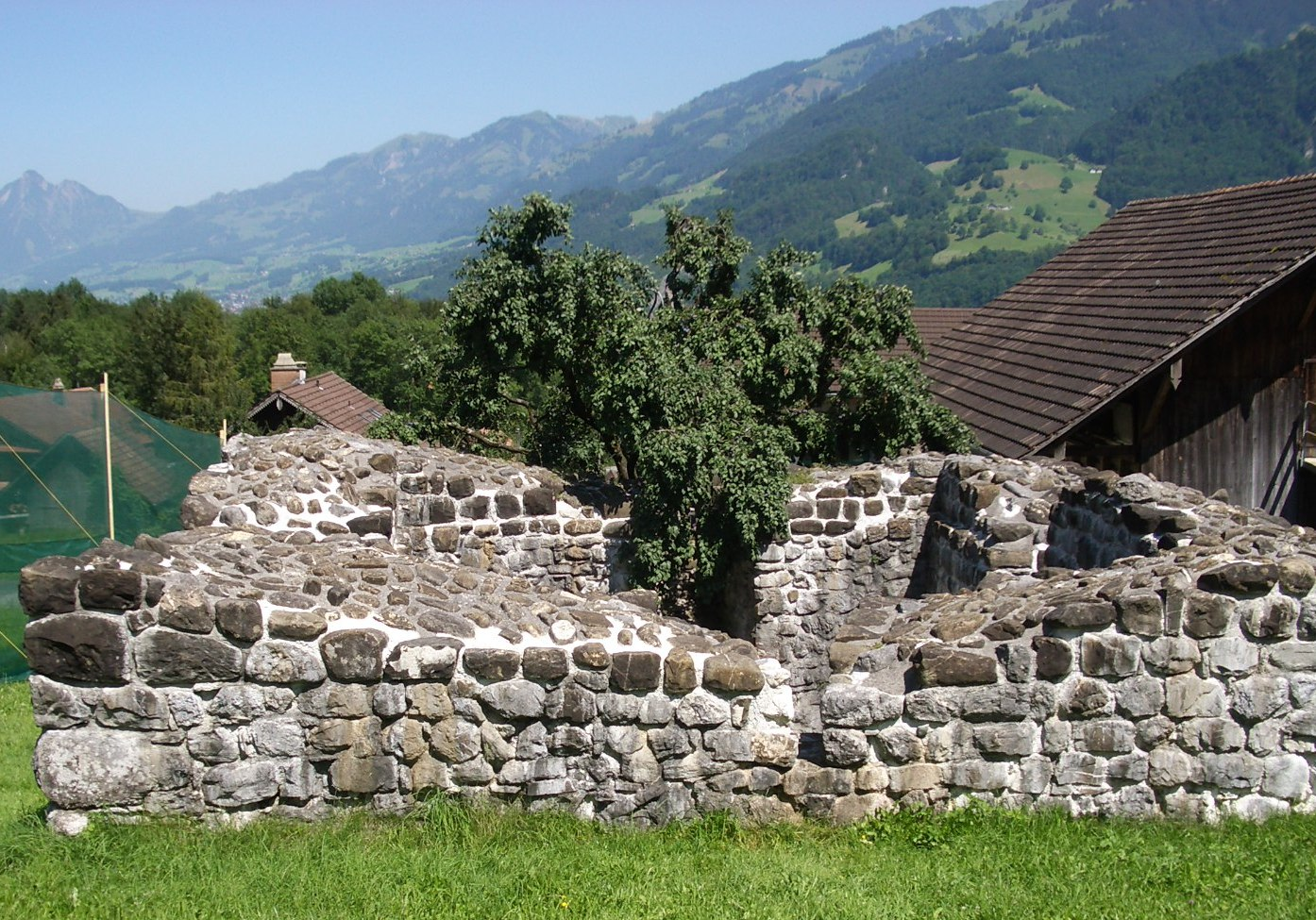
- The ruins of Rosenberg Castle

Site information
- Code: CH-OW
- Condition: ruin

Location
- Location within Switzerland
- Coordinates: 46°49′55.4″N 8°9′19.82″E
- Height: 554 m above the sea

Site history
- Built: 13th century

Garrison information
- Occupants: Bailiff

Rosenberg Castle is a ruined castle in the municipality of Giswil in the canton of Obwalden in Switzerland.

== History ==
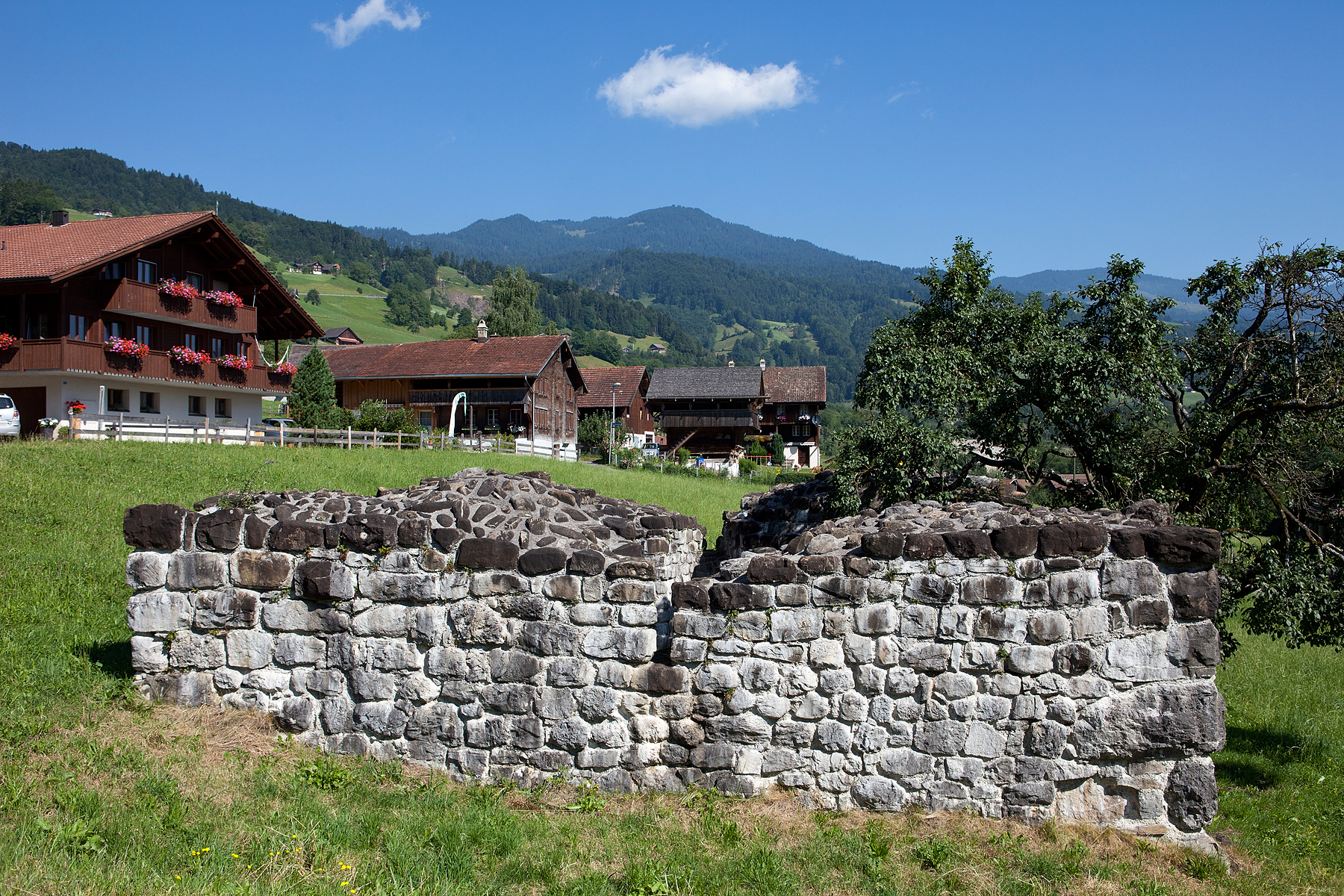
The ruins of Rosenberg in the Kleinteil region of Giswil.

Rosenberg Castle is the westernmost of three ruined castles in Giswil. Traditionally thought to be part of a defensive line due to their proximity and that they lay in a straight line, they are now generally believed to be three separate castles built for different purposes. The easternmost, Rudenz Castle was built by the Knights of Rudenz in the early 13th century. It lies about 2 km (1.2 mi) from Rosenberg. The center castle, Hunwil Castle was completely demolished to provide stone for the parish church which was dedicated in 1635.

The village of Giswil was a fief of Murbach-Lucerne Abbey in the 9th century. An ecclesiastical bailiff administered the Abbey's lands and had a residence somewhere in the village. By the 12th century, the bailiff had a stone building on the castle site. It was demolished and replaced with a tower house in the 13th century. The tower was probably surrounded by a ring wall and ditch, though no traces remain.

In 1291 the Habsburgs bought the town of Lucerne and the Unterwalden estates, including Giswil, from Murbach Abbey. The Habsburgs appointed one of their vassals as the bailiff, probably making it a hereditary office. The last member of this vassal family is mentioned in 1347 as Mathis the Meier von Giswil. After his death, the office passed to the Rudenz family, who already owned a castle and estates in Giswil. A few years later, in 1361, the Rudenz family had to give Rosenberg to Landammann of Obwalden George von Hunwil, who began building Hunwil Castle. In 1382, George von Hunwil was forced to leave Obwalden for Lucerne. In 1387 Jenni von Wennishusen was the bailiff over the village, living in either Rosenberg or Hunwil Castles. Around 1400 the parish of Giswil bought the former ecclesiastical lands and Rosenberg Castle lost its importance as the center of those lands.

The castle was mentioned as destroyed in a record from 1532. In 1664-67 the chapel of St. Anthony of Padua was built near the ruins. During the 17th century, the name Rosenberg started to be used for the castle ruins. By 1900 only an overgrown mound remained of the castle. In 1935 the castle site was purchased by the Canton and in the following year it was excavated, cleaned and repaired. A small archeological expedition in 1990 found a few artifacts and traces of the 12th century stone building.

== Castle site ==
The castle is a square stone tower of about 9.3 m × 9.3 m (31 ft × 31 ft). The walls are up to 2 m (6.6 ft) thick and are up to 3 m (9.8 ft) high. The large window openings are visible at the top of the remaining walls.

== See also ==
- List of castles and fortresses in Switzerland
