= Rosenberg Castle (Appenzell) =

Castle ruins Herisau, Appenzell Ausserrhoden, Switzerland

- Ruine Rosenberg
- Herisau-Burghalden
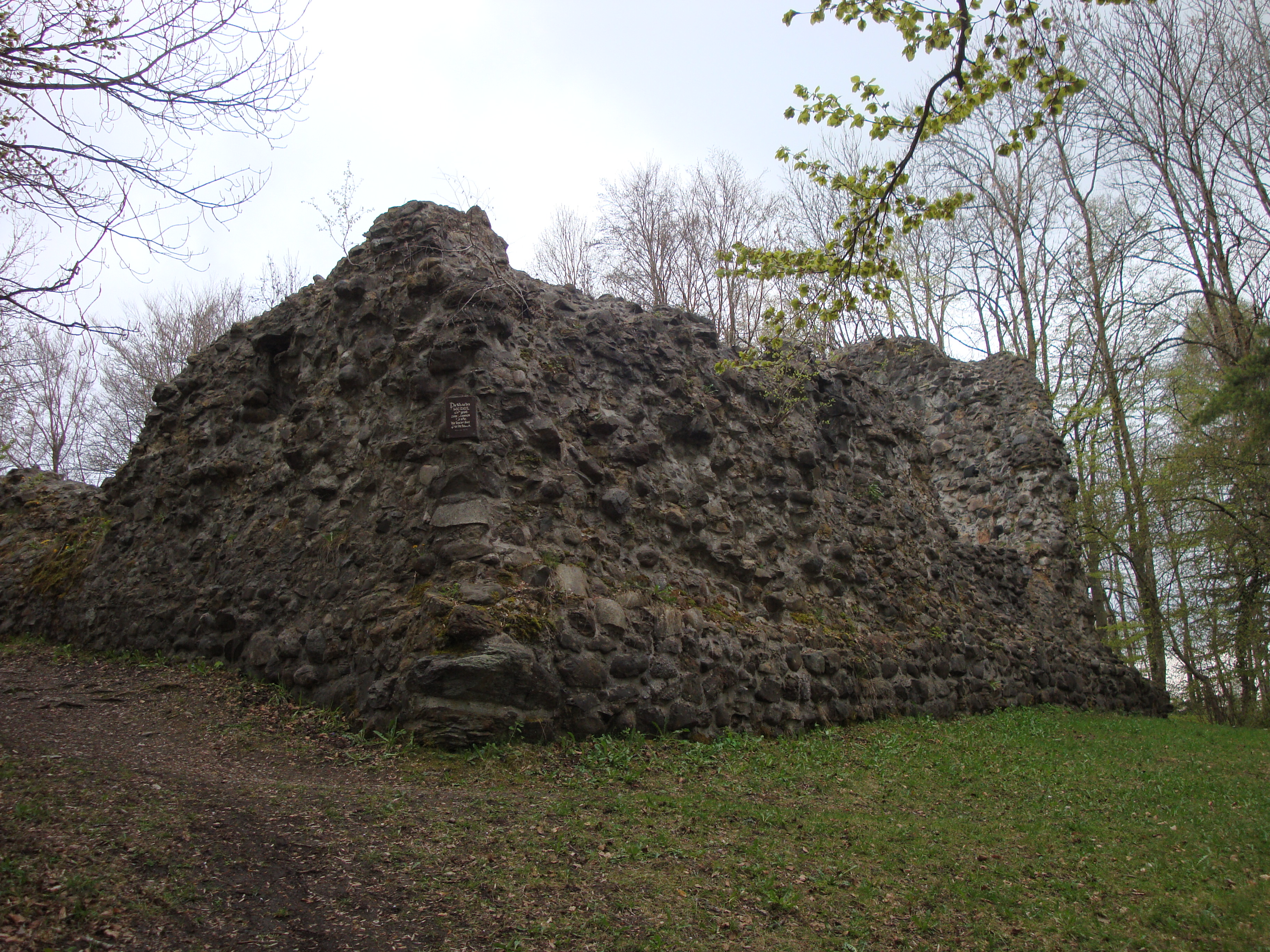
- Ruins of Rosenberg castle

Site information
- Type: hill castle
- Code: CH-AR
- Condition: ruin

Location
- Coordinates: 47°23′47″N 9°16′55″E

Site history
- Built: about 1150

Rosenberg Castle is a ruined castle located near the villages of Burghalden and Schachen to the north of the municipality of Herisau in the canton of Appenzell Ausserrhoden in Switzerland.

== History ==
In 1176 the noble family of Rorschach first appeared in the record as knights in service to the Abbot of St. Gall. Over the following centuries this family owned a number of castles and produced many separate lines, all of which used a rose bush somewhere in their coat of arms. Around 1200 they built two castles near Herisau, one called Rosenberg, the other Rosenburg and about 2.3 km (1.4 mi) apart. Rosenburg Castle was located near the Ramsenstock, a small mountain with a peak 926 m (3,038 ft) above sea level, and is therefore also known as Ramsenberg.

The first owner of the castle, Egolf von Rorschach, took the name von Rosenberg after the castle was finished. After his death in 1222, his family continued to use the Rosenberg name. The Rosenbergs remained in service to the Abbot and in 1271 Abbot Berchtold von Falkenstein and 70 of his knights celebrated Christmas at Rosenberg.

When the citizens of Appenzell rebelled against the Abbot in the early 15th century, Rosenberg was one of their first targets. In 1403 the castle was attacked and burned, probably never to be rebuilt. In 1415 Rudolf von Rosenberg gave his half of the castle and estates to the Heiliggeistspital (Holy Ghost Hospital) in St. Gallen, while his sisters Margaret and Ursula sold their half to Herisau. By 1461 the entire ruined castle and surrounding lands were owned by Abbey of St. Gall, which they held until the upheavals of the Helvetic Republic and Act of Mediation in 1803. The ruins passed from the Abbey to the Canton of Appenzell Ausserrhoden and they in turn sold it to a private owner in 1805. The ruins were excavated, stabilized and repaired in 1936/37 and today are owned by Herisau. During the 1936/37 excavation a number of weapons, iron tools and tiles were discovered.

== Castle site ==
The castle is built on the eastern crown of a small hill above the village of Burghalden. There were probably storage and production buildings on the western crown, though only traces remain. On the eastern side was a palas-like main tower. The tower was 19 m × 20 m (62 ft × 66 ft) and had walls that were up to 3.2 m (10 ft) thick at the bottom. There was a wall that ran from the north-west corner of the tower northward, but nothing remains of it. The original entrance was probably located on the south-west side, but during the 14th century the castle was expanded and renovated. The old entrance, which required climbing to enter, was replaced with a new, ground level gate on the south side.

== See also ==
- List of castles and fortresses in Switzerland
