= Ringgenberg =

- Municipality
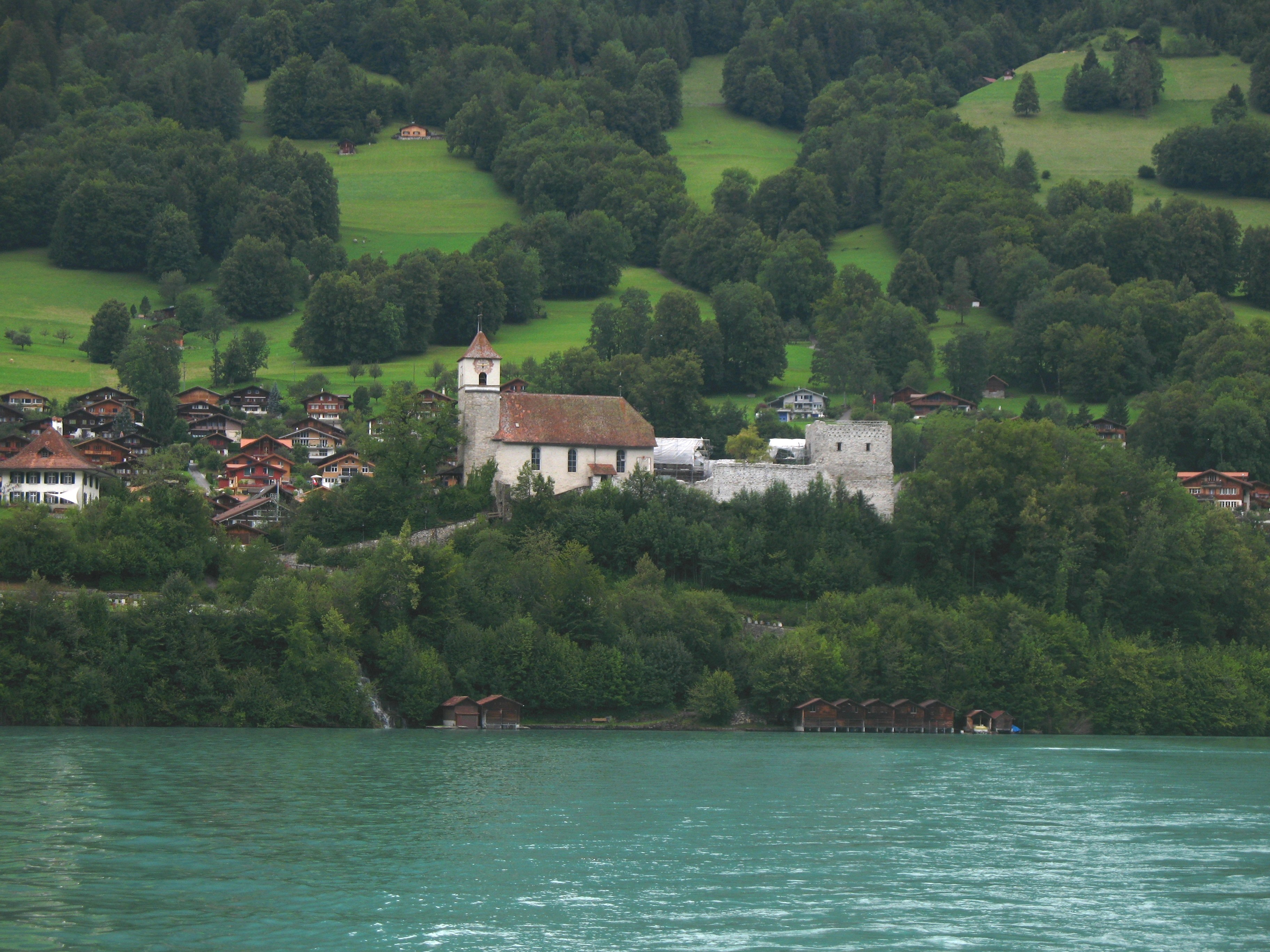

- Flag Coat of arms
- Location of Ringgenberg
- Location within Switzerland Location within Canton of Bern
- Coordinates: 46°42′N 7°54′E
- Country: Switzerland
- Canton: Bern
- District: Interlaken-Oberhasli

Government
  - Executive: Gemeinderat with 7 members
  - Mayor: Gemeindepräsident(in); Adrian Weinekötter (as of 2026)

Area
  - Total: 8.7 km^{2} (3.4 sq mi)
- Elevation: 1,103 m (3,619 ft)

Population (December 2020)
  - Total: 2,588
  - Density: 300/km^{2} (770/sq mi)
- Time zone: UTC+01:00 (CET)
  - Summer (DST): UTC+02:00 (CEST)
- Postal code: 3852
- SFOS number: 590
- ISO 3166 code: CH-BE
- Localities: Ringgenberg, Goldswil
- Surrounded by: Bönigen, Habkern, Interlaken, Niederried bei Interlaken, Unterseen
- Website: https://www.ringgenberg.ch/

Ringgenberg (Swiss Standard German pronunciation: [ˈrɪŋɡn̩ˌbɛrɡ]; sometimes also written as Ringgenberg BE in order to distinguish it from other "Ringgenbergs") is a village and a municipality in the Interlaken-Oberhasli administrative district in the canton of Bern in Switzerland. Besides the village of Ringgenberg, the municipality also includes the village of Goldswil.

Ringgenberg is located on the northern shores of Lake Brienz. It has a small church that was built on the ruins of a castle in the 17th century.

Ringgenberg and Goldswil belong to the Small Agglomeration Interlaken with 23,300 inhabitants (2014).

== History ==
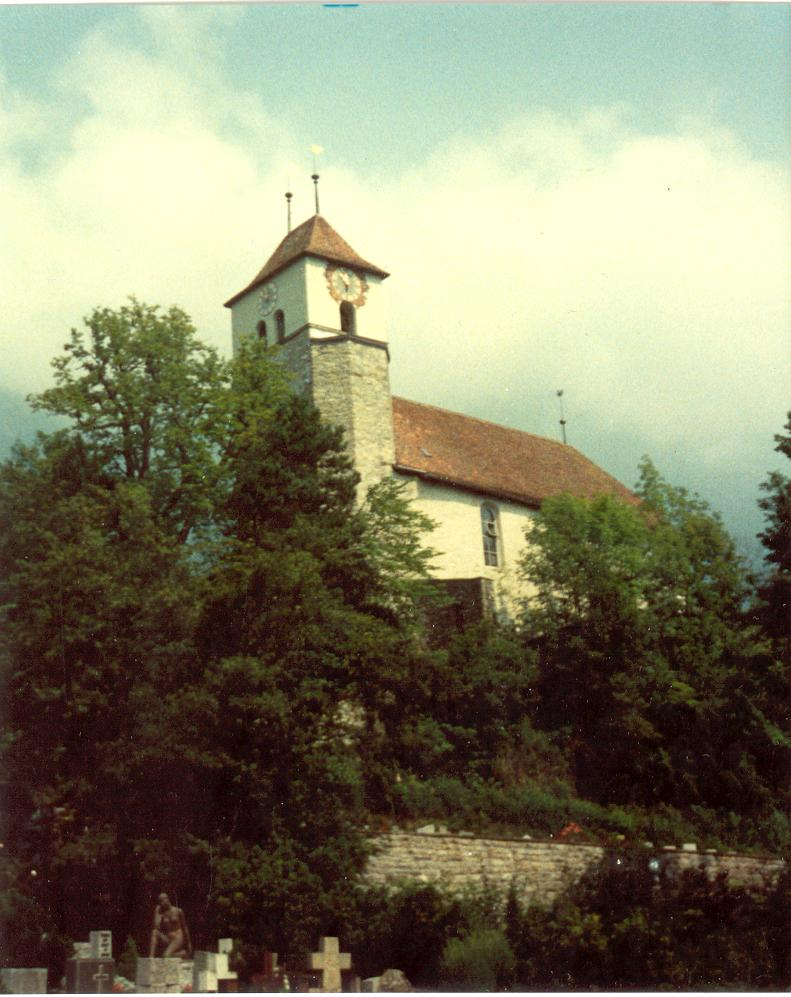
Ringgenberg Church, built in 1670 in the ruins of Ringgenberg Castle.

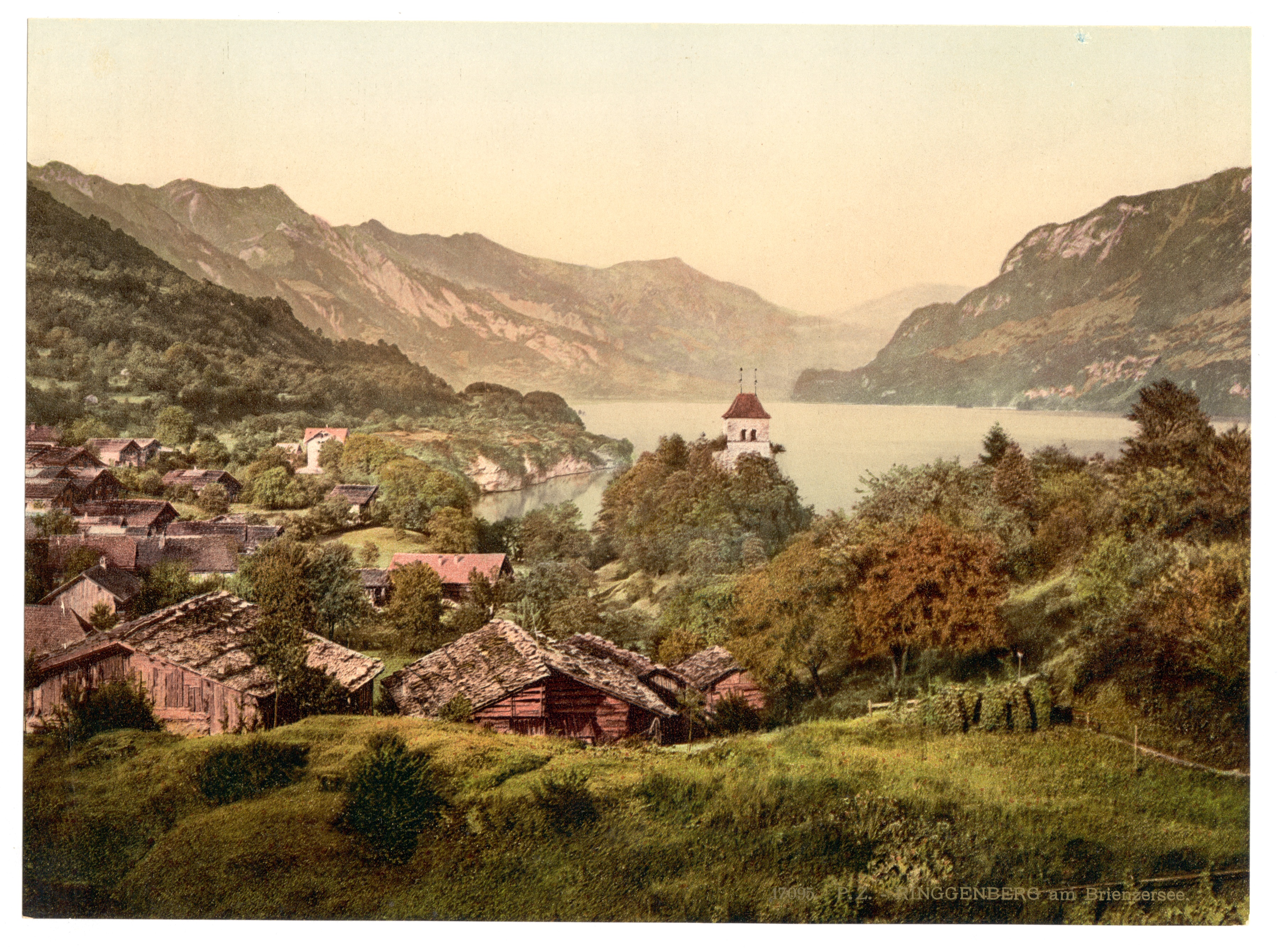
Photochrom postcard from 1890 to 1900 of Ringgenberg

The oldest traces of a settlement in the area are neolithic graves which have been discovered in the village and at Goldswil-Mätteli.

The original name of Ringgenberg was Rinchenwile which appears in the historic record in 1240. This name stems from the Old High German personal name Rinco or Rincho and the place name ending –wilari (little town). The modern name is based on an elision of Ringgenwil with the castle (burg), which was built in the Middle Ages.

In 1230 Kuno von Brienz was appointed overlord of the Lake Brienz area by the German Emperor Frederick II, Holy Roman Emperor, and built the castle at Ringgenberg. The noble family took its name from Ringgenberg. Johann von Ringgenberg was the most significant member of this family. He was known as "the knight who handled the sword and lyre equally well". His songs were collected in Zürich in around 1300 in the Codex Manesse collection.

During the 13th century, the Counts of Ringgenberg expanded their power, often at the expense of Interlaken Monastery. The ruin of the estate began in the time of Philipp von Ringgenberg (1351–1374). In 1351 part of the estate was sold to the monastery. In 1381 Ringgenberg castle was burnt and plundered by troops from the Canton of Uri and Count Petermann von Ringgenberg was taken in chains to Obwalden. In 1386, the castle and lands were assigned to Bern. However the city lacked the funds to rebuild the burned castle and in 1411 and 1439 parts of the castle and village were sold to Interlaken. A few years later, in 1445, Bern reacquired the land, but lost it again in 1457.

In 1528, the city of Bern adopted the new faith of the Protestant Reformation and began imposing it on the Bernese Oberland. Ringgenberg joined many other villages and the monastery in an unsuccessful rebellion against the new faith. After Bern imposed its will on the Oberland, they secularized the monastery and annexed all the monastery lands. Ringgenberg became a part of the Bernese bailiwick of Interlaken.

The church was built in the ruins of Ringgenberg Castle in 1670 under the architect Abraham Dunz. The imposing building stands on a hill between the town and lake.

In 1853 the separate municipalities of Goldswil and Ringgenberg were combined. A small lake, Burgseeli is located between the two villages.

In 1848, a road was built along the shores of Brienz Lake which connected Ringgenberg with the other towns of the area. In 1888 a harbor was built on the lake shore, allowing steamships to dock and helping tourists to visit the village's spa which opened in 1870. In 1916 the last leg of the Brünig railway line was completed, which passed through the village. Today the local economy is based on tourism, construction and mining at the municipal quarry. In addition, many residents commute to jobs in Interlaken.

It is the municipality of origin for many people with the surnames of Ringgenberg, Ringenberg, and Rinkenberg.

== Geography ==
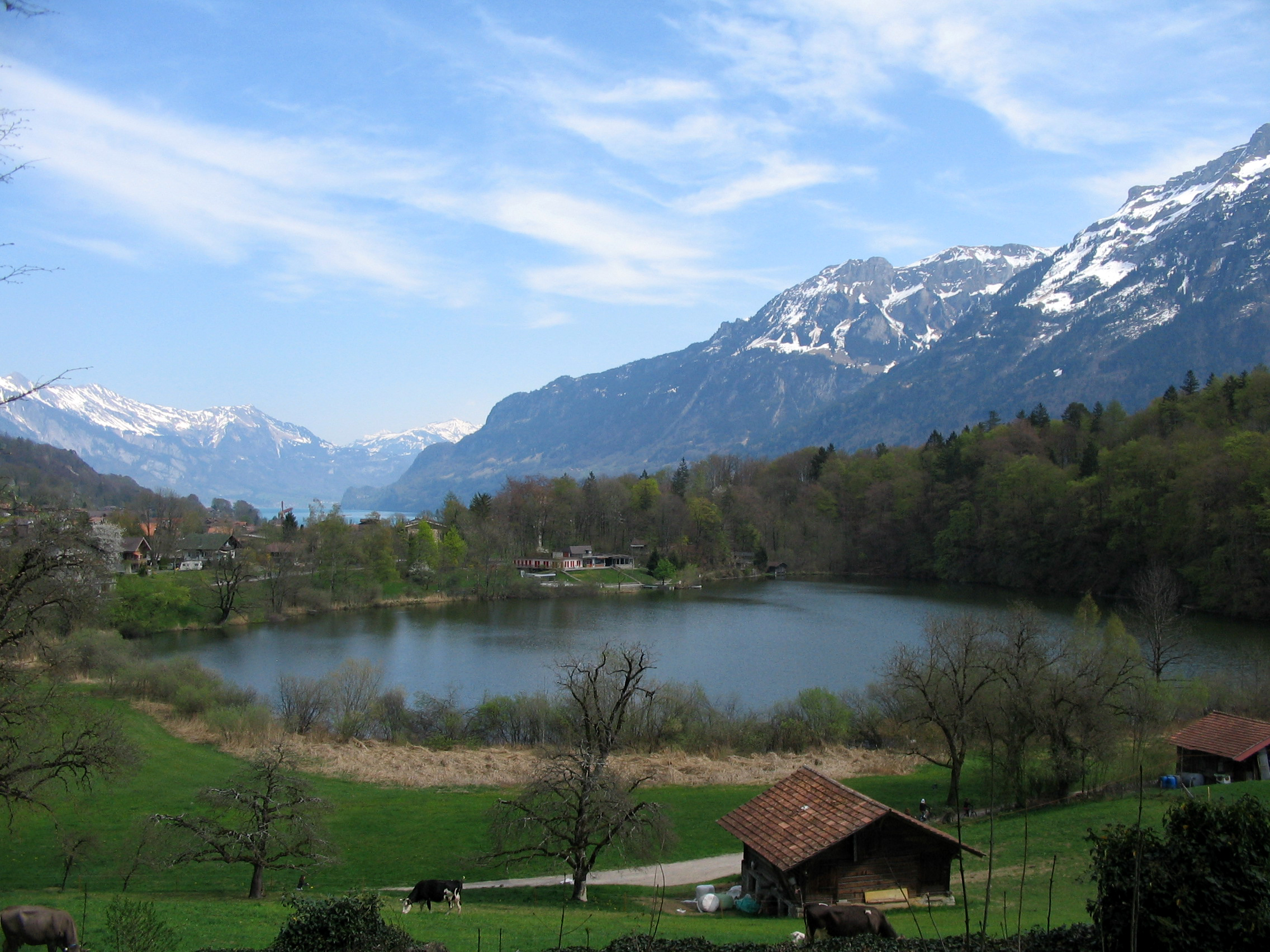
The Burgseeli separates Ringgenberg and Goldswil

Aerial view (1956)

Ringgenberg has an area of 8.73 km^{2} (3.37 sq mi). Of this area, 1.7 km^{2} (0.66 mi^{2}) or 19.4% is used for agricultural purposes, while 5.62 km^{2} (2.17 mi^{2}) or 64.2% is forested. Of the rest of the land, 1.02 km^{2} (0.39 mi^{2}) or 11.7% is settled (buildings or roads), 0.06 km^{2} (15 acres) or 0.7% is either rivers or lakes and 0.33 km^{2} (0.13 mi^{2}) or 3.8% is unproductive land.

Of the built up area, housing and buildings made up 6.3% and transportation infrastructure made up 2.9%. Out of the forested land, 58.3% of the total land area is heavily forested and 5.9% is covered with orchards or small clusters of trees. Of the agricultural land, 15.0% is pastures and 4.3% is used for alpine pastures. All the water in the municipality is in lakes.

The municipality is located north-east of Interlaken on the banks of Lake Brienz. It consists of the villages of Ringgenberg and Goldswil as well as alpine camps and settlements on the nearby mountains.

On 31 December 2009 Amtsbezirk Interlaken, the municipality's former district, was dissolved. On the following day, 1 January 2010, it joined the newly created Verwaltungskreis Interlaken-Oberhasli.

== Coat of arms ==
The blazon of the municipal coat of arms is Gules a Buckle Argent on a Mount of Six Coupeaux of the same.

== Demographics ==
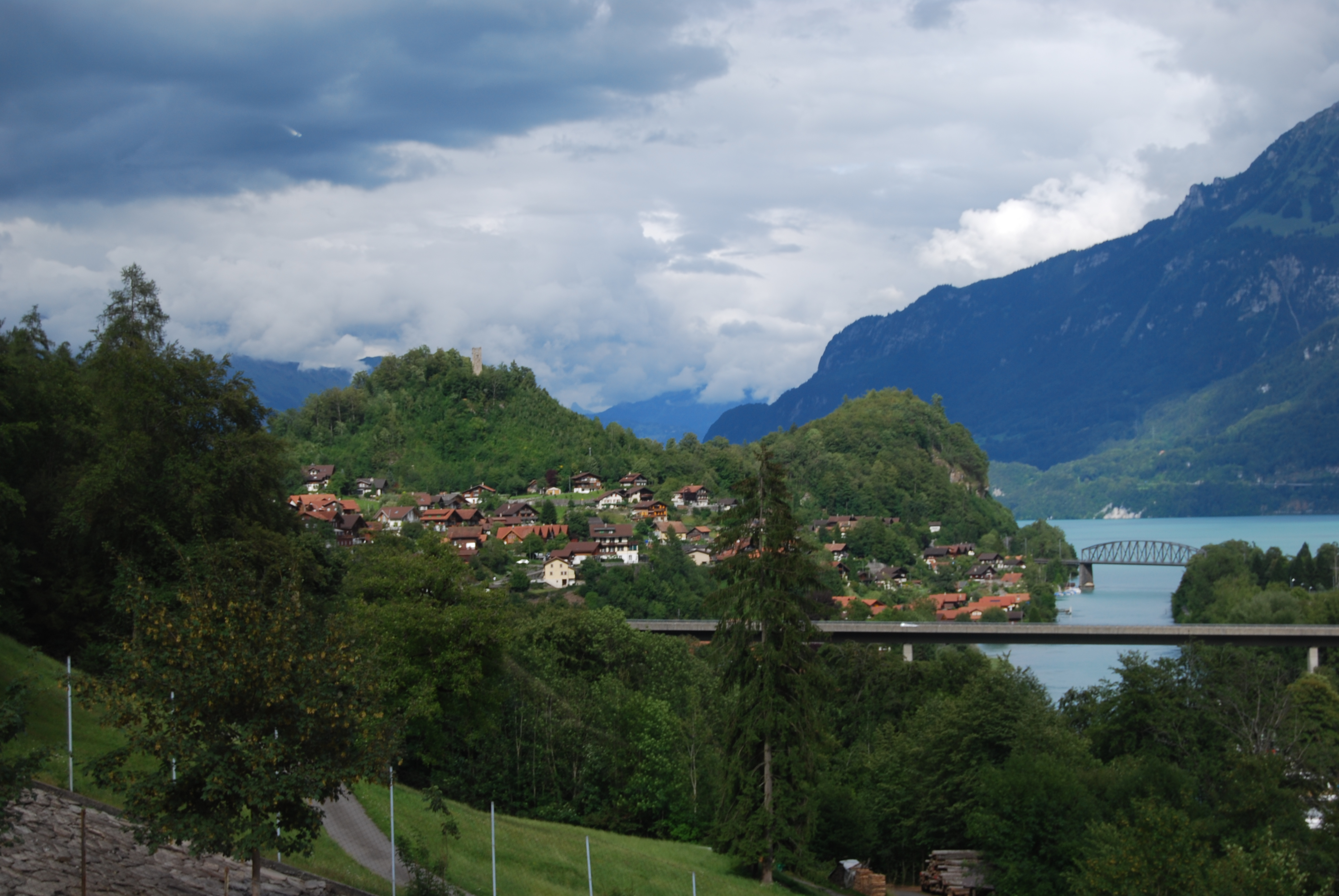
Goldswil village

Ringgenberg has a population (as of December 2020) of 2,588. As of 2010, 9.0% of the population are resident foreign nationals. Over the last 10 years (2000-2010) the population has changed at a rate of 7.2%. Migration accounted for 6.6%, while births and deaths accounted for 0.6%.

Most of the population (as of 2000) speaks German (2,408 or 94.3%) as their first language, Albanian is the second most common (34 or 1.3%) and English is the third (23 or 0.9%). There are 15 people who speak French, 19 people who speak Italian and 1 person who speaks Romansh.

As of 2008, the population was 49.6% male and 50.4% female. The population was made up of 1,161 Swiss men (44.9% of the population) and 123 (4.8%) non-Swiss men. There were 1,193 Swiss women (46.1%) and 111 (4.3%) non-Swiss women. Of the population in the municipality, 778 or about 30.5% were born in Ringgenberg and lived there in 2000. There were 987 or 38.6% who were born in the same canton, while 408 or 16.0% were born somewhere else in Switzerland, and 267 or 10.5% were born outside of Switzerland.

As of 2010, children and teenagers (0–19 years old) make up 21.5% of the population, while adults (20–64 years old) make up 60% and seniors (over 64 years old) make up 18.5%.

As of 2000, there were 1,041 people who were single and never married in the municipality. There were 1,182 married individuals, 203 widows or widowers and 128 individuals who are divorced.

As of 2000, there were 349 households that consist of only one person and 62 households with five or more people. In 2000, a total of 1,022 apartments (77.0% of the total) were permanently occupied, while 220 apartments (16.6%) were seasonally occupied and 85 apartments (6.4%) were empty. As of 2010, the construction rate of new housing units was 1.5 new units per 1000 residents. The vacancy rate for the municipality, in 2011, was 0.46%.

The historical population is given in the following chart:

== Heritage sites of national significance ==
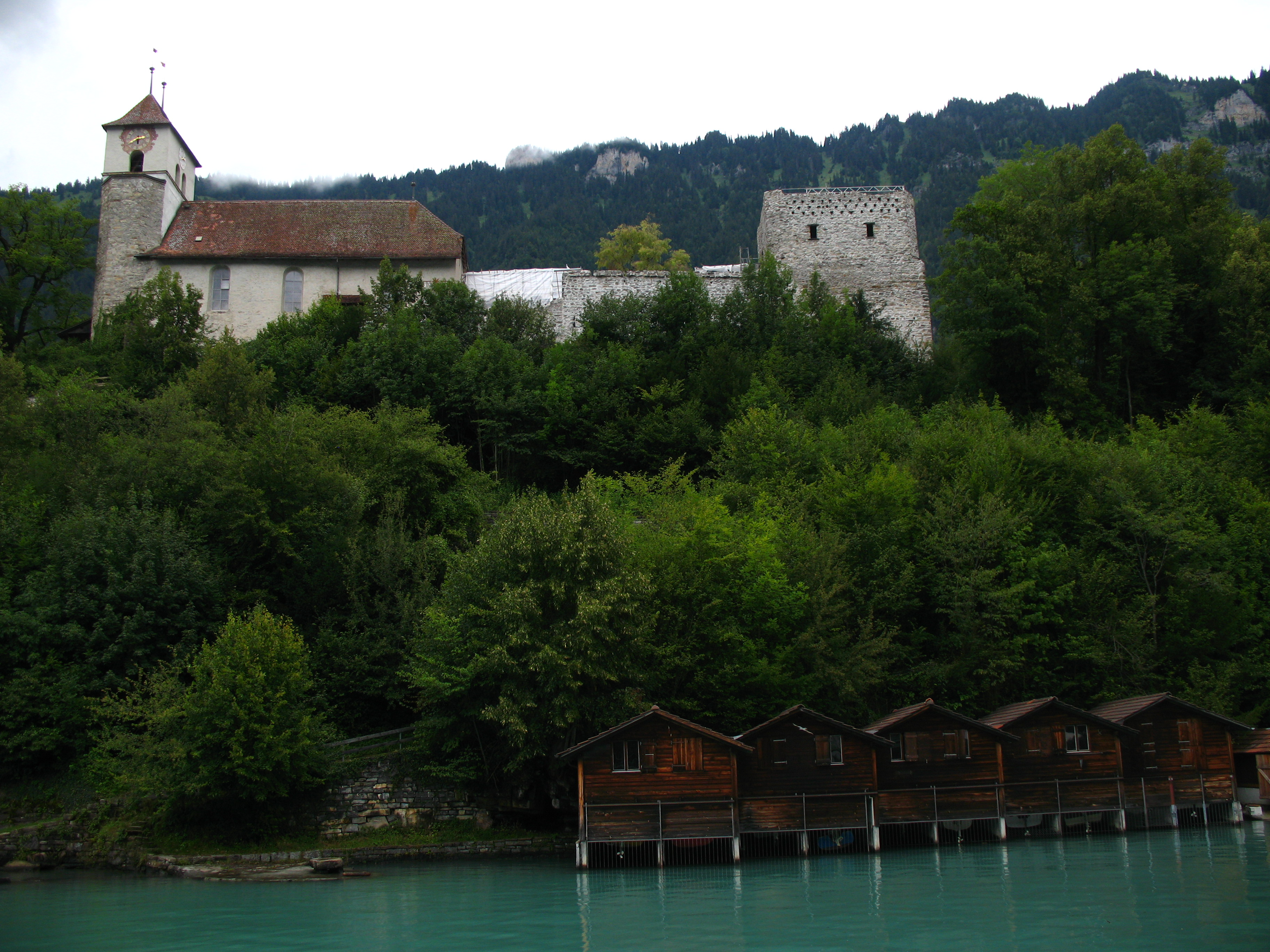
Church and ruins of Ringgenberg Castle

The church and ruins of Ringgenberg Castle are listed as a single Swiss heritage site of national significance. The entire village of Ringgenberg is part of the Inventory of Swiss Heritage Sites.

== Politics ==
In the 2011 federal election the most popular party was the Swiss People's Party (SVP) which received 33.7% of the vote. The next three most popular parties were the Conservative Democratic Party (BDP) (18.7%), the Social Democratic Party (SP) (14.7%) and the Green Party (9.7%). In the federal election, a total of 878 votes were cast, and the voter turnout was 44.7%.

== Economy ==
As of 2011, Ringgenberg had an unemployment rate of 1.9%. As of 2008, there were a total of 724 people employed in the municipality. Of these, there were 39 people employed in the primary economic sector and about 16 businesses involved in this sector. 198 people were employed in the secondary sector and there were 31 businesses in this sector. 487 people were employed in the tertiary sector, with 75 businesses in this sector. There were 1,244 residents of the municipality who were employed in some capacity, of which females made up 42.8% of the workforce.

In 2008 there were a total of 578 full-time equivalent jobs. The number of jobs in the primary sector was 20, of which 16 were in agriculture and 4 were in forestry or lumber production. The number of jobs in the secondary sector was 185 of which 40 or (21.6%) were in manufacturing, 3 or (1.6%) were in mining and 141 (76.2%) were in construction. The number of jobs in the tertiary sector was 373. In the tertiary sector; 58 or 15.5% were in wholesale or retail sales or the repair of motor vehicles, 7 or 1.9% were in the movement and storage of goods, 44 or 11.8% were in a hotel or restaurant, 12 or 3.2% were the insurance or financial industry, 18 or 4.8% were technical professionals or scientists, 40 or 10.7% were in education and 149 or 39.9% were in health care.

In 2000, there were 277 workers who commuted into the municipality and 809 workers who commuted away. The municipality is a net exporter of workers, with about 2.9 workers leaving the municipality for every one entering. Of the working population, 13.1% used public transportation to get to work, and 52.3% used a private car.

== Religion ==
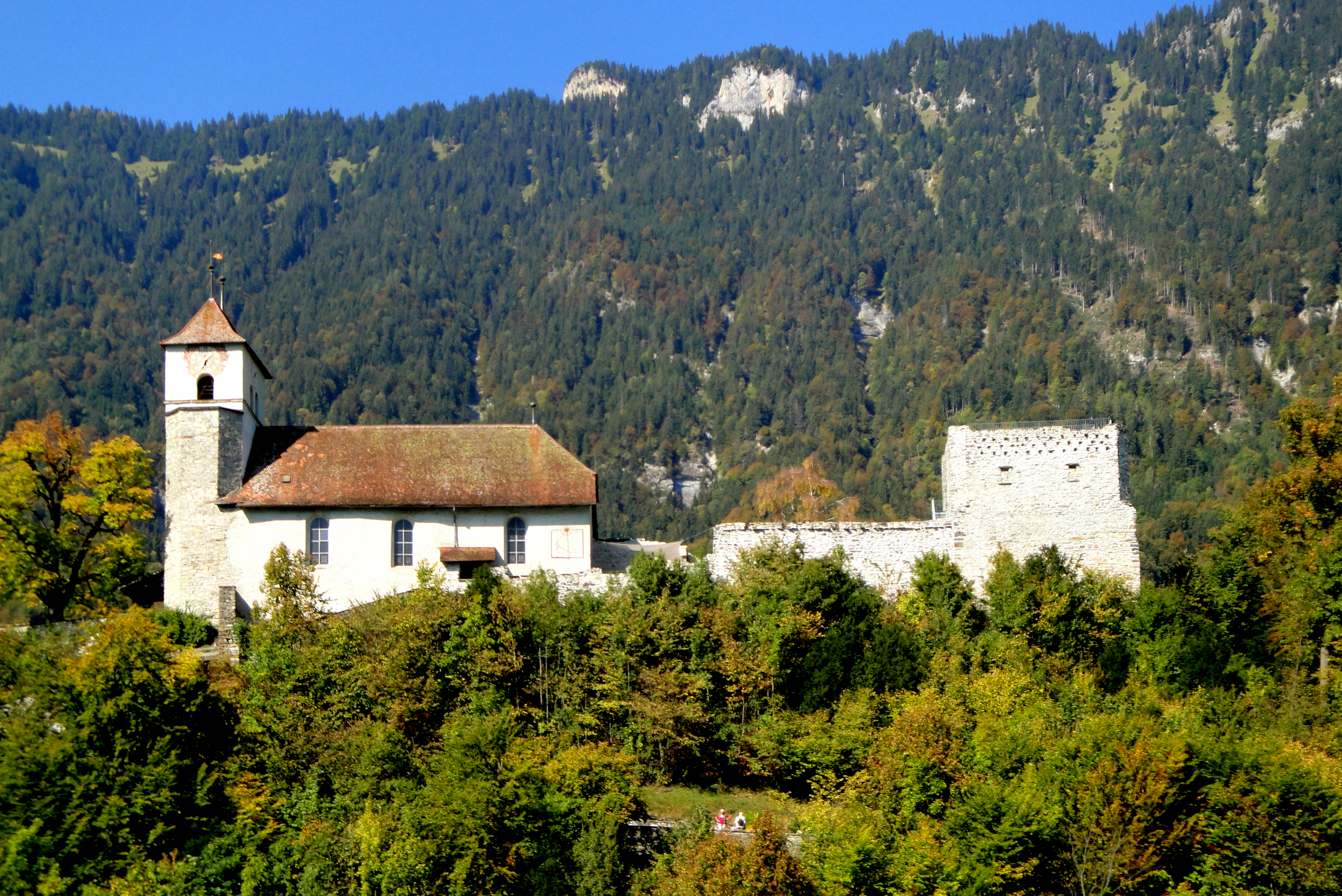
Ringgenberg Church and the ruins of the castle

From the 2000 census, 289 or 11.3% were Roman Catholic, while 1,877 or 73.5% belonged to the Swiss Reformed Church. Of the rest of the population, there were 12 members of an Orthodox church (or about 0.47% of the population), there were 2 individuals (or about 0.08% of the population) who belonged to the Christian Catholic Church, and there were 180 individuals (or about 7.05% of the population) who belonged to another Christian church. There was 1 individual who was Jewish, and 43 (or about 1.68% of the population) who were Islamic. There were 4 individuals who were Buddhist, 3 individuals who were Hindu and 1 individual who belonged to another church. 126 (or about 4.93% of the population) belonged to no church, are agnostic or atheist, and 104 individuals (or about 4.07% of the population) did not answer the question.

== Education ==
In Ringgenberg about 1,114 or (43.6%) of the population have completed non-mandatory upper secondary education, and 235 or (9.2%) have completed additional higher education (either university or a Fachhochschule). Of the 235 who completed tertiary schooling, 71.1% were Swiss men, 20.9% were Swiss women, 4.7% were non-Swiss men and 3.4% were non-Swiss women.

The Canton of Bern school system provides one year of non-obligatory Kindergarten, followed by six years of Primary school. This is followed by three years of obligatory lower Secondary school where the students are separated according to ability and aptitude. Following the lower Secondary students may attend additional schooling or they may enter an apprenticeship.

During the 2010–11 school year, there were a total of 308 students attending classes in Ringgenberg. There were 2 kindergarten classes with a total of 30 students in the municipality. Of the kindergarten students, 6.7% were permanent or temporary residents of Switzerland (not citizens) and 10.0% have a different mother language than the classroom language. The municipality had 9 primary classes and 172 students. Of the primary students, 9.9% were permanent or temporary residents of Switzerland (not citizens) and 12.2% have a different mother language than the classroom language. During the same year, there were 5 lower secondary classes with a total of 90 students. There were 11.1% who were permanent or temporary residents of Switzerland (not citizens) and 7.8% have a different mother language than the classroom language. The remainder of the students attend a private or special school.

As of 2000, there were 6 students in Ringgenberg who came from another municipality, while 73 residents attended schools outside the municipality.

== Transport ==
Ringgenberg railway station is on the Brünig line, and is served by an hourly Regio train between Interlaken and Meiringen. An hourly post bus also connects Interlaken, Goldswil and Ringgenberg.

== Other information ==
Ringgenberg is also the centre of the Ringgenberg-Goldswil Planetenweg, a 1:1.000.000.000 scale model of the Solar System with the Sun and planets arranged along a walking route connecting nearby towns.
