= Rudenz Castle (Uri) =

Building in the canton of Uri, Switzerland

- Flüelen
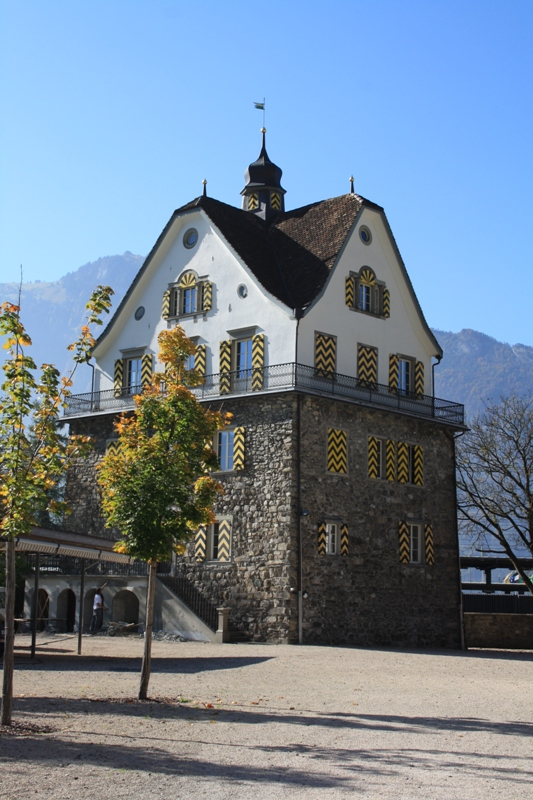
- Rudenz Castle

Site information
- Code: CH-UR
- Condition: preserved

Location
- Coordinates: 46°54′07″N 8°37′30″E
- Height: 435 m above the sea

Site history
- Built: early 13th century

The Rudenz Castle (Schloss Rudenz) is a fortified tower in Flüelen, a municipality in the canton of Uri in Switzerland.

== History ==
The tower was built in the early 13th century. It protected the Gotthard road (Gotthardstrasse) and housed an Imperial customs post. In the 14th century, the right to collect Imperial customs was owned by the Lords of Attinghausen. The first known owner of the tower was Baron Johann von Attinghausen. After Baron Johann von Attinghausen's death around 1360, ownership passed to the Haslital Knight of Rudenz (by virtue of marriage). The tower thus came to be known as the Castle of Rudenz. The Knights of Rudenz were in the service of the Freiherr of Brienz-Ringgenberg and owned castles in Meiringen and Giswil before inheriting the tower at Flüelen. The inheritance was disputed and Johann von Rudenz finally took possession of the castle in the 1370s. As part of receiving the inheritance on 19 June 1365 he granted half the collected tolls to the Canton of Uri. He ruled there for only a few years and died, the last of his line, before 1383.

After the death of Johann von Rudenz, the castle passed through a number of owners. In the first half of the 17th century it was owned by Landammann Johann Heinrich von Brunnen. In 1727 it was acquired by Johann Joachim Epp. Then, in 1815 the Zgraggen family purchased it for 1,900 florins. They repaired the old tower and returned it to a livable condition. They filled in the old dry moat and planted extensive gardens around the castle. However, over the following centuries, they had to sell off parts of the land and the gardens were replaced with streets and buildings as Flüelen grew. The castle was later sold to the municipality of Flüelen. In 2005 the municipality opened a public park on the castle grounds and opened the great hall for events.

== Castle site ==
The tower is located near the center of Flüelen. The tower has a 11.5 by 14 meters (38 ft × 46 ft) rectangular floor plan. The walls are unevenly thick, the eastern wall is 2.5 m (8.2 ft) while the other three are 1.8 m (5.9 ft). The tower was surrounded by curtain walls with defensive towers at the corners. However, the towers and much of the walls have been demolished. Today the tower is only partially surrounded by a low wall. By the 17th century, the tower was topped with the current four gabled roof topped with a pointed spire. The wrap around balcony and new windows were added in the 18th century. In the 19th century the pointed spire was replaced with the current onion dome spire. In 1931 the tower was repaired and restored, bringing the original stone to light. The castle contains eleven rooms, a great hall, a large kitchen and cellars.
