= Wartenstein Castle (Bern) =

Castle in Lauperswil in Bern, Switzerland

- Lauperswil
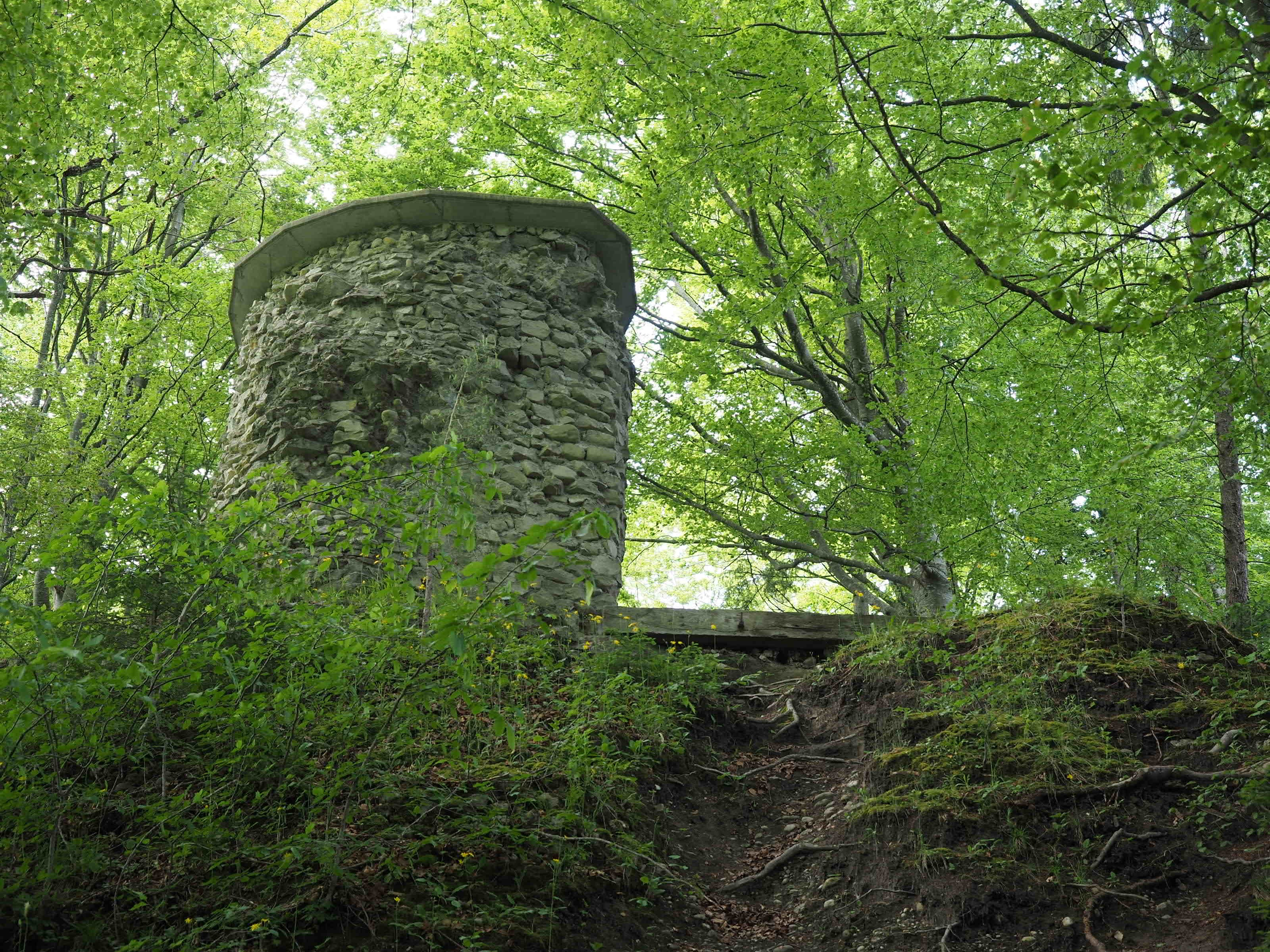
- Ruins of the main tower of Wartenstein

Site information
- Type: Hill castle
- Code: CH
- Condition: Ruin

Location
- Coordinates: 46°58′16″N 7°43′57″E

Site history
- Built: 13th Century

Garrison information
- Occupants: Minor nobility

Wartenstein Castle is a castle, now in ruins, located in the municipality of Lauperswil in the Canton of Bern of Switzerland.

== History ==
The area around Lauperswil and Rüderswil was originally part of the Freiherrschaft of Signau. By the 12th century it was controlled by the lords of Ruoderswilare, who ruled out of a castle south-west of Rüderswil. By the 13th century this castle was replaced by the new Wartenstein Castle at Lauperswil. It is unknown when this castle was first built, but by 1228 the knight Swaro von Wartenstein lived there. His descendant, Heinrich Swaro, sold the castle in 1284 to Trub monastery, but received the castle back as a fief from the monastery.

By 1288, the castle was owned by Werner von Schweinsberg. The Schweinsberg family also owned land and Attinghausen Castle in the Canton of Uri. Werner's son was the famous Uri Landammann Werner von Attinghausen who signed an early treaty and led Uri during the early years of the Growth of the Old Swiss Confederacy. However, the castle at Wartenstein remained with the Schweinsberg family.

During the Burgdorferkrieg, in 1383, Bernese troops captured and burned the castle. In 1415 the last male heir, Thüring von Schweinsberg, died, leaving the ruins of the castle to his son in law Ulrich von Balmoos. In 1493, the Basel Junker Wilhelm Hug von Sulz inherited the ruins from his grandchildren. He built a country manor house in the valley three years later. The castle ruins continued to change hands throughout the following centuries. The Herrschaft of Wartenstein was dissolved and Lauperswil village became part of the Vogtei of Trachselwald.

According to local legend, during the Bernese siege, the last lord of the castle ordered all his treasure thrown down the well. He and his daughter then attempted to flee the castle, but their horse slipped on the narrow trail and they both and the horse fell to their deaths in the valley below.

Drawings from the 19th century show that the main tower was mostly intact at that time, though portions have now collapsed. In 1965 the remaining walls of the inner castle were excavated and repaired.

== Location ==
The heavily weathered castle ruins are located on a wooded hill above the village of Lauperswil. It is about 1 kilometer (0.62 mi) north-west of the village section of Zollbrück along the Rüderswil road. A steep, about 20 minute, marked trail begins in the hamlet of Blindenbach and leads to the ruins.

== Castle site ==
The castle was built on a narrow ridge above the village, on three hand carved terraces. The northern terrace may have contained a bailey but that is uncertain. The southern terrace held the main castle with a tower, courtyard and great hall. On the east slope near the castle there are still traces of a building as well as the castle well.

== See also ==
- List of castles and fortresses in Switzerland
