= Rosenburg Castle (Ramsenberg) =

Castle ruin in Herisau. Appenzell Ausserrhoden, Switzerland

Rosenburg
- Ramsenberg
- Herisau
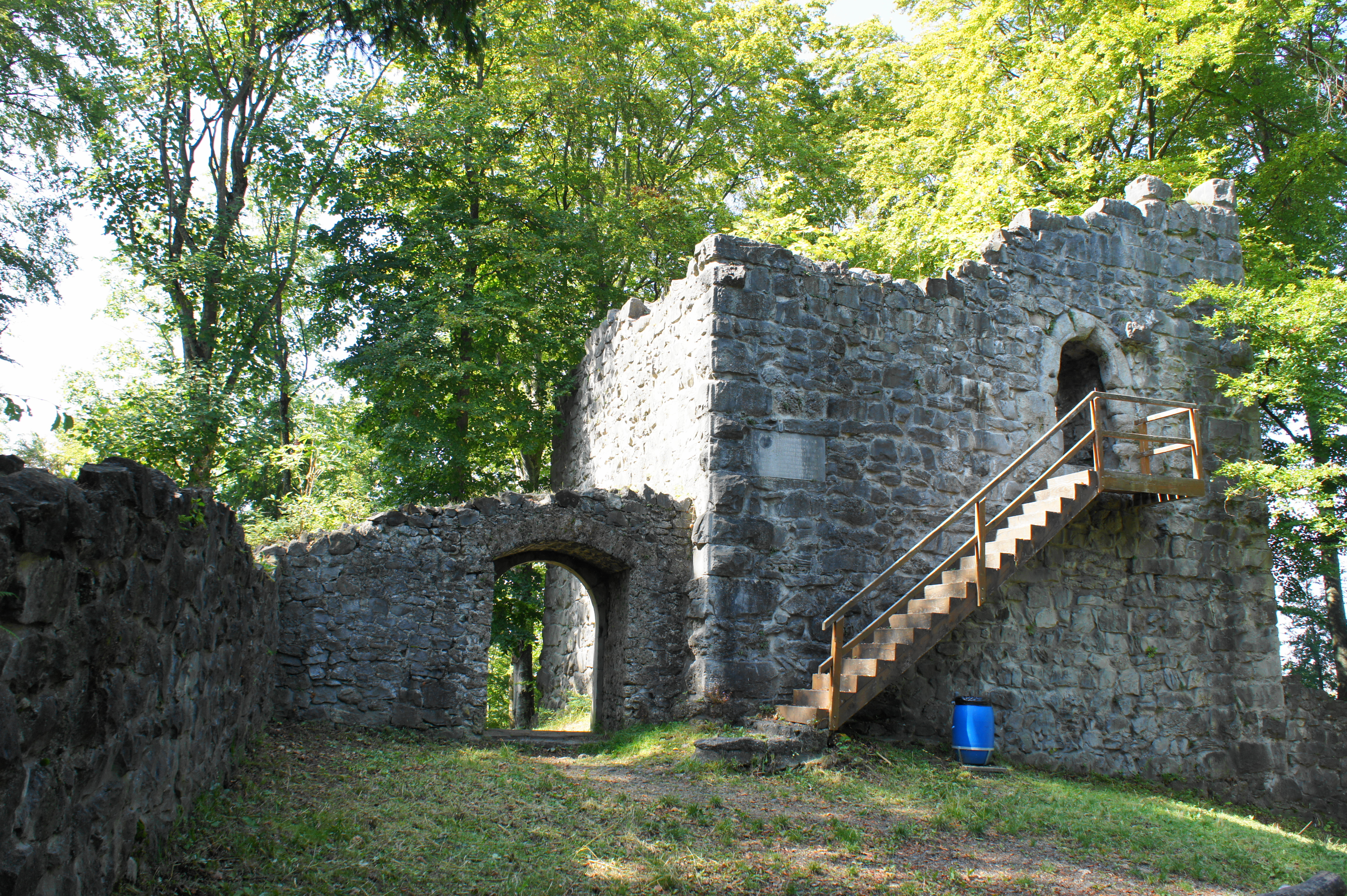
- Inner courtyard of Rosenburg with the entrance to the left and a wooden staircase to the ruined tower (right)

Site information
- Type: hill castle
- Code: CH-AR
- Condition: Ruins

Location
- Location within Canton of Appenzell Ausserrhoden Location within Switzerland
- Coordinates: 47°23′18″N 9°15′16″E
- Height: 926 m above sea level (NN)

Site history
- Built: um 1150

Rosenburg Castle is a ruined castle located to the west of the municipality of Herisau in the canton of Appenzell Ausserrhoden in Switzerland. It is a Swiss heritage site of national significance. The castle is on the Ramsenstock (926 m (3,038 ft)) and is therefore also called Ramsenburg.

== History ==
In 1176 the noble family of Rorschach first appeared in the record as knights in service to the Abbot of St. Gall. Over the following centuries this family owned a number of castles and produced many separate lines, all of which used a rose bush somewhere in their coat of arms. Around 1200 they built two castles near Herisau, one called Rosenberg, the other Rosenburg and about 2.3 km (1.4 mi) apart. Rosenberg Castle was located north of Herisau.

In 1270 a descendant of the Rorschachs, Egilolve von Rosinburc, was mentioned at Rosenburg. The castle itself was mentioned five years later, in connection with the destruction of Urstein Castle. The castle was smaller than nearby Rosenberg. In the 14th century chronicle of Johannes von Winterthur, the two Rosenburg brothers, both named Rudolf, no longer lived at the castle, instead a farmer occupied it for them. The chronicle recounts that a pair of knights and their servants entered the castle to drive out the farmer and take it for themselves. However, the farmer surprised them and killed both knights in the castle and then their servants in the stables.

In 1350 the two Rudolfs promised their cousin, Eglolf von Rosenberg, to not attack or damage the castle at Rosenberg. In exchange he promised to give them the Rosenberg estates in Herisau after he died. In 1396 they sold the estates at Herisau to the Abbey of St. Gall, but retained the castle. However during the Appenzell Wars, in 1403, the castle was attacked and burned by Appenzellers who had revolted against the Abbot. By 1466 the ruined castle was owned by the Abbey, where it remained until the upheavals of the Helvetic Republic and Act of Mediation in 1803. The ruins were given to the newly formed Canton of St. Gallen, who sold them to Herisau in 1809 for 440 florins. The ruins were excavated, stabilized and repaired in 1936/37.

== Castle site ==
The 13th-century tower is 9.7 m × 9.9 m (32 ft × 32 ft) with walls that are up to 2.9 m (9.5 ft) thick. The entrance to the tower is located about 4.4 m (14 ft) above the ground. On the west side of the tower are the ruins of the larger late 13th- or early 14th-century main castle.

== See also ==
- List of castles and fortresses in Switzerland
