= List of cultural property of national significance in Switzerland: Graubünden =

This list contains all cultural property of national significance (class A) in the canton of Graubünden from the 2009 'Swiss Inventory of Cultural Property of National and Regional Significance. It is sorted by municipality and contains 174 individual buildings, 16 collections and 38 archaeological finds. The names are given in either German, Italian or Romansh according to the majority language of the municipality. Some names were translated for clarity.

The geographic coordinates provided are in the Swiss coordinate system as given in the inventory.

Contents: Top - A B C D F G H I J K L M P R S T U V W Z

== Alvaneu ==
KGS No.^{?}	Picture	Name	Street Address	CH1903 X coordinate	CH1903 Y coordinate	Location
Unknown	UNESCO World Heritage Site Rhaetian Railway in the Albula / Bernina Landscapes (since 2008)	UNESCO World Heritage Site; Rhaetian Railway in the Albula / Bernina Landscapes (since 2008)				
Unknown	ISOS vitg: Alvaneu	ISOS vitg: Alvaneu				

== Albula/Alvra ==
KGS No.^{?}	Picture	Name	Street Address	CH1903 X coordinate	CH1903 Y coordinate	Location
Unknown	UNESCO World Heritage Site Rhaetian Railway in the Albula / Bernina Landscapes (since 2008)	UNESCO World Heritage Site; Rhaetian Railway in the Albula / Bernina Landscapes (since 2008)				
2828	Church of S. Peder E Conturn	Church of S. Peder E Conturn	Curt Da Mistail 50	762.400	170.580	46.666682°N 9.560961°E
3115		Catholic Church of St. Francestg E Chasa Pravenda	Veia Principala, Mon	762.762	168.781	46.650416°N 9.565053°E
3349	Catholic Church of St. Stefan E Conturn	Catholic Church of St. Stefan E Conturn	Veia Baselgia	763.490	170.040	46.66156°N 9.575007°E
Unknown	ISOS vitg: Alvaschein	ISOS vitg: Alvaschein				

== Andeer ==
KGS No.^{?}	Picture	Name	Street Address	CH1903 X coordinate	CH1903 Y coordinate	Location
2833	Padrun House	Padrun House	(Giassa Dad Asens) Veia Sgraffito 64	752.323	163.194	46.602637°N 9.426882°E
Unknown		ISOS vitg: Andeer				
Unknown		ISOS vitg: Pignia				

== Arosa ==
KGS No.^{?}	Picture	Name	Street Address	CH1903 X coordinate	CH1903 Y coordinate	Location
9613		Carschlingg, Prehistoric / Late-Roman / Early Middle Ages Settlement	Castiel	765.000	189.750	46.838422°N 9.601831°E
9075	Langwieser Viaduct of the Rhaetian Railway	Langwieser Viaduct of the Rhaetian Railway	Langwies	772.929	187.652	46.817544°N 9.704932°E
Unknown		ISOS Hamlet: Medergen				
Unknown		ISOS Hamlet: Sapün				
Unknown		ISOS Hamlet: Strassberg				

== Avers ==
KGS No.^{?}	Picture	Name	Street Address	CH1903 X coordinate	CH1903 Y coordinate	Location
2855	Swiss Reformed Church	Swiss Reformed Church	(Chilchawäg) Cresta 105	759.477	148.783	46.471379°N 9.51524°E
Unknown		ISOS Spezialfall: Averser Hofweiler				

== Bergün Filisur ==
KGS No.^{?}	Picture	Name	Street Address	CH1903 X coordinate	CH1903 Y coordinate	Location
2860	Swiss Reformed Church	Swiss Reformed Church	Stugl, Bergün	775.500	169.140	46.650418°N 9.731515°E
2864	Jenatsch House	Jenatsch House	Unterdorf, Bergün	776.620	166.857	46.629595°N 9.745262°E
10488	Ruins of Greifenstein Castle	Ruins of Greifenstein Castle	Filisur	772.400	171.800	46.675144°N 9.692035°E
3009	Schmittentobel-Landwasserviadukt of the Rhaetian Railway	Schmittentobel-Landwasserviadukt of the Rhaetian Railway		771.160	172.40	46.680858°N 9.676059°E
Unknown	UNESCO World Heritage Site Rhaetian Railway in the Albula / Bernina Landscapes (since 2008)	UNESCO World Heritage Site; Rhaetian Railway in the Albula / Bernina Landscapes (since 2008)				
Unknown		ISOS vitg: Bravuogn				
Unknown		ISOS fracziun: Latsch				
Unknown		ISOS fracziun: Stugl				
Unknown		ISOS Dorf: Filisur				

== Bever ==
KGS No.^{?}	Picture	Name	Street Address	CH1903 X coordinate	CH1903 Y coordinate	Location
Unknown	UNESCO World Heritage Site Rhaetian Railway in the Albula / Bernina Landscapes (since 2008)	UNESCO World Heritage Site; Rhaetian Railway in the Albula / Bernina Landscapes (since 2008)				
Unknown		ISOS vitg: Bever				

== Bregaglia ==
KGS No.^{?}	Picture	Name	Street Address	CH1903 X coordinate	CH1903 Y coordinate	Location
9612	Castelmur Castle, Roman Way-Station / Medieval Fortress	Castelmur Castle, Roman Way-Station / Medieval Fortress	Bondo	763.340	134.400	46.341112°N 9.560451°E
2879	Church Swiss Reformed Church di Nossa Donna	Church Swiss Reformed Church di Nossa Donna	Bondo	763.446	134.219	46.339458°N 9.561763°E
2878	Palazzo Salis with a garden	Palazzo Salis with a garden	Bondo, Villaggio 1	762.845	133.761	46.335486°N 9.5538°E
9269		Antonio House	Soglio, Villaggio 139	761.794	134.478	46.342187°N 9.540405°E
9270	Battista House	Battista House	Soglio, Villaggio 131 (Hotel Palazzo Salis)	761.734	134.476	46.342184°N 9.539625°E
9271		Di Mezzo House, with Stables	Soglio, Villaggio 137	761.771	134.477	46.342184°N 9.540106°E
3289		Cas’Alta	Soglio, Villaggio 120	761.716	134.463	46.342071°N 9.539387°E
3312	Castello Castelmur	Castello Castelmur	Stampa, Coltura	763.440	134.260	46.339828°N 9.5617°E
Unknown		ISOS villaggio: Bondo				
Unknown		ISOS villaggio: Borgonovo				
Unknown		ISOS villaggio: Castasegna				
Unknown		ISOS villaggio: Coltura				
Unknown		ISOS villaggio: Promontogno				
Unknown		ISOS villaggio: Soglio				
Unknown		ISOS villaggio: Stampa				
Unknown		ISOS villaggio: Vicosoprano				

== Breil/Brigels ==
KGS No.^{?}	Picture	Name	Street Address	CH1903 X coordinate	CH1903 Y coordinate	Location
2883	Chaplutta S. Sievi	Chaplutta S. Sievi	Cuort	723.980	181.660	46.774572°N 9.062031°E

== Brienz/Brinzauls ==
KGS No.^{?}	Picture	Name	Street Address	CH1903 X coordinate	CH1903 Y coordinate	Location
2884	Ruins of Belfort Castle	Ruins of Belfort Castle		766.160	171.180	46.671151°N 9.610291°E
10035		Tgesa Gronda	Vazerol 66	763.552	171.025	46.670402°N 9.576167°E
Unknown	UNESCO World Heritage Site Rhaetian Railway in the Albula / Bernina Landscapes (since 2008)	UNESCO World Heritage Site; Rhaetian Railway in the Albula / Bernina Landscapes (since 2008)				
Unknown		ISOS vitg: Brienz / Brinzauls				

== Brusio ==
KGS No.^{?}	Picture	Name	Street Address	CH1903 X coordinate	CH1903 Y coordinate	Location
10380		Casa Di Risch	Via Cantonale 186	807.624	124.998	46.244354°N 10.131102°E
2887	Church di S. Romerio e dintorni	Church di S. Romerio e dintorni	Alpe San Romerio	806.360	129.140	46.28198°N 10.116557°E
2886	Gruppo di 9 "Crot"	Gruppo di 9 "Crot"	La Costa	807.347	126.342	46.256522°N 10.12811°E
Unknown	UNESCO World Heritage Site Rhaetian Railway in the Albula / Bernina Landscapes (since 2008)	UNESCO World Heritage Site; Rhaetian Railway in the Albula / Bernina Landscapes (since 2008)				
Unknown		ISOS casale / piccolo villaggio: Cavaione				

== Calanca ==
KGS No.^{?}	Picture	Name	Street Address	CH1903 X coordinate	CH1903 Y coordinate	Location
Unknown		ISOS casale / piccolo villaggio: Landarenca				
Unknown		ISOS villaggio: Braggio Aira				
Unknown		ISOS villaggio: Bodio / Cauco				

== Calfreisen ==
KGS No.^{?}	Picture	Name	Street Address	CH1903 X coordinate	CH1903 Y coordinate	Location
Unknown		ISOS Dorf: Calfreisen				

== Castrisch ==
KGS No.^{?}	Picture	Name	Street Address	CH1903 X coordinate	CH1903 Y coordinate	Location
Unknown		ISOS vitg: Castrisch				

== Cazis ==
KGS No.^{?}	Picture	Name	Street Address	CH1903 X coordinate	CH1903 Y coordinate	Location
2907		Cresta; Prehistoric Settlement		752.330	175.250	46.711051°N 9.43097°E
2911	Chapel St. Wendelin	Chapel St. Wendelin	Am Dorfplatz 17	752.140	176.310	46.720627°N 9.428838°E
2908	Catholic Burial Church of St. Martin	Catholic Burial Church of St. Martin	St. Martinsstrasse	752.726	176.200	46.719504°N 9.436464°E
Unknown		ISOS Dorf: Präz				
Unknown		ISOS Dorf: Sarn				

== Celerina/Schlarigna ==
KGS No.^{?}	Picture	Name	Street Address	CH1903 X coordinate	CH1903 Y coordinate	Location
2912	Church Swiss Reformed S. Gian E Conturn	Church Swiss Reformed S. Gian E Conturn	Vietta Plaun San Gian	786.550	154.220	46.513272°N 9.869749°E
Unknown	UNESCO World Heritage Site Rhaetian Railway in the Albula / Bernina Landscapes (since 2008)	UNESCO World Heritage Site; Rhaetian Railway in the Albula / Bernina Landscapes (since 2008)				

== Chur ==
KGS No.^{?}	Picture	Name	Street Address	CH1903 X coordinate	CH1903 Y coordinate	Location
9082	Old Armory (Zeughaus 3)	Old Armory (Zeughaus 3)	Waffenplatzstrasse 58	757.145	190.714	46.848992°N 9.49923°E
2915	Altes Gebäude (Court House) with Garden	Altes Gebäude (Court House) with Garden	Poststrasse 14	759.641	190.873	46.849827°N 9.532°E
9614	Old City, Early Medieval Church, Medieval and Early Modern City	Old City, Early Medieval Church, Medieval and Early Modern City		759.700	190.800	46.849156°N 9.532748°E
10037	Antistitium with Hasenstube	Antistitium with Hasenstube	Kirchgasse 12, 14	759.721	190.664	46.847929°N 9.532975°E
2917; 9332; 8901	Bishops Manor with Library and Archive	Bishops Manor with Library and Archive	Hof 19–22	759.886	190.700	46.848213°N 9.53515°E
8479	Bündner Art Museum	Bündner Art Museum	Postplatz / Bahnhofstrasse 35	759.664	191.041	46.851332°N 9.53236°E
8481	Bündner Natural History Museum	Bündner Natural History Museum	Masanserstrasse 31	759.797	191.366	46.854223°N 9.534217°E
2927	Federal Powder Mill	Federal Powder Mill	Pulvermühlestrasse 79, 81	757.840	191.288	46.853989°N 9.508538°E
2920	Gabentempel (Federal Fortification 1863)	Gabentempel (Federal Fortification 1863)	Pulvermühlestrasse	757.373	191.267	46.85391°N 9.502409°E
2941	Main Post Office	Main Post Office	Postplatz / Gäuggelistrasse 1	759.572	190.960	46.850626°N 9.531126°E
9103	Oberer Spaniöl House	Oberer Spaniöl House	Kirchgasse 16	759.753	190.659	46.847876°N 9.533393°E
2921	Schwartz House with Garden	Schwartz House with Garden	Jochstrasse 14	759.713	190.614	46.847481°N 9.532853°E
9333	Cantonal Library of Graubünden	Cantonal Library of Graubünden	Karlihofplatz 1	759.801	190.851	46.849591°N 9.534089°E
2925; 8480	Cathedral Saint Mary of the Assumption and Museum	Cathedral Saint Mary of the Assumption and Museum	Hof 18	759.920	190.640	46.847665°N 9.535575°E
2923	Catholic Church St. Luzi	Catholic Church St. Luzi	Alte Schanfiggerstrasse 9	760.039	190.651	46.847735°N 9.537138°E
2949	Crematorium auf dem Totengütli	Crematorium auf dem Totengütli	Sandstrasse 50	760.250	190.060	46.84237°N 9.539696°E
2926	Neues Gebäude (Administration Building)	Neues Gebäude (Administration Building)	Reichsgasse 35	759.771	190.907	46.850102°N 9.533716°E
2929; 8867	Rathaus (Town council house) and City Archive of Chur	Rathaus (Town council house) and City Archive of Chur	Poststrasse 33	759.683	190.781	46.84899°N 9.532518°E
2930; 8478	Rätisches Museum (Haus Buol)	Rätisches Museum (Haus Buol)	Hofstrasse 1 /	759.770	190.690	46.848151°N 9.533627°E
2928	Swiss Reformed Church of St. Martin	Swiss Reformed Church of St. Martin	St. Martinsplatz 10	759.716	190.696	46.848217°N 9.532921°E
8782	Regional Archive of Graubünden	Regional Archive of Graubünden	Karlihofplatz	759.800	190.890	46.849942°N 9.53409°E
2932	Administration Building of the Rhaetian Railway	Administration Building of the Rhaetian Railway	Bahnhofstrasse 25	759.680	191.091	46.851778°N 9.532587°E
2933	Villa Planta and Sulserbau	Villa Planta and Sulserbau	Bahnhofstrasse 35	759.664	191.041	46.851332°N 9.53236°E
2934	Welschdörfli Prehistoric Settlement and Roman Vicus	Welschdörfli; Prehistoric Settlement and Roman Vicus		759.120	190.550	46.847047°N 9.525059°E
3032	Ruins of Alt-Haldenstein Castle	Ruins of Alt-Haldenstein Castle		758.890	194.260	46.880463°N 9.523337°E
3030	Haldenstein Castle	Haldenstein Castle	Schlossweg 4	759.182	194.041	46.878424°N 9.52709°E
Unknown		ISOS Village: Haldenstein				
Unknown		ISOS City: Chur				
Unknown		ISOS Other site: Eidgenössische Pulvermühle (Federal Powder Mill)				

== Churwalden ==
KGS No.^{?}	Picture	Name	Street Address	CH1903 X coordinate	CH1903 Y coordinate	Location
2961	Catholic Church St. Maria and Michael	Catholic Church St. Maria and Michael	Hauptstrasse	760.110	184.160	46.78935°N 9.535794°E
3123	Parpan Castle	Parpan Castle	Mahlerweg 28 / Turrabüel	761.898	181.004	46.760538°N 9.558085°E
10457	Wohnturm of Churwalden Abbey (tower house)	Wohnturm of Churwalden Abbey (tower house)		760.140	184.090	46.788713°N 9.536162°E

== Davos ==
KGS No.^{?}	Picture	Name	Street Address	CH1903 X coordinate	CH1903 Y coordinate	Location
8961		Archive of the Landschaft Davos Municipality, Rathaus (Town council house)		781.900	185.240	46.793466°N 9.821469°E
9049	Berghotel Schatzalp (Formerly Sanatorium)	Berghotel Schatzalp (Formerly Sanatorium)	Schatzalp 878	781.313	186.092	46.801286°N 9.814123°E
2969	Former Grand Hotel Belvédère	Former Grand Hotel Belvédère	Promenade 89	782.286	186.052	46.800661°N 9.826847°E
2968	Grosses Jenatschhaus (Formerly Pfrundhaus)	Grosses Jenatschhaus (Formerly Pfrundhaus)	Museumstrasse 1 a	783.507	186.923	46.808157°N 9.843183°E
8482	Kirchner Museum	Kirchner Museum	Platz, Promenade 82	782.280	185.995	46.80015°N 9.826745°E
10458	Waldfriedhof (Cemetery)	Waldfriedhof (Cemetery)	Wildboden	780.869	182.752	46.771376°N 9.806988°E
2967	Zürcher Höhenklinik	Zürcher Höhenklinik	Klinikstrasse 6 / Clavadel 681	781.500	182.480	46.768759°N 9.815137°E
Unknown		ISOS Dorf: Monstein				

== Disentis/Mustér ==
KGS No.^{?}	Picture	Name	Street Address	CH1903 X coordinate	CH1903 Y coordinate	Location
2986	Catholic Church of St. Gada	Catholic Church of St. Gada	Via Sontga Gada	707.858	172.481	46.694821°N 8.848819°E
2987; 8557; 9303	Abbey of St. Martin	Abbey of St. Martin	Via Claustra 3	708.366	173.800	46.706602°N 8.85577°E
2988	Chaplutta St. Luzi	Chaplutta St. Luzi	Via Disla	709.720	174.340	46.711237°N 8.873602°E
2985	Chaplutta St. Maria	Chaplutta St. Maria	Via Acletta	706.692	173.056	46.70018°N 8.833711°E
10512	Punt Russein (shared with Sumvitg)	Punt Russein (shared with Sumvitg)		711.429	175.539	46.721738°N 8.896239°E
Unknown		ISOS vitg: Segnas				
Unknown		ISOS fracziun: Cavardiras				
Unknown		ISOS fracziun: Disla				

== Domat/Ems ==
KGS No.^{?}	Picture	Name	Street Address	CH1903 X coordinate	CH1903 Y coordinate	Location
2993	Church Catholic St. Gion	Church Catholic St. Gion	Chaplutta E Carner, Crestas	753.460	189.320	46.837316°N 9.450462°E
2994	Chaplutta St. Pieder	Chaplutta St. Pieder	Via Sogn Pieder	753.320	189.090	46.83528°N 9.448551°E

== Domleschg ==
KGS No.^{?}	Picture	Name	Street Address	CH1903 X coordinate	CH1903 Y coordinate	Location
3125	Chapel of St. Lorenz	Chapel of St. Lorenz	Paspels	752.660	180.340	46.756748°N 9.43698°E
3126	Chapel of St. Maria-Magdalena	Chapel of St. Maria-Magdalena	Dusch, Paspels	753.650	180.340	46.75652°N 9.449934°E
3157	Rietberg Castle	Rietberg Castle	Rietberg, Pratval	753.564	178.033	46.735794°N 9.448035°E
3368		Catholic Church of St. Maria E Maurezzi	Hauptstrasse, Tomils	752.780	181.090	46.763465°N 9.438801°E
3369	Ortenstein Castle	Ortenstein Castle	Ortenstein 71, Tomils	752.522	180.672	46.759765°N 9.435285°E
9617	St. Murezzi Early Medieval Church	St. Murezzi; Early Medieval Church	Tomils	753.070	181.050	46.763038°N 9.442582°E
Unknown		ISOS Spezialfall: Paspels				
Unknown		ISOS Dorf: Almens				
Unknown		ISOS Spezialfall: Tumegl /Tomils-Ortenstein				

== Duvin ==
KGS No.^{?}	Picture	Name	Street Address	CH1903 X coordinate	CH1903 Y coordinate	Location
Unknown		ISOS vitg: Duvin				

== Falera ==
KGS No.^{?}	Picture	Name	Street Address	CH1903 X coordinate	CH1903 Y coordinate	Location
2998	Catholic Church St. Rumetg	Catholic Church St. Rumetg	Planezzas St. Rumetg	737.060	184.701	46.799358°N 9.234155°E
9615	Muota e Planezzas (Prehistoric Settlement / Megalithic Site)	Muota e Planezzas (Prehistoric Settlement / Megalithic Site)		737.130	184.743	46.799721°N 9.235085°E

== Felsberg ==
KGS No.^{?}	Picture	Name	Street Address	CH1903 X coordinate	CH1903 Y coordinate	Location
Unknown		ISOS Dorf: Felsberg				

== Fideris ==
KGS No.^{?}	Picture	Name	Street Address	CH1903 X coordinate	CH1903 Y coordinate	Location
3004	Türmlihaus	Türmlihaus	Hauptstrasse 12	775.479	198.602	46.915333°N 9.742546°E
10401		Wohnhaus	Madinis 41	775.784	198.690	46.916043°N 9.746583°E
Unknown		ISOS Dorf: Fideris				

== Fläsch ==
KGS No.^{?}	Picture	Name	Street Address	CH1903 X coordinate	CH1903 Y coordinate	Location
3011	Festung Luziensteig	Festung Luziensteig		758.751	211.785	47.038082°N 9.527637°E
10477	Kleine Schanze	Kleine Schanze	Schanze	759.000	210.840	47.029525°N 9.53058°E
10476	Letzi Grafenberg (Fortification)	Letzi Grafenberg (Fortification)	Talsperre	757.640	212.640	47.046035°N 9.513321°E
Unknown		ISOS Dorf: Fläsch				

== Flims ==
KGS No.^{?}	Picture	Name	Street Address	CH1903 X coordinate	CH1903 Y coordinate	Location
3016	Schlössli (Currently the Municipal Administration Building)	Schlössli (Currently the Municipal Administration Building)	Via dil Casti 2 / Via	740.837	188.883	46.836178°N 9.284906°E
Unknown		ISOS Spezialfall: Flims-Waldhaus				

== Fürstenau ==
KGS No.^{?}	Picture	Name	Street Address	CH1903 X coordinate	CH1903 Y coordinate	Location
3020	Stoffel House	Stoffel House	Schlossgass 65	753.481	176.379	46.72094°N 9.446396°E
10044	Oberes Schloss (Upper Castle) or Schauenstein Castle	Oberes Schloss (Upper Castle) or Schauenstein Castle	Schlossgass 71	753.456	176.421	46.721323°N 9.446083°E
3019	Unteres Schloss (Lower Castle) or Bishop's Castle	Unteres Schloss (Lower Castle) or Bishop's Castle	Schlossgass 70	753.379	176.394	46.721098°N 9.445067°E
Unknown		ISOS Kleinstadt / Flecken: Fürstenau				

== Grono ==
KGS No.^{?}	Picture	Name	Street Address	CH1903 X coordinate	CH1903 Y coordinate	Location
3026	Torre Fiorenzana (Tower)	Torre Fiorenzana (Tower)		731.983	123.528	46.25023°N 9.150185°E
Unknown		ISOS villaggio: Grono con Pont del Ram e S. Clemente				

== Grüsch ==
KGS No.^{?}	Picture	Name	Street Address	CH1903 X coordinate	CH1903 Y coordinate	Location
Unknown		ISOS Dorf: Grüsch / Schmitten (Grüsch, Seewis im Prättigau)				

== Ilanz/Glion ==
KGS No.^{?}	Picture	Name	Street Address	CH1903 X coordinate	CH1903 Y coordinate	Location
3044	Swiss Reformed Church of St. Margreta	Swiss Reformed Church of St. Margreta	Via Porta Cotschna	734.760	181.740	46.773198°N 9.203163°E
3045	Swiss Reformed Church of St. Martin	Swiss Reformed Church of St. Martin	Via Sogn Martin	734.650	181.080	46.767285°N 9.201529°E
3134	Swiss Reformed Church	Swiss Reformed Church	Sumvitg	735.910	177.050	46.730787°N 9.216824°E
Unknown		ISOS Kleinstadt / Flecken: Ilanz				

== Jenins ==
KGS No.^{?}	Picture	Name	Street Address	CH1903 X coordinate	CH1903 Y coordinate	Location
3051	Ruins of Neu-Aspermont Castle	Ruins of Neu-Aspermont Castle		761.710	207.990	47.003243°N 9.565202°E
Unknown		ISOS Dorf: Jenins				

== Klosters-Serneus ==
KGS No.^{?}	Picture	Name	Street Address	CH1903 X coordinate	CH1903 Y coordinate	Location
3053	Swiss Reformed Church	Swiss Reformed Church	Am Platz	786.260	193.920	46.870302°N 9.88209°E

== Küblis ==
KGS No.^{?}	Picture	Name	Street Address	CH1903 X coordinate	CH1903 Y coordinate	Location
9046	Küblis Central Power Plant of the Bündner Kraftwerke	Küblis Central Power Plant of the Bündner Kraftwerke	Büdemji 65 B	778.477	198.505	46.913662°N 9.781847°E
Unknown		ISOS Spezialfall: Village with Kraftwerk				

== La Punt Chamues-ch ==
KGS No.^{?}	Picture	Name	Street Address	CH1903 X coordinate	CH1903 Y coordinate	Location
3164	Chasa Albertini	Chasa Albertini	La Punt 324, 325	790.596	161.683	46.579233°N 9.925525°E
3159	Chesa Merleda	Chesa Merleda	La Punt 345	790.665	161.686	46.57924°N 9.926426°E

== Landquart ==
KGS No.^{?}	Picture	Name	Street Address	CH1903 X coordinate	CH1903 Y coordinate	Location
3039	Marschlins Castle and Surroundings	Marschlins Castle and Surroundings	Gandastrasse	763.324	202.618	46.954543°N 9.584484°E

== Lantsch/Lenz ==
KGS No.^{?}	Picture	Name	Street Address	CH1903 X coordinate	CH1903 Y coordinate	Location
3061	Veglia Catholic Church of S. Maria	Veglia Catholic Church of S. Maria	Cun Santeri, Sumvoi 133	762.170	172.360	46.682744°N 9.558586°E

== Lohn ==
KGS No.^{?}	Picture	Name	Street Address	CH1903 X coordinate	CH1903 Y coordinate	Location
Unknown		ISOS vitg: Lohn				

== Lumnezia ==
KGS No.^{?}	Picture	Name	Street Address	CH1903 X coordinate	CH1903 Y coordinate	Location
10043	Chaplutta St. Bistgaun (Saint Sebastian Chapel)	Chaplutta St. Bistgaun (Saint Sebastian Chapel)	Degen	732.580	174.520	46.708704°N 9.172538°E
3074	Crestaulta E Cresta Petschna (Bronze Age Alpine Settlements)	Crestaulta E Cresta Petschna (Bronze Age Alpine Settlements)		727.940	169.520	46.664643°N 9.110481°E
10402	Chasa dubla	Chasa dubla	Fontauna 30	729.756	171.629	46.68326°N 9.1348°E
10061	Catholic Church of St. Luregn	Catholic Church of St. Luregn		733.186	173.761	46.701758°N 9.180241°E
3389	Catholic Church of St. Vincenz	Catholic Church of St. Vincenz	Pleif	733.060	175.270	46.715354°N 9.179031°E
3412	Catholic Church of St. Maria E Carner	Catholic Church of St. Maria E Carner	Via Principala	727.110	168.450	46.655178°N 9.099342°E
Unknown		ISOS vitg: Lumbrein				
Unknown		ISOS vitg: Degen				
Unknown		ISOS vitg: Tersnaus				
Unknown		ISOS vitg: Vella				
Unknown		ISOS vitg: Vrin				

== Luven ==
KGS No.^{?}	Picture	Name	Street Address	CH1903 X coordinate	CH1903 Y coordinate	Location
Unknown		ISOS vitg: Luven				

== Luzein ==
KGS No.^{?}	Picture	Name	Street Address	CH1903 X coordinate	CH1903 Y coordinate	Location
10489	Ruins of Castels Castle	Ruins of Castels Castle	Putz	775.640	199.650	46.924713°N 9.745064°E
3080	Sprecher-House	Sprecher-House	Rathausgasse 66	777.120	199.300	46.921173°N 9.764351°E
Unknown		ISOS Dorf: Luzein				
Unknown		ISOS Weiler: Putz				

== Maienfeld ==
KGS No.^{?}	Picture	Name	Street Address	CH1903 X coordinate	CH1903 Y coordinate	Location
3084	Brandis Castle	Brandis Castle		759.090	208.270	47.006394°N 9.530862°E
3085	Salenegg Castle	Salenegg Castle	Steigstrasse 21	758.907	208.737	47.010637°N 9.52862°E
Unknown		ISOS Kleinstadt / Flecken: Maienfeld				

== Malans ==
KGS No.^{?}	Picture	Name	Street Address	CH1903 X coordinate	CH1903 Y coordinate	Location
10478	Rohan-Schanze	Rohan-Schanze		761.220	204.760	46.974318°N 9.557614°E
3095	Bothmar Castle with Neighboring Buildings and Park	Bothmar Castle with Neighboring Buildings and Park	Rüfigasse 103	762.572	206.034	46.985444°N 9.575831°E
Unknown		ISOS Dorf: Malans				

== Medel (Lucmagn) ==
KGS No.^{?}	Picture	Name	Street Address	CH1903 X coordinate	CH1903 Y coordinate	Location
Unknown		ISOS vitg: Curaglia				

== Mesocco ==
KGS No.^{?}	Picture	Name	Street Address	CH1903 X coordinate	CH1903 Y coordinate	Location
3109	Mesocco Castle	Mesocco Castle		738.050	138.150	46.380512°N 9.233171°E
3110	Church di St. Maria al Castello	Church di St. Maria al Castello		738.050	138.200	46.380961°N 9.233186°E
Unknown		ISOS villaggio: Mesocco				

== Mutten ==
KGS No.^{?}	Picture	Name	Street Address	CH1903 X coordinate	CH1903 Y coordinate	Location
Unknown	UNESCO World Heritage Site Rhaetian Railway in the Albula / Bernina Landscapes (since 2008)	UNESCO World Heritage Site; Rhaetian Railway in the Albula / Bernina Landscapes (since 2008)				
Unknown		ISOS Weiler: Obermutten				

== Pontresina ==
KGS No.^{?}	Picture	Name	Street Address	CH1903 X coordinate	CH1903 Y coordinate	Location
3135	Swiss Reformed Church of St. Maria Cun Santeri	Swiss Reformed Church of St. Maria Cun Santeri	Giarsun	789.690	151.730	46.490002°N 9.90962°E
3136	Grand Hotel Kronenhof	Grand Hotel Kronenhof	Via Maistra 1	789.040	152.120	46.493692°N 9.901318°E
10048	Tuor Spagnöla	Tuor Spagnöla	Giarsun	789.698	151.655	46.489325°N 9.909693°E
Unknown	UNESCO World Heritage Site Rhaetian Railway in the Albula / Bernina Landscapes (since 2008)	UNESCO World Heritage Site; Rhaetian Railway in the Albula / Bernina Landscapes (since 2008)				
Unknown		ISOS Village urban: Pontresina				

== Poschiavo ==
KGS No.^{?}	Picture	Name	Street Address	CH1903 X coordinate	CH1903 Y coordinate	Location
10049		Casa Tomé	Via Pontonali 218	801.628	133.855	46.325807°N 10.057241°E
3141	Catholic Church di St. Maria Assunta	Catholic Church di St. Maria Assunta	Via da San Maria	801.890	133.270	46.320469°N 10.060387°E
3142	Catholic Collegiate church di St. Vittore	Catholic Collegiate church di St. Vittore	Via dal Cunvent 476	801.710	133.886	46.326061°N 10.058318°E
3143	Catholic Parish church di St. Carlo Borromeo	Catholic Parish church di St. Carlo Borromeo	Via Principale	801.930	135.830	46.343473°N 10.062018°E
3138		Devon House	Via di Palaz 104	801.766	133.578	46.323275°N 10.058911°E
10378		House	Li Curt	802.083	132.241	46.31116°N 10.062444°E
10050	Mulino di Aino Sawmill and Forge	Mulino di Aino; Sawmill and Forge	Privilasco 427	801.759	135.260	46.3384°N 10.05955°E
3140	Palazzo De Bassus Mengotti (Museo)	Palazzo De Bassus Mengotti (Museo)		801.580	133.940	46.326586°N 10.056655°E
9267		Palazzo Dorizzi (Crameri)	Lino, Strada cantonale 473	801.855	135.807	46.343289°N 10.061034°E
3144	Vecchio Monastero con cappella monastica di St. Maria Presentata	Vecchio Monastero con cappella monastica di St. Maria Presentata	Via da Sotsassa	801.777	133.872	46.325915°N 10.059182°E
Unknown	UNESCO World Heritage Site Rhaetian Railway in the Albula / Bernina Landscapes (since 2008)	UNESCO World Heritage Site; Rhaetian Railway in the Albula / Bernina Landscapes (since 2008)				
Unknown		ISOS casale / piccolo villaggio: Cantone				
Unknown		ISOS villaggio: Prada				
Unknown		ISOS villaggio: San Carlo				
Unknown		ISOS borgo : Poschiavo				

== Rhäzüns ==
KGS No.^{?}	Picture	Name	Street Address	CH1903 X coordinate	CH1903 Y coordinate	Location
3168	Catholic Church of St. Georg with Frescoes	Catholic Church of St. Georg with Frescoes		750.390	185.470	46.803396°N 9.408965°E
3169	Catholic Church St. Paul	Catholic Church St. Paul	Via Mulin Sura	749.380	184.580	46.79562°N 9.395447°E

== Rheinwald ==
KGS No.^{?}	Picture	Name	Street Address	CH1903 X coordinate	CH1903 Y coordinate	Location
3035	Alte Landbrücke (Bridge)	Alte Landbrücke (Bridge)	Hinterrhein	735.280	154.579	46.528827°N 9.201976°E
10555	Former Säumerherberge Weiss Kreuz Seamstress Hostel, Weiss Kreuz	Former Säumerherberge Weiss Kreuz; Seamstress Hostel, Weiss Kreuz	Oberdorf 66, Splügen	744.449	157.551	46.553638°N 9.322377°E
Unknown		ISOS Village: Splügen				

== Riom-Parsonz ==
KGS No.^{?}	Picture	Name	Street Address	CH1903 X coordinate	CH1903 Y coordinate	Location
3172	Chastè Da Riom, Riom Castle	Chastè Da Riom, Riom Castle		764.360	164.250	46.609281°N 9.5843°E
Unknown		ISOS vitg: Riom				

== Rossa ==
KGS No.^{?}	Picture	Name	Street Address	CH1903 X coordinate	CH1903 Y coordinate	Location
3177		Catholic Parish Church Di St. Domenica E Ossario		729.630	134.770	46.351793°N 9.122811°E
Unknown		ISOS villaggio: Augio				
Unknown		ISOS villaggio: Rossa				

== Rothenbrunnen ==
KGS No.^{?}	Picture	Name	Street Address	CH1903 X coordinate	CH1903 Y coordinate	Location
10479	Hochjuvalt Castle Ruined Castle / Tower	Hochjuvalt Castle; Ruined Castle / Tower		751.380	182.680	46.778082°N 9.421006°E

== Roveredo ==
KGS No.^{?}	Picture	Name	Street Address	CH1903 X coordinate	CH1903 Y coordinate	Location
3184	Church of Madonna Del Ponte Chiuso	Church of Madonna Del Ponte Chiuso	San Fedele	730.460	121.240	46.22995°N 9.129802°E
Unknown		ISOS villaggio urbanizzato (Roveredo con Ai Rogg				

== Safiental ==
KGS No.^{?}	Picture	Name	Street Address	CH1903 X coordinate	CH1903 Y coordinate	Location
9102	Türelihus	Türelihus	No. 69, Valendas	740.800	183.550	46.788226°N 9.282778°E
3379	House with Stables	House with Stables	Haus Joos, Fraissa	740.700	183.520	46.787978°N 9.28146°E
3342	Swiss Reformed Church	Swiss Reformed Church	Mitte 34, Tenna	745.268	179.112	46.747357°N 9.339867°E
Unknown		ISOS Dorf: Valendas				
Unknown		ISOS Weiler: Brün				

== Sagogn ==
KGS No.^{?}	Picture	Name	Street Address	CH1903 X coordinate	CH1903 Y coordinate	Location
3196	Church Catholic of St. Maria	Church Catholic of St. Maria	Cun Chasa Pravenda, Sil Plaz	738.600	183.580	46.788958°N 9.253983°E
3197	Schiedberg Castle/Bregl da Haida Prehistoric Settlement / Medieval Castle and Church	Schiedberg Castle/Bregl da Haida; Prehistoric Settlement / Medieval Castle and Church		739.550	183.980	46.792357°N 9.266543°E
Unknown		ISOS vitg: Sagogn				

== Samedan ==
KGS No.^{?}	Picture	Name	Street Address	CH1903 X coordinate	CH1903 Y coordinate	Location
10055	Catholic Church of Herz-Jesu	Catholic Church of Herz-Jesu	Surtuor	786.320	156.520	46.534016°N 9.867682°E
9302	Biblioteca da la Fundaziun de Planta	Biblioteca da la Fundaziun de Planta	Mulins 2	786.640	156.572	46.534395°N 9.871872°E
Unknown	UNESCO World Heritage Site Rhaetian Railway in the Albula / Bernina Landscapes (since 2008)	UNESCO World Heritage Site; Rhaetian Railway in the Albula / Bernina Landscapes (since 2008)				
Unknown		ISOS Village urban: Samedan				

== San Vittore ==
KGS No.^{?}	Picture	Name	Street Address	CH1903 X coordinate	CH1903 Y coordinate	Location
3207	Chapel of St. Lucio e dintorni	Chapel of St. Lucio e dintorni	Pala	728.565	122.211	46.239047°N 9.105512°E
3211	Torre di Pala	Torre di Pala	Pala	728.550	122.300	46.239851°N 9.105342°E
Unknown		ISOS villaggio: San Vittore				

== Santa Maria in Calanca ==
KGS No.^{?}	Picture	Name	Street Address	CH1903 X coordinate	CH1903 Y coordinate	Location
3213	Castello or Torre di Sta. Maria	Castello or Torre di Sta. Maria		731.620	124.860	46.26228°N 9.145855°E
3212	Parish Church of St. Maria Assunt	Parish Church of St. Maria Assunt		731.630	124.830	46.262009°N 9.145977°E

== S-chanf ==
KGS No.^{?}	Picture	Name	Street Address	CH1903 X coordinate	CH1903 Y coordinate	Location
10406		Chasa Dubla Cun Stallas E Clavads; Twin Homes and Barn	Susauna 216, 217	795.329	168.217	46.636613°N 9.990011°E
10404		Chasa cun stalla e clavà House with Barn	Bügl Suot 107	795.113	165.531	46.612527°N 9.986052°E
Unknown		ISOS vitg: S-chanf				

== Scharans ==
KGS No.^{?}	Picture	Name	Street Address	CH1903 X coordinate	CH1903 Y coordinate	Location
3239	Bardill House (Formerly Gees House)	Bardill House (Formerly Gees House)	Davos Cresta 37	754.475	175.894	46.716349°N 9.459229°E
Unknown		ISOS Dorf: Scharans				

== Schiers ==
KGS No.^{?}	Picture	Name	Street Address	CH1903 X coordinate	CH1903 Y coordinate	Location
3243	Salginatobel Bridge	Salginatobel Bridge		773.422	205.931	46.981771°N 9.718351°E

== Schluein ==
KGS No.^{?}	Picture	Name	Street Address	CH1903 X coordinate	CH1903 Y coordinate	Location
3246	Catholic Church of Sts. Peter and Paul	Catholic Church of Sts. Peter and Paul	Via Principala	736.643	183.525	46.788867°N 9.228343°E

== Schmitten ==
KGS No.^{?}	Picture	Name	Street Address	CH1903 X coordinate	CH1903 Y coordinate	Location
10499	Schmittentobel-Landwasserviadukt of the Rhaetian Railway	Schmittentobel-Landwasserviadukt of the Rhaetian Railway		771.160	172.400	46.680858°N 9.676059°E
Unknown	UNESCO World Heritage Site Rhaetian Railway in the Albula / Bernina Landscapes (since 2008)	UNESCO World Heritage Site; Rhaetian Railway in the Albula / Bernina Landscapes (since 2008)				

== Scuol ==
KGS No.^{?}	Picture	Name	Street Address	CH1903 X coordinate	CH1903 Y coordinate	Location
3248	Swiss Reformed Church	Swiss Reformed Church	Cun Conturn, Munt Baselgia / Plaz	818.352	186.593	46.794673°N 10.29924°E
10057	Chasa Wieland	Chasa Wieland	Porta 29	818.443	186.642	46.795084°N 10.300454°E
3249		Chasa da cura Bogn Tarasp cun edifizis daspera	Nairs 500	816.577	185.973	46.789679°N 10.275712°E
9611	Steinsberg Castle Prehistoric Settlement / Medieval Castle / Church	Steinsberg Castle; Prehistoric Settlement / Medieval Castle / Church	Ardez	811.240	184.080	46.774376°N 10.204983°E
10379	Dubla cun stallas e clavads House	Dubla cun stallas e clavads House	Fusch 155, Ardez	810.798	184.182	46.775433°N 10.199246°E
3338	Tarasp Castle	Tarasp Castle	Sparsels 140	815.555	184.741	46.778936°N 10.261755°E
3341	Bavetta	Bavetta	Bogn Tarasp	816.840	185.880	46.788758°N 10.27911°E
Unknown		ISOS cas spezial: Tarasp				
Unknown		ISOS cas spezial: Vulpera				
Unknown		ISOS vitg: Ardez				
Unknown		ISOS fracziun: Bos-cha				
Unknown		ISOS fracziun: Sur En				
Unknown		ISOS Village urban: Scuol				
Unknown		ISOS vitg: Guarda				
Unknown		ISOS vitg: Sent				

== Seewis im Prättigau ==
KGS No.^{?}	Picture	Name	Street Address	CH1903 X coordinate	CH1903 Y coordinate	Location
3256	Ruins of Fracstein Castle	Ruins of Fracstein Castle		765.580	205.050	46.975852°N 9.614996°E
Unknown		ISOS Dorf: Seewis im Prättigau				
Unknown		ISOS Dorf: Grüsch / Schmitten (Grüsch				

== Sils im Domleschg ==
KGS No.^{?}	Picture	Name	Street Address	CH1903 X coordinate	CH1903 Y coordinate	Location
10058	Ehrenfels Castle	Ehrenfels Castle		753.960	173.700	46.696738°N 9.45176°E
3270	Carschenna Prehistoric Petroglyphs	Carschenna; Prehistoric Petroglyphs		754.500	173.400	46.693916°N 9.458716°E
3271	Ruins of Hohenrätien Castle	Ruins of Hohenrätien Castle		753.430	173.140	46.691825°N 9.444645°E
3269	Ruins of Campell or Campi Castle	Ruins of Campell or Campi Castle		755.440	174.180	46.700712°N 9.471265°E
Unknown	UNESCO World Heritage Site Rhaetian Railway in the Albula / Bernina Landscapes (since 2008)	UNESCO World Heritage Site; Rhaetian Railway in the Albula / Bernina Landscapes (since 2008)				
Unknown		ISOS Spezialfall: Campi				
Unknown		ISOS Spezialfall: Sils im Domleschg				

== Soazza ==
KGS No.^{?}	Picture	Name	Street Address	CH1903 X coordinate	CH1903 Y coordinate	Location
10059		Casa Paret	Ospizi 114	737.155	136.513	46.365973°N 9.221058°E
3284	Catholic Parish Church of St. Martino	Catholic Parish Church of St. Martino	ossario e oratorio della Madonna Addolorata	737.350	136.280	46.363838°N 9.223522°E
3286		Ospizio e Via Crucis	Ospizi 118	737.118	136.506	46.365918°N 9.220575°E
Unknown		ISOS villaggio: Soazza				

== St. Antönien ==
KGS No.^{?}	Picture	Name	Street Address	CH1903 X coordinate	CH1903 Y coordinate	Location
10405		House with Barn	Berawis 68	780.504	203.811	46.960822°N 9.81055°E

== St. Moritz ==
KGS No.^{?}	Picture	Name	Street Address	CH1903 X coordinate	CH1903 Y coordinate	Location
3303; 8607	Segantini Museum	Segantini Museum	Via Somplaz 30	783.818	151.851	46.492728°N 9.833225°E
Unknown	UNESCO World Heritage Site Rhaetian Railway in the Albula / Bernina Landscapes (since 2008)	UNESCO World Heritage Site; Rhaetian Railway in the Albula / Bernina Landscapes (since 2008)				

== Stierva ==
KGS No.^{?}	Picture	Name	Street Address	CH1903 X coordinate	CH1903 Y coordinate	Location
Unknown		ISOS vitg: Stierva				

== Sumvitg ==
KGS No.^{?}	Picture	Name	Street Address	CH1903 X coordinate	CH1903 Y coordinate	Location
9070	Punt Russein (Shared with Disentis/Mustér)	Punt Russein (Shared with Disentis/Mustér)		711.429	175.539	46.721738°N 8.896239°E
Unknown		ISOS vitg: Sumvitg				

== Surava ==
KGS No.^{?}	Picture	Name	Street Address	CH1903 X coordinate	CH1903 Y coordinate	Location
Unknown	UNESCO World Heritage Site Rhaetian Railway in the Albula / Bernina Landscapes (since 2008)	UNESCO World Heritage Site; Rhaetian Railway in the Albula / Bernina Landscapes (since 2008)				

== Surses ==
KGS No.^{?}	Picture	Name	Street Address	CH1903 X coordinate	CH1903 Y coordinate	Location
2873	Julier Pass Roman Religious Center / Mountain Pass	Julier Pass; Roman Religious Center / Mountain Pass	Bivio	775.820	149.340	46.472297°N 9.728142°E
3172	Riom Castle	Riom Castle	Riom-Parsonz	764.360	164.250	46.609281°N 9.5843°E
3203		Chasa Fontana	No. 26, Salouf	763.686	165.946	46.624698°N 9.576109°E
3220	Catholic Church of St. Martegn	Catholic Church of St. Martegn	Veia Son Martegn, Savognin	765.000	162.290	46.591499°N 9.591949°E
3221		Padnal / Mot la Cresta; Bronze Age Alpine Settlement	Savognin	766.100	162.370	46.591946°N 9.606326°E
3350	Catholic Church of S. Plasch Cun Chasa Pravenda	Catholic Church of S. Plasch Cun Chasa Pravenda	Julierstrasse 57, Tinizong-Rona	766.907	161.388	46.582915°N 9.616496°E
9529		Chasa Cresta	Sumvei 5, Tinizong-Rona	767.271	161.083	46.580081°N 9.621132°E
Unknown		ISOS vitg: Riom				
Unknown		ISOS vitg: Salouf				

== Susch ==
KGS No.^{?}	Picture	Name	Street Address	CH1903 X coordinate	CH1903 Y coordinate	Location
3332	Fortezza (Schanzen)	Fortezza (Schanzen)		802.050	180.864	46.748315°N 10.083306°E

== Tamins ==
KGS No.^{?}	Picture	Name	Street Address	CH1903 X coordinate	CH1903 Y coordinate	Location
Unknown		ISOS Dorf: Tamins				
Unknown		ISOS Spezialfall: Reichenau				

== Thusis ==
KGS No.^{?}	Picture	Name	Street Address	CH1903 X coordinate	CH1903 Y coordinate	Location
Unknown	UNESCO World Heritage Site Rhaetian Railway in the Albula / Bernina Landscapes (since 2008)	UNESCO World Heritage Site; Rhaetian Railway in the Albula / Bernina Landscapes (since 2008)				

== Trin ==
KGS No.^{?}	Picture	Name	Street Address	CH1903 X coordinate	CH1903 Y coordinate	Location
3353	Crap Sogn Parcazi Ruined Castle and Fortified Church	Crap Sogn Parcazi; Ruined Castle and Fortified Church		745.850	188.230	46.829226°N 9.350389°E

== Trun ==
KGS No.^{?}	Picture	Name	Street Address	CH1903 X coordinate	CH1903 Y coordinate	Location
3354	Cuort Ligia Grischa	Cuort Ligia Grischa	Via Principala 74	718.071	177.976	46.742513°N 8.983729°E
Unknown		ISOS Village urban: Trun				
Unknown		ISOS vitg: Schlans				

== Untervaz ==
KGS No.^{?}	Picture	Name	Street Address	CH1903 X coordinate	CH1903 Y coordinate	Location
3370	Ruins of Neuburg Castle	Ruins of Neuburg Castle		760.390	197.890	46.912744°N 9.544287°E

== Val Müstair ==
KGS No.^{?}	Picture	Name	Street Address	CH1903 X coordinate	CH1903 Y coordinate	Location
3118	Benedictine Convent of Saint John	Benedictine Convent of Saint John	Via Maistra	830.450	168.660	46.629398°N 10.448564°E
Unknown	UNESCO World Heritage Site Benedictine Convent of Saint John (since 1983)	UNESCO World Heritage Site; Benedictine Convent of Saint John (since 1983)				
Unknown		ISOS Village urban: Müstair				
Unknown		ISOS vitg: Santa Maria Val Müstair				

== Vals ==
KGS No.^{?}	Picture	Name	Street Address	CH1903 X coordinate	CH1903 Y coordinate	Location
10407	Double House	Double House	Platz 81	733.431	164.423	46.617729°N 9.180732°E

== Valsot ==
KGS No.^{?}	Picture	Name	Street Address	CH1903 X coordinate	CH1903 Y coordinate	Location
3166	Chastè Da Tschanüff Tschanüff Castle	Chastè Da Tschanüff; Tschanüff Castle		824.020	191.080	46.833124°N 10.375629°E
3167		Mottata, Prehistoric Alpine Settlement / Cultivated Terraces		825.880	191.780	46.838787°N 10.400338°E
3165	Swiss Reformed Church of St. Flurin	Swiss Reformed Church of St. Flurin	Sot Baselgia	824.521	191.215	46.834169°N 10.382258°E
10064	Museum Stamparia Da Strada	Museum Stamparia Da Strada	Strada 154	828.320	194.470	46.862134°N 10.433648°E
Unknown		ISOS vitg: Ramosch				
Unknown		ISOS vitg: Tschlin				

== Vaz/Obervaz ==
KGS No.^{?}	Picture	Name	Street Address	CH1903 X coordinate	CH1903 Y coordinate	Location
3385		Catholic Church of St. Leza	Pizzogna	759.920	173.940	46.697495°N 9.529738°E
10066		Chasa Kessler	Voa Pas-cheus 65	759.517	173.341	46.692205°N 9.524262°E
Unknown	UNESCO World Heritage Site Rhaetian Railway in the Albula / Bernina Landscapes (since 2008)	UNESCO World Heritage Site; Rhaetian Railway in the Albula / Bernina Landscapes (since 2008)				

== Waltensburg/Vuorz ==
KGS No.^{?}	Picture	Name	Street Address	CH1903 X coordinate	CH1903 Y coordinate	Location
3415	Swiss Reformed Church of Waltensburg / Vuorz with Frescos	Swiss Reformed Church of Waltensburg / Vuorz with Frescos	Demvitg 40	728.210	182.030	46.777099°N 9.117506°E
9618	Munt St. Gieri (Jörgenberg Castle) Prehistoric Settlement / Medieval Castle	Munt St. Gieri (Jörgenberg Castle); Prehistoric Settlement / Medieval Castle		729.780	182.440	46.780482°N 9.138175°E
10067	Execution site	Execution site		729.410	182.170	46.778126°N 9.133254°E
3419	Ruina Grotta (ruins of Kropfenstein Castle)	Ruina Grotta (ruins of Kropfenstein Castle)		726.990	181.200	46.769868°N 9.101305°E
Unknown		ISOS vitg: Waltensburg				

== Zernez ==
KGS No.^{?}	Picture	Name	Street Address	CH1903 X coordinate	CH1903 Y coordinate	Location
3067	Abandoned village of Gonda	Abandoned village of Gonda	Lavin	805.270	183.730	46.773096°N 10.126706°E
3422	Swiss Reformed Church	Swiss Reformed Church	Viel Dal Gallas	803.230	175.680	46.70135°N 10.096439°E
3423	Chastè da Wildenberg (Wildenberg Castle)	Chastè da Wildenberg (Wildenberg Castle)	Via Suot 124 / Runtasch	803.220	175.502	46.699753°N 10.09623°E
9128	Palazzo Bezzola	Palazzo Bezzola	Chasa da Plaz 88	803.100	175.591	46.700589°N 10.094701°E
3427		Execution site		801.940	178.520	46.727275°N 10.080833°E
Unknown		ISOS Village urban: Zernez				
Unknown		ISOS village: Lavin				

== Zillis-Reischen ==
KGS No.^{?}	Picture	Name	Street Address	CH1903 X coordinate	CH1903 Y coordinate	Location
3430	Swiss Reformed Church of S. Martegn/St Martin	Swiss Reformed Church of S. Martegn/St Martin		753.364	166.738	46.634269°N 9.441645°E
9619		Cave under Hasenstein (a Roman cult site)		753.300	166.360	46.630885°N 9.440684°E
9516		Wildener and Premoli Bridges		753.801	169.835	46.662019°N 9.448387°E
Unknown		ISOS vitg: Zillis				
Unknown		ISOS fracziun: Reischen				

== Zizers ==
KGS No.^{?}	Picture	Name	Street Address	CH1903 X coordinate	CH1903 Y coordinate	Location
3434	Upper Castle Zizers with Garden	Upper Castle Zizers with Garden	Oberschloss Weg / Stöcklistrasse	762.090	200.360	46.934542°N 9.567474°E
3435	Lower Castle Zizers (also known as Johannesstift) with Garden	Lower Castle Zizers (also known as Johannesstift) with Garden	Vialstrasse 16, 18	761.916	200.289	46.933946°N 9.565164°E

== Zuoz ==
KGS No.^{?}	Picture	Name	Street Address	CH1903 X coordinate	CH1903 Y coordinate	Location
3439	Chaplutta St. Bastiaun	Chaplutta St. Bastiaun		793.100	164.040	46.599706°N 9.959163°E
3440	Chasa Pult	Chasa Pult	Plazzet / Aguel 37	793.108	164.434	46.603246°N 9.959432°E
