= Alt-Haldenstein Castle =

Castle in Switzerland

Alt-Haldenstein
- Ruine Haldenstein
- Haldenstein
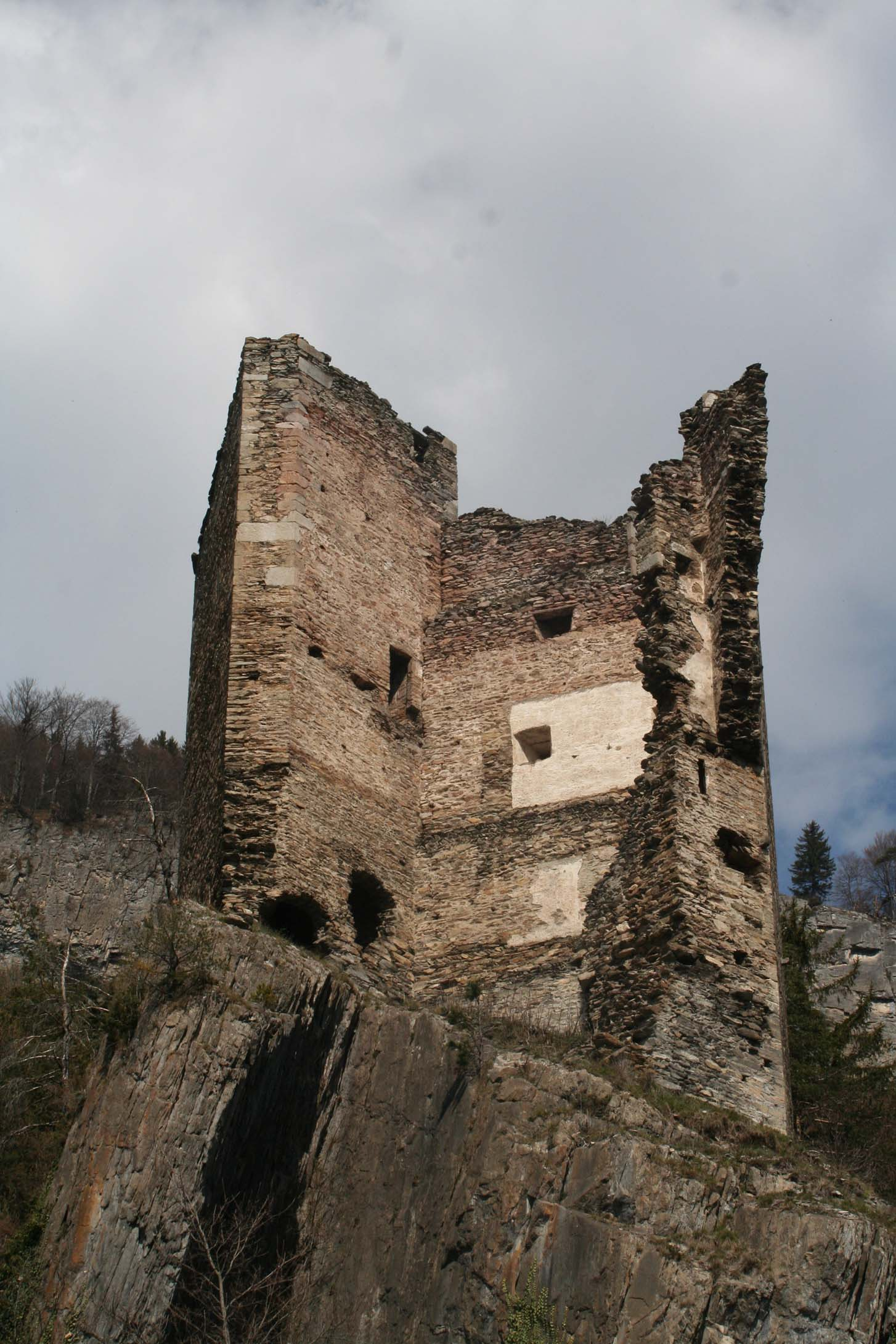
- Ruins of Alt-Haldenstein

Site information
- Type: Rock castle
- Code: CH-GR
- Condition: ruin

Location
- Coordinates: 46.880556°N 9.523333°E
- Height: 630 m

Site history
- Built: around 1100 to 1299
- Materials: rubble stone

Garrison information
- Occupants: Ministerialis of Haldenstein

Alt-Haldenstein Castle is a castle in the municipality of Haldenstein of the Canton of Graubünden in Switzerland. It is a Swiss heritage site of national significance.

== History ==
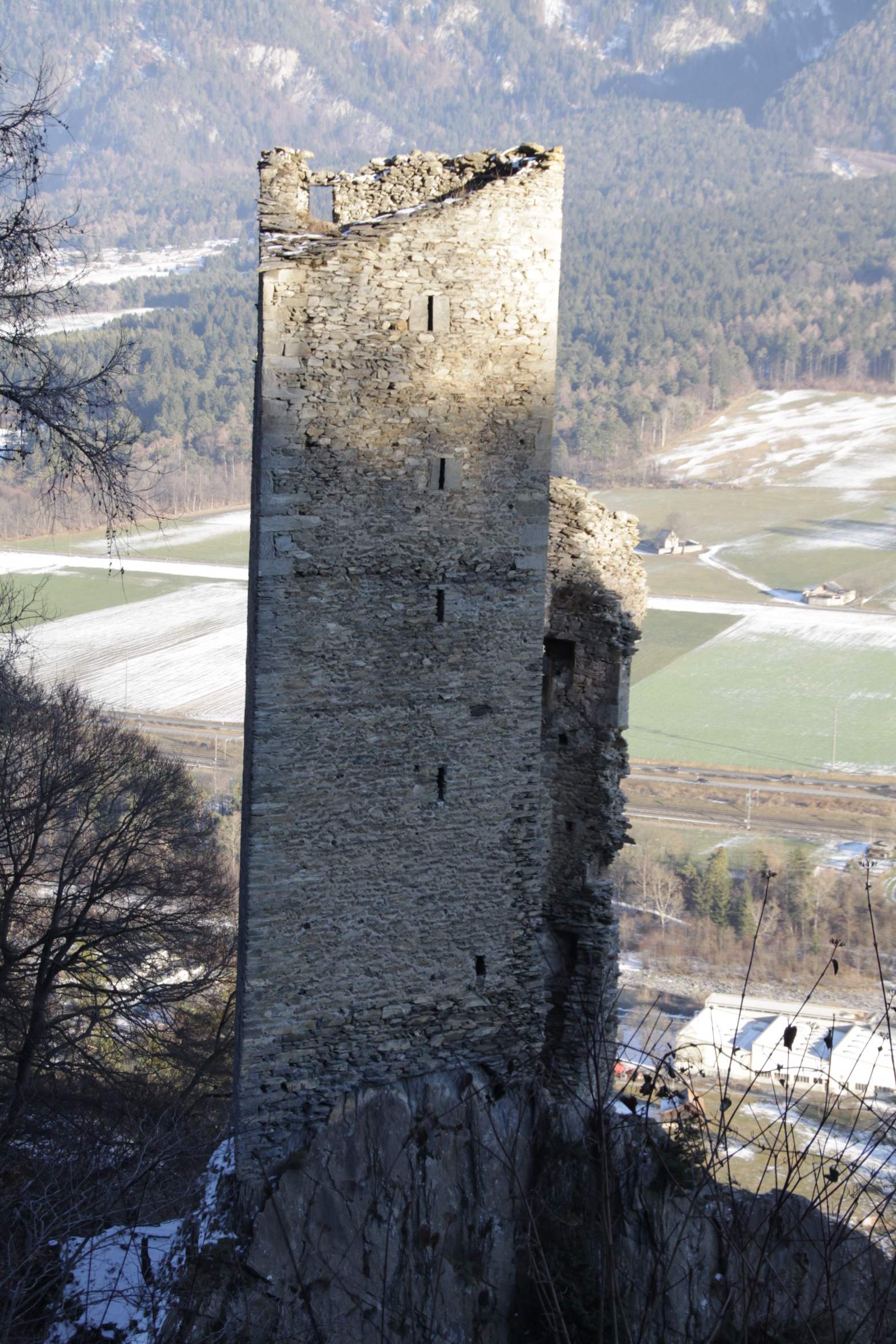
Alt-Haldenstein Castle

Haldenstein Castle was probably built in the 10th or 11th century as the family castle of the Ministerialis Haldenstein family, who were in service of the Lord of Vaz. By the 12th century the family had split into two lines, the Haldenstein family and the Lichtenstein family (who inhabited the nearby Lichtenstein Castle. Each family ruled over part of the nearby village and farms. By the end of the 13th century the Lichtenstein family died out and their lands and castle were inherited by the Haldensteins. In 1299 Johann von Vaz and the Bishop of Chur quarreled over an unauthorized expansion of Haldenstein Castle. By the 14th century the Lord of Haldenstein was in the service of the Bishop. In 1362 Ulrich von Haldenstein was a soldier in Habsburg service, though in 1379 he was again in the service of the Bishop of Chur.

The Haldenstein family died out around the end of the 14th century. At this point the castle passed through a number of owners. In 1542 the widow of Jacques von Marmels married a French minister named Johann Jacob von Castion and he became the owner of Haldenstein. He quickly moved from the cramped and inconvenient castle down into Haldenstein and built the new Haldenstein Castle near the town. The old castle became known as Alt (Old)-Haldenstein. The old castle was sold to Gregor von Hohenbalken, the Lord of Aspermont, in 1567. In 1608 it was sold to the Scheuenstein family and later the Salis-Maienfelds occupied the castle. It was damaged in an earthquake in 1769 and again in 1787 and it was abandoned in the following years.

== Castle site ==
The castle was built on a small rocky outcropping above the valley below the Calanda massif. Due to the small size of the outcropping, the castle site is compact without outbuildings or curtain walls. Over the centuries the tower's height increased in several stages as the owners expanded in the only direction they could, upward. Several building phases can still be seen in the remaining tower walls.

The castle site can only be reached by following a narrow and steep trail along the mountain to the castle outcropping.

== See also ==
- List of castles in Switzerland
