= Lichtenstein Castle =

Lichtenstein Castle may refer to the following castles:

== Austria ==
- Liechtenstein Castle (Maria Enzersdorf), near Maria Enzersdorf in Lower Austria, bordering Vienna
- Schloss Liechtenstein (Maria Enzersdorf), near Maria Enzersdorf as well

== Germany ==
- Lichtenstein Castle (Württemberg) near Lichtenstein-Honau, Baden-Württemberg
- Lichtenstein Castle (Lower Franconia) in the municipality of Pfarrweisach, Lower Franconia, Bavaria
- Lichtenstein Castle (Greifenstein) in the municipality of Greifenstein, Hesse

== Switzerland ==
- Lichtenstein Castle (Graubünden), in the municipality of Haldenstein, Canton of Graubünden

== Estates of the House of Liechtenstein ==
- Lednice–Valtice Cultural Landscape in Czechia
- Stadtpalais Liechtenstein and Liechtenstein Garden Palace in Vienna, Austria
- Vaduz Castle in Liechtenstein
