= Berghotel Schatzalp =

Hotel building in Switzerland

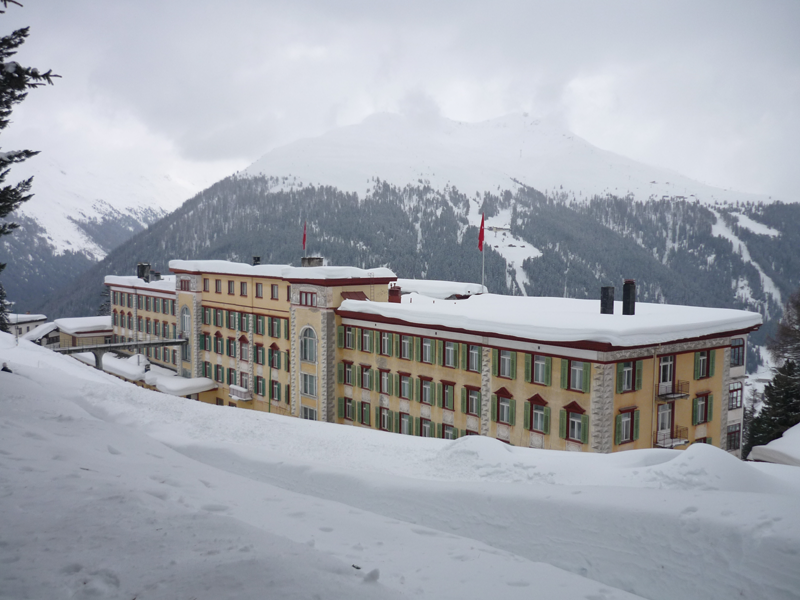
- Berghotel Schatzalp in March 2009
- Interactive map of the Berghotel Schatzalp area

General information
- Location: Davos, Switzerland
- Coordinates: 46°48′04″N 9°48′50″E
- Opening: 21 December 1900 (as a sanitorium), 1953 (as a hotel)

Design and construction
- Architects: Otto Pfleghard and Max Haefeli
- Developer: Willem Jan Holsboer (original developer)

Other information
- Number of rooms: 92
- Number of restaurants: 4

Website
- Official site

Berghotel Schatzalp is a historic hotel built in the Art Nouveau style and listed Cultural Property of National Significance in Davos, eastern Switzerland. It is located above the western side of Davos at 1,860 metres (6,100 ft) above sea level on the historic path over the Strela Pass, and forms part of the Schatzalp skiing and recreational area, near the Rinerhorn. Schatzalp is accessed via the funicular Schatzalp-Bahn from the town of Davos below.

As former hi-tech tuberculosis sanitorium, it was opened as the hotel Berghotel Schatzalp in 1953. The hotel caters to global economic and political leaders during the World Economic Forum Annual Meetings in the third week of January, when it is described by The Telegraph as "the most fashionable place in town, or above it, for a private party."

== History ==
The building was built under the instructions of Dutch entrepreneur Willem Jan Holsboer between 1898 and 1900 by Zürich-based architects Otto Pfleghard and Max Haefeli. It was inaugurated on 21 December 1900 as a state-of-the-art tuberculosis sanitorium. It was built in an ideal location, with the Schatzalp area receiving more sunlight than the town below, and was built facing south to optimise exposure to natural light. The construction of the Davos-Schatzalp railroad took place from April 29 to December 25, 1899 and facilitated the opening of the sanitorium.

The sanitorium is a setting in Thomas Mann's 1924 novel The Magic Mountain, which tells the story of a young engineer, Hans Castorp, who visits his sick cousin at the tuberculosis sanatorium, and ends up staying in Davos for seven years. At the beginning of the novel it is described as "the highest of the sanatoriums", built so far up the mountain that "they have to bring their bodies down on bobsleds, in the winter." The hotel uses the affiliation with the novel for promotional purposes.

In the summer of 1937, the first ski lift at Schatzalp was built by the Schatzalp-Strela cable car cooperative.

Schatzalp remained a sanatorium until 1953, when it was converted to a resort hotel, as detailed in the minutes of shareholders' meetings from 1952-1953. Its chief surgeon, Dr Gustav Maurer, was an outspoken opponent of Nazism [The Fallacy of Race and the Shoah, Kramer and Headland), as was Grand Duke Dmitri Pavlovich (Romanov), a patient who died at Schatzalp on 5 March 1942. ["Leben und Sterben in Davos", William Lee, Davoser Revue, 2000]. The Grand Duke's diaries provide a detailed view of daily life at Schatzalp.

In 1997, the International Council on Monuments in cooperation with GastroSuisse awarded the hotel the "Historic Hotel of the Year" Award. In September 2007, a ten-member jury awarded the hotel the Davos Platz prize for 2008.

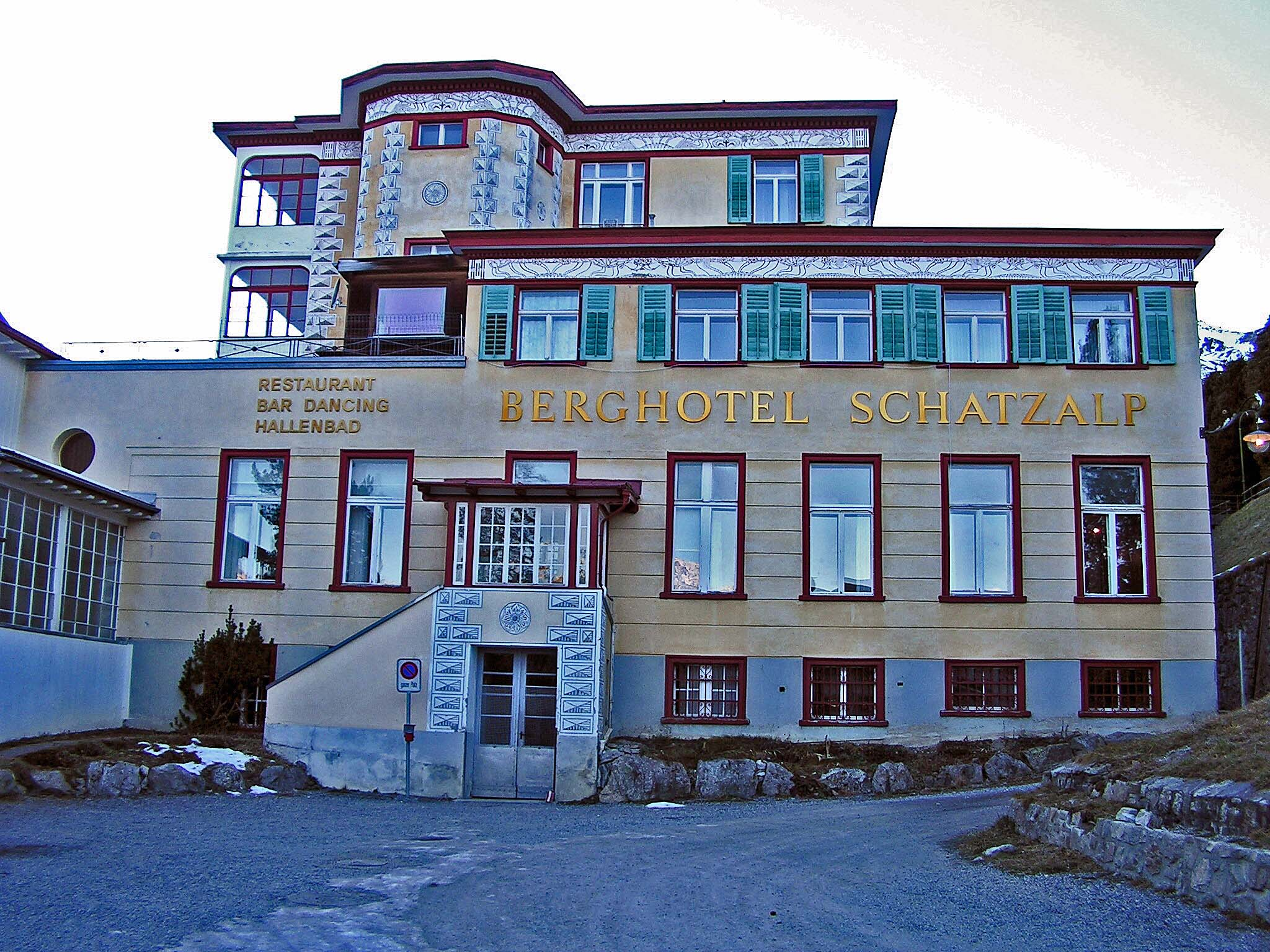
Exterior of the Berghotel Schatzalp

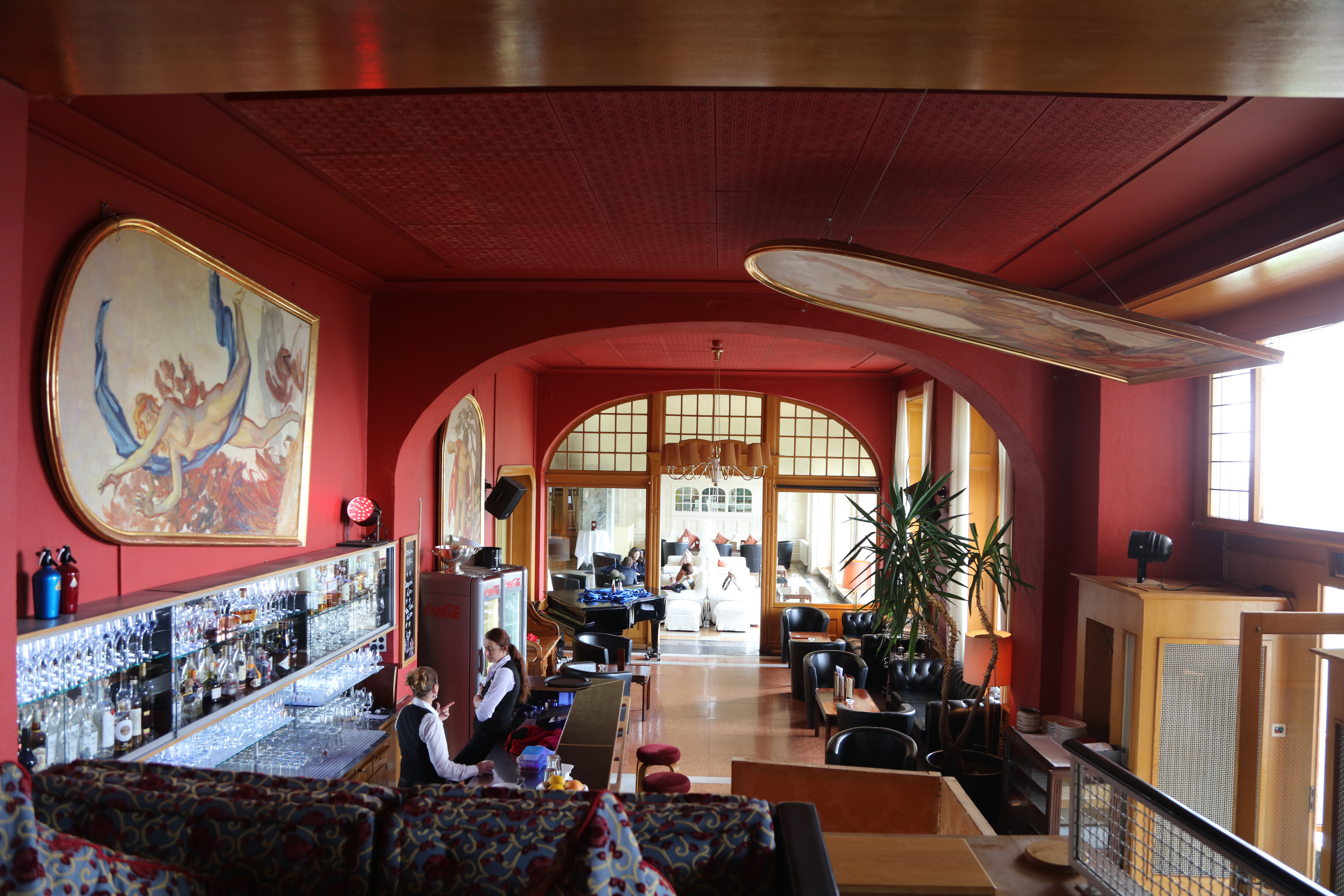
The piano bar of the Berghotel Schatzalp

The Schatzalp/Strela ski area was temporarily closed down in 2002 as it was no longer profitable, though the funicular and the two toboggan runs remained in operation. One chairlift and one ski lift have been in operation again since the 2009/2010 season, when a decelerated skiing area was created. The second ski lift and the connecting lift to Parsenn remain closed.

On the opening day of the World Economic Forum Annual Meeting in January 2023, some 50 leaders including Klaus Schwab, head of the WEF, Antonio Neri, the CEO of Hewlett-Packard, US senators Joe Manchin, Chris Coons and Kyrsten Sinema and Georgia governor Brian Kemp, met together for a private lunch in the Bell Epoque restaurant of the hotel.

== Architecture and interior design ==
The hotel is built in the Art Nouveau style and is a listed Cultural Property of National Significance for Graubünden. The hotel has 92 rooms, and the rooms on the south side of the hotel, facing the sun, all have balconies. The hotel retains Jugendstil features and period furnishings in the bathrooms.

On the ground floor are the reception, lobby, and dining room, which has Art Nouveau adornments. Above the fireplace in the lounge is a red and green stained glass window with a cross, with tree paintings above it which read "Anno domini 1900". In the dining room are multiple large paintings which are separated but form a panorama. A bar, named the "X-Ray Bar" is named after what was the X-Ray room of the sanitorium. The main staircase to the hotel has white and red steps.

The restaurants at Berghotel Schatzalp include Belle Epoque, Snow Beach, Panorama, and Strela Pass, and there is also a piano bar.

The Villa Guarda, adjacent to the botanical garden on the property, was built in 1907 and underwent restoration in 2008. Chalet Schatzalp, in the middle of the surrounding forest park, was entirely rebuilt with wood in 2008.

== Alpinum ==
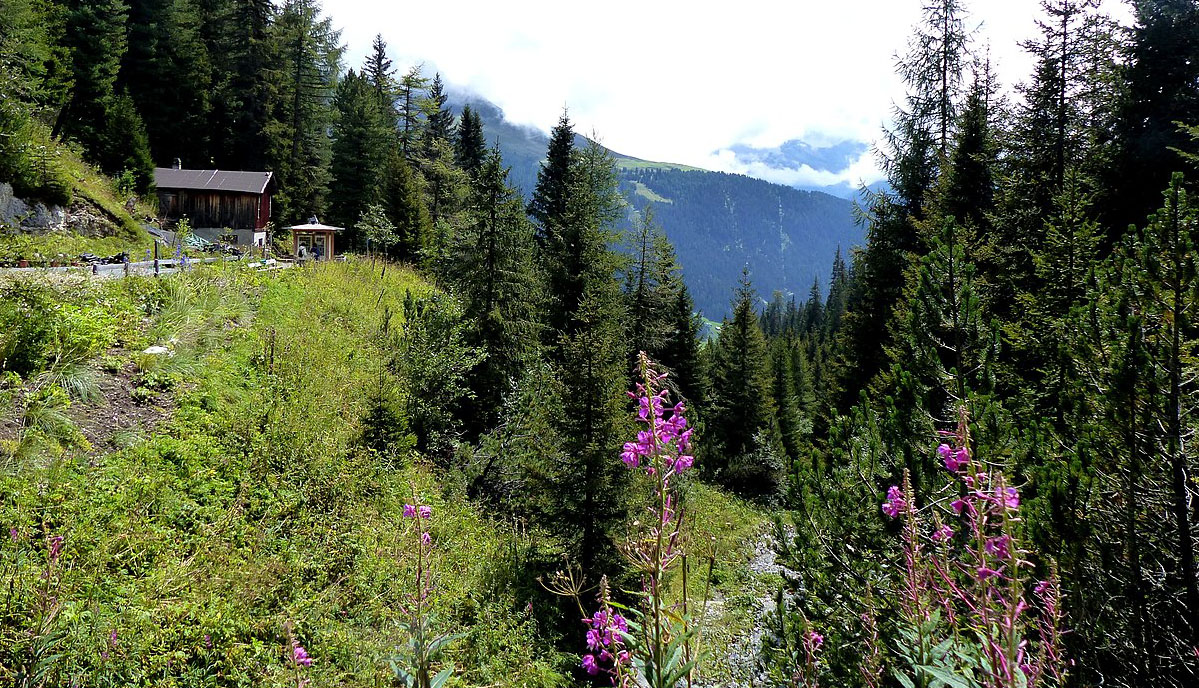
The alpinum

The Alpinum botanical garden is located northwest of the hotel in the valley of the Guggerbach stream, a short walk from the hotel. The Alpinum, which has about 3500 species of plants, from as far afield as Nepal and Tibet, was created in the early years of the sanatorium by Dr. Edward Neumann and is open from mid-May to mid-October.

== See also ==
- List of hotels in Switzerland
- Tourism in Switzerland
