= Grand Hotel Kronenhof =

Historic hotel in Pontresina, Switzerland

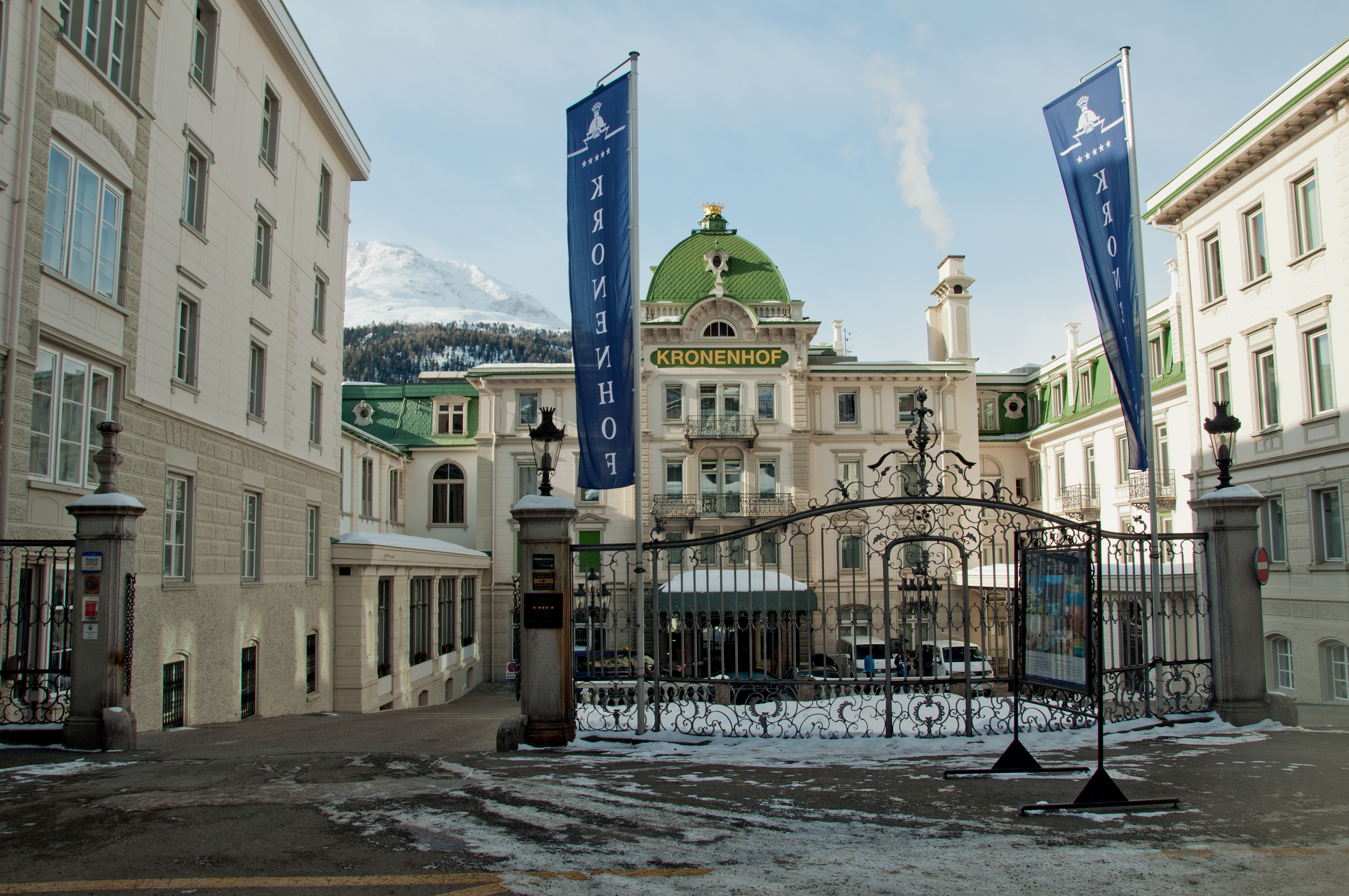
- Grand Hotel Kronenhof

General information
- Location: Via Maistra 130; 7504 Pontresina GR; Switzerland
- Coordinates: 46°29′37″N 09°54′05″E
- Opening: 1848
- Owner: Grand Hotels Engadinerkulm

Design and construction
- Architect: Jakob and Georg Ragaz
- Developer: Lorenz Gredig

Website
- Grand Hotel Kronenhof

The Grand Hotel Kronenhof is a historic five-star Belle Epoque-era Grand Hotel in Pontresina, Upper Engadin, Switzerland.

The hotel is situated in the Laret quarter of the village, adjacent to the San Niculò protestant church, and is included in the Swiss Inventory of Cultural Property of National and Regional Significance.

For over 140 years, the hotel was owned by its founding family, the Gredigs.

== History ==
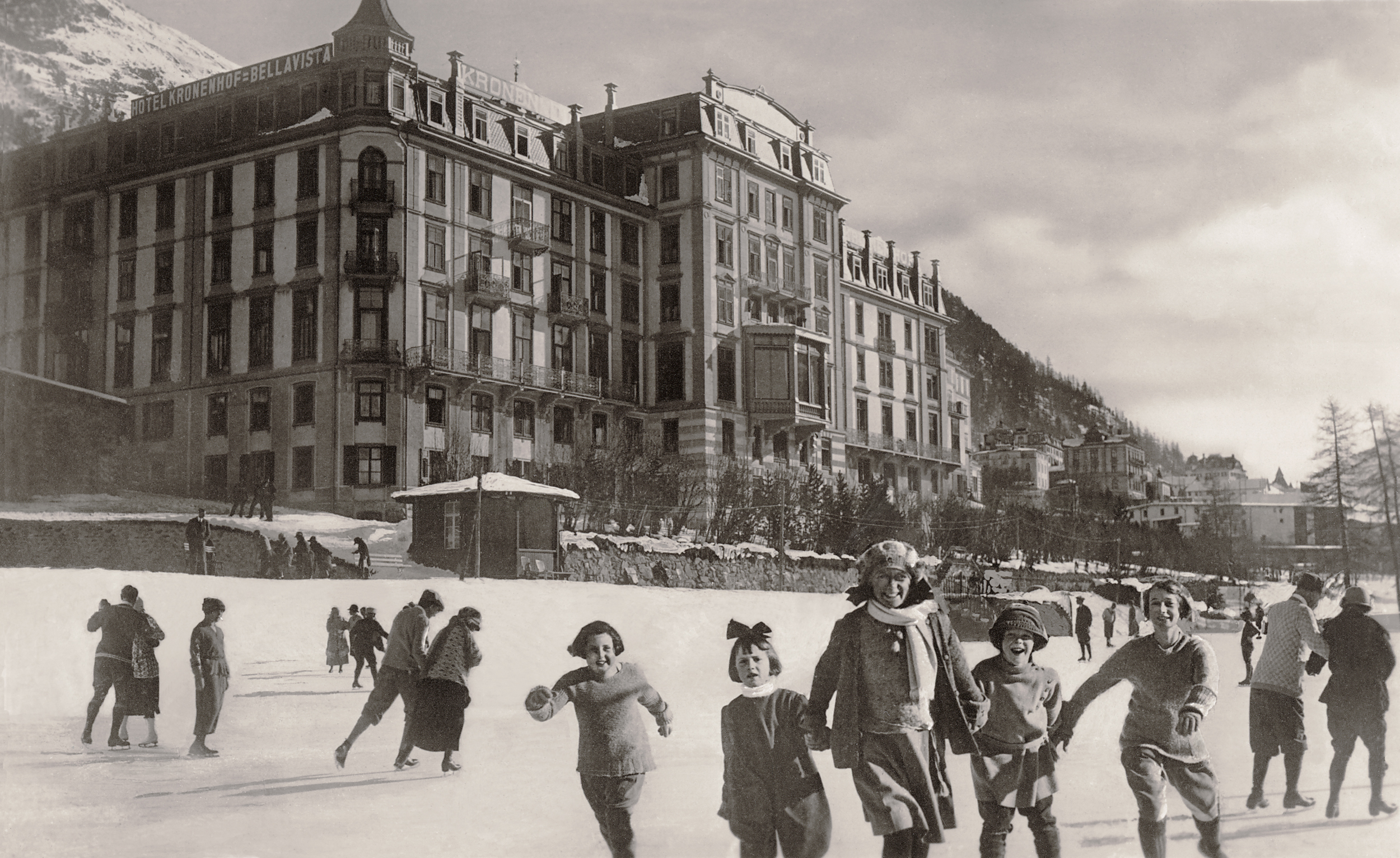
Historical photo of the Grand Hotel Kronenhof

In 1848, Andreas Gredig (1806–1877) acquired the Gasthaus Rössli for his son Lorenz Gredig (1829–1905). The guesthouse business included a wine shop. Lorenz Gredig initially named the business "Gasthaus zur Krone-Post", but later changed the name to "Krone". Over time, by constructing additions and incorporating existing outbuildings, he also steadily enlarged the guesthouse and transformed it into a hotel.

Between 1896 and 1898, the architects Jakob and Georg Ragaz expanded the hotel into a representative, horseshoe-shaped three-winged structure. Since then, it has had a Cour d'honneur (three sided courtyard) dominated by a crowned dome, which still surmounts the main entrance of the hotel and its neo-baroque-style light-bathed entrance hall.

At the time of the expansion, the hotel's name was changed to "Grand Hotel Kronenhof und Bellavista", from which its present name, "Grand Hotel Kronenhof", was later derived.

The outbreak of World War I in 1914 put an abrupt end to further expansion plans. The war and crisis years impacted the hotel's profitability, but its survival was secured by the wine shop, which was still trading, and agriculture.

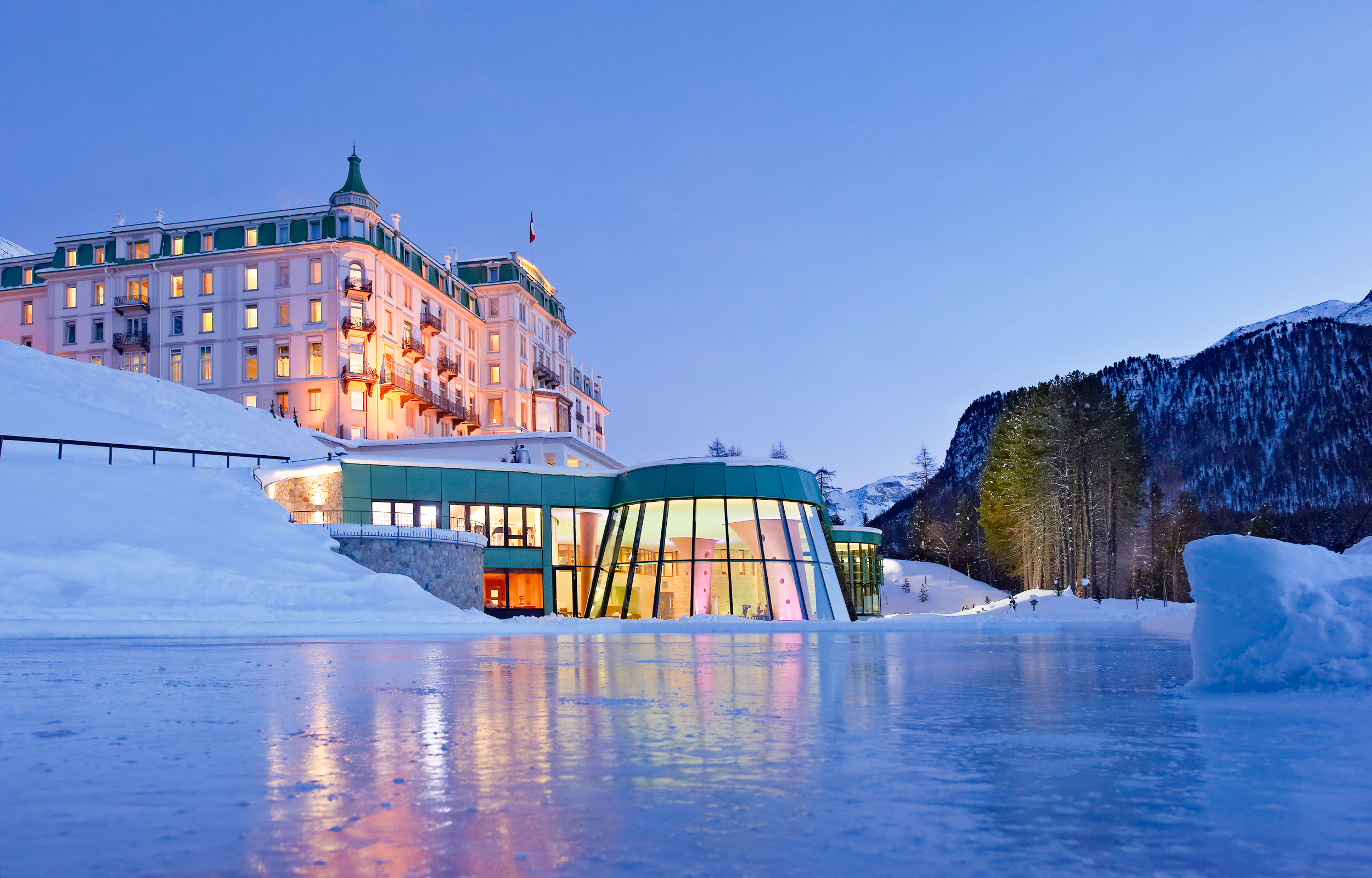
Grand Hotel Kronenhof Exterior Winter

In 1989, the heirs of the founding Gredig family sold the hotel to two Swiss private investors. In 2004, the two investors, in turn, sold it to the "Grand Hotels Engadinerkulm" company, which also owns the historic "Hotel Kulm" in St. Moritz. Extensive renovation work was begun that year, but the hotel's original Belle Epoque exterior and interior have both been largely preserved.

Heinz E. and Jenny Hunkeler took over the leadership of the Kronenhof in October 2006. In September 2006 gigantic construction works were started, including a 100 spaces new underground garage, 28 additional guest rooms and a more than 2000qm large spa-complex. From April 2007 until November 2007 the hotel was completely closed. In addition the reconstruction of the staff- accommodation and the kitchen took place. Since the creation of the three-wing-layout of the hotel in the last century, no project to expand had been as big and significant as this.

Marc Eichenberger took over the management of the Grand Hotel Kronenhof in 2013, and in 2014, the hotel was named as the best hotel in the world in TripAdvisor's annual Travellers' Choice Awards. In 2015 he initialised the extension and modernisation of the ski room. Thirteen double rooms and junior suites were refurbished in 2016, by French star architect Pierre-Yves Rochon.

== See also ==
- List of hotels in Switzerland
- Tourism in Switzerland
