= Bothmar Castle =

Castle in Malans, Switzerland

Coordinates: 46°59′08″N 9°34′33″E

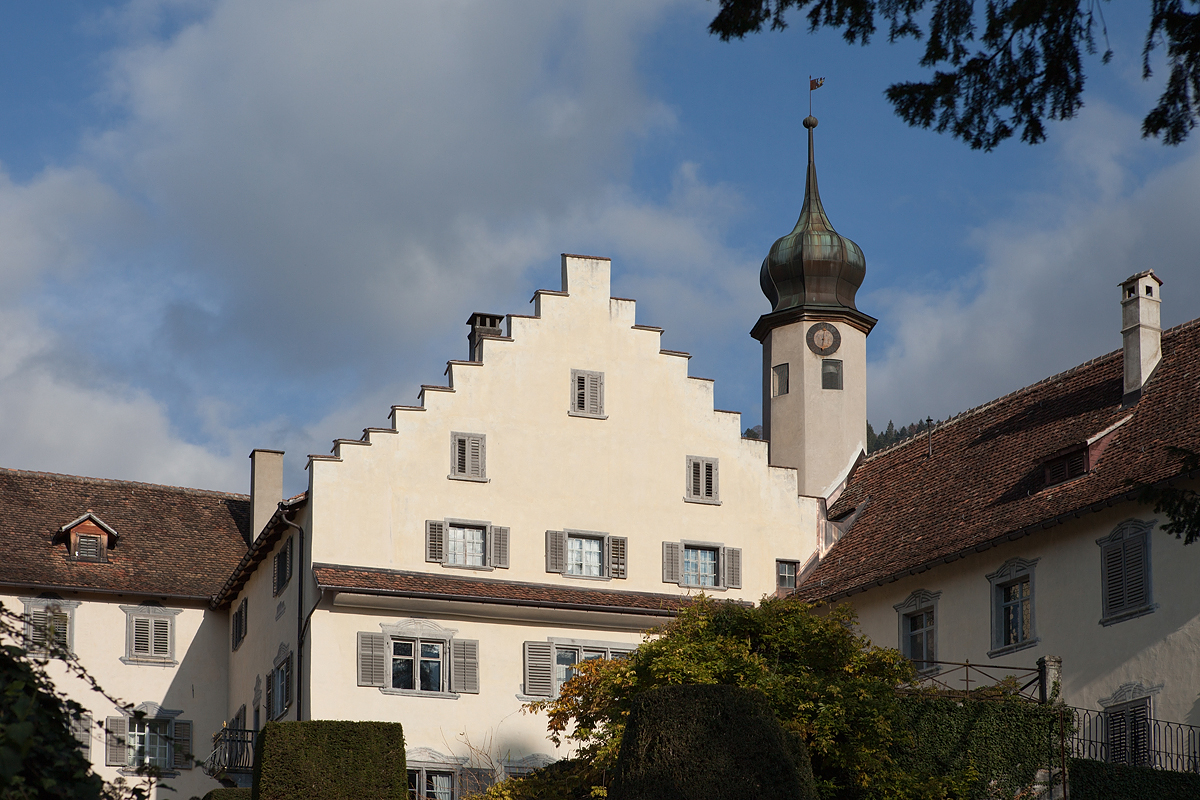
Bothmar Castle in Malans, 2011

Bothmar Castle is a castle in the municipality of Malans of the Canton of Graubünden in Switzerland. It is a Swiss heritage site of national significance.

== See also ==
- List of castles in Switzerland
