= Schiedberg Castle =

Castle in Sagogn, Switzerland

- castrum Sagogn
- Sagogn
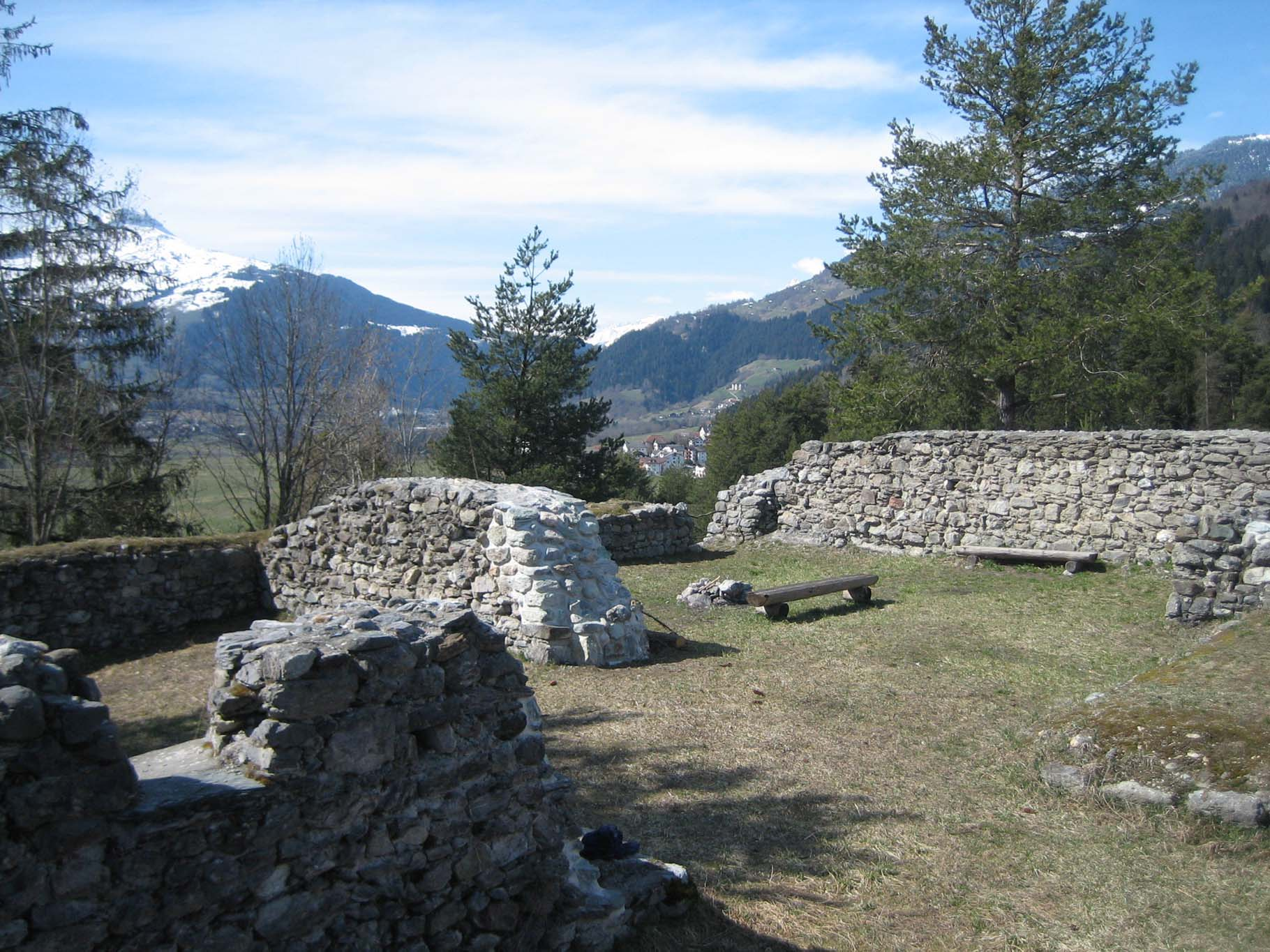
- Ruins of Schiedberg Castle

Site information
- Type: hill castle
- Code: CH-GR
- Condition: ruin

Location
- Coordinates: 46°47′30″N 09°16′0″E
- Height: 822 m above the sea

Site history
- Built: about 1000

Garrison information
- Occupants: Edelfrei

Schiedberg Castle is a castle in the municipality of Sagogn of the Canton of Graubünden in Switzerland. It is a Swiss heritage site of national significance.

== See also ==
- List of castles in Switzerland
