= Upper Castle, Zizers =

Upper Castle
- Oberes Schloss (German)
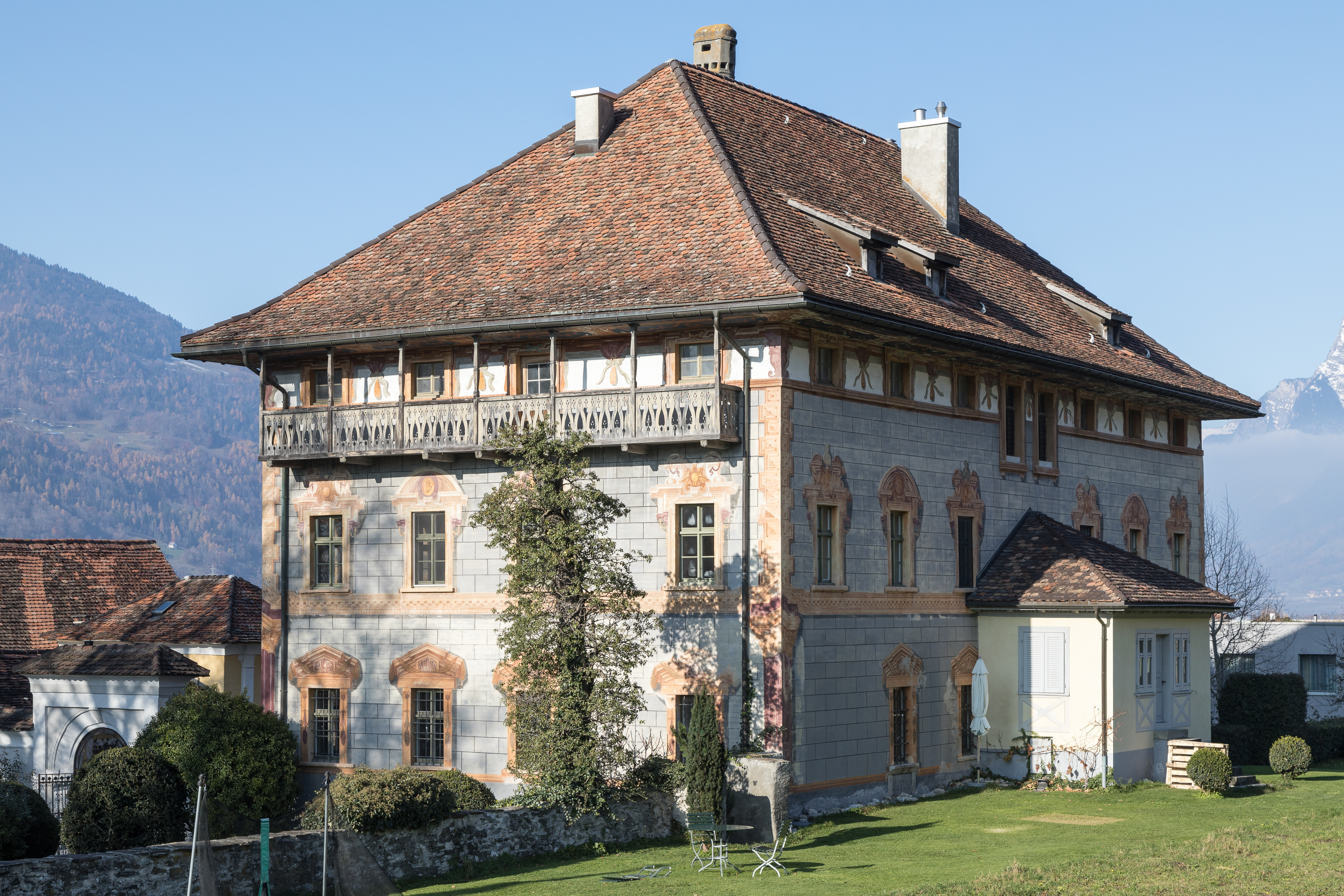

- Location within Canton of Graubünden Location within Switzerland
- 46°56′04″N 9°34′03″E
- Type: Castle
- Location: Oberschlossweg / Stöcklistrasse, Zizers

History
- Built: 1680
- Built for: Baron Simon von Salis

Site notes
- Restored: 1976-84; 2003-04

Swiss Cultural Property of National Significance

The Upper Castle in Zizers is a castle in the municipality of Zizers of the Canton of Graubünden in Switzerland. It is a Swiss heritage site of national significance.

== History ==
The Upper Castle in Zizers was built for Baron Simon von Salis (1646-1694) who was from the Tirano, Italy branch of the large and wealthy Salis family. Simon was the Captain over the Valtellina and had spent years in mercenary service in Sicily. When he built the castle in Zizers, the design was inspired by the architecture of Italian palaces. The castle was renovated in 1725 and again in 1790–1800. During the 18th century the castle was completely covered in facade paintings. Painting illusionary architectural elements was common in northern Italy during the 18th century and shows a continuing relationship with this branch of the Salis family and Italy.

The last members of the family, Franziska von Salis-Zizers and Therese von Salis-Zizers died in 1976 and 1977 respectively. After their deaths the castle library, with over 1000 volumes including many 17th through 19th century letters, business records, archives and chronicles were donated to the Cantonal Archives.

== Castle site ==
The castle is a square, massive building topped with a hipped roof. The 18th century facade paintings cover the entire building and include trompe-l'œil columns, illusionary windows, elaborate window frames and stone walls. Currently the castle is privately owned.

== See also ==
- List of castles in Switzerland
