= Parpan Castle =

Castle in Switzerland

Coordinates: 46°45′38″N 9°33′29″E

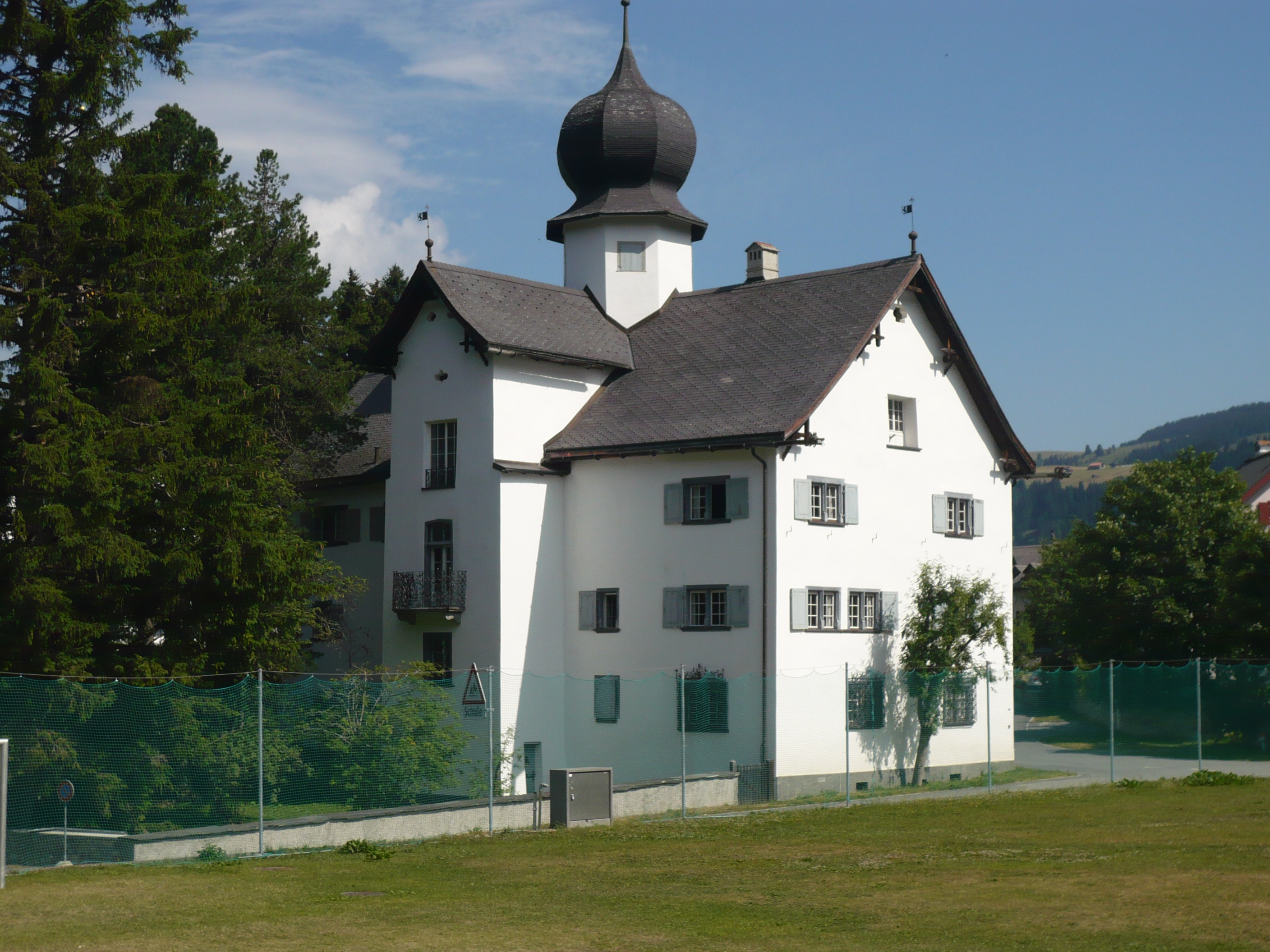
Parpan Castle

Parpan Castle is a castle in the municipality of Churwalden of the Canton of Graubünden in Switzerland. It is a Swiss heritage site of national significance.

== See also ==
- List of castles in Switzerland
