= Bishop's Castle, Fürstenau =

Historical castle in Switzerland

Coordinates: 46°43′16″N 9°26′42″E

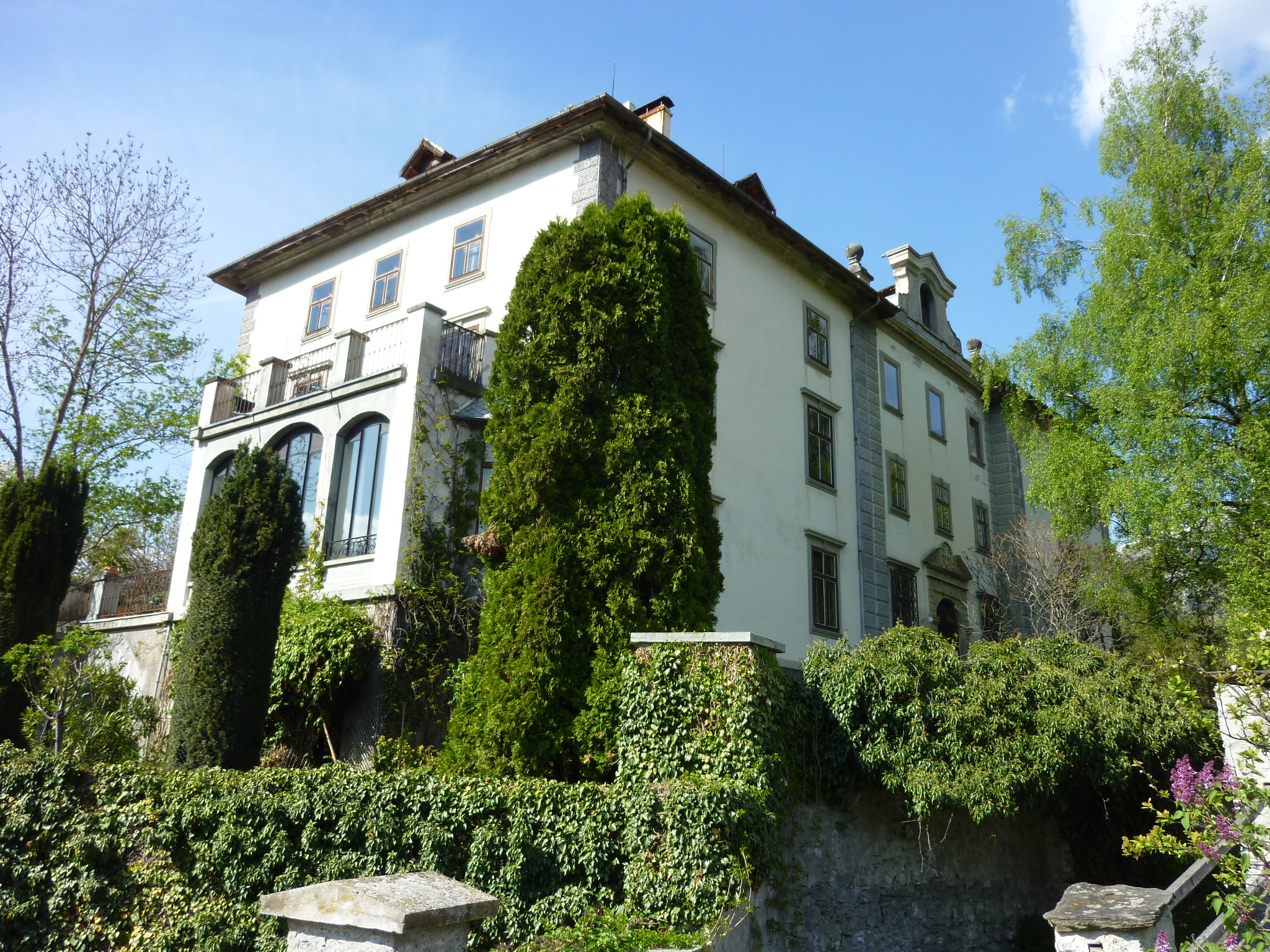
The Bishop's Castle

The Bishop's Castle (also: Unteres Schloss) is a castle in the municipality of Fürstenau of the Canton of Graubünden in Switzerland. It is a Swiss heritage site of national significance. The castle dates to the mid-to-late 13th century, while the current structure is from the early 18th century.

== See also ==
- List of castles in Switzerland
