= Lichtenstein Castle (Graubünden) =

Ruined castle in Switzerland

- Katzenburg
- Haldenstein
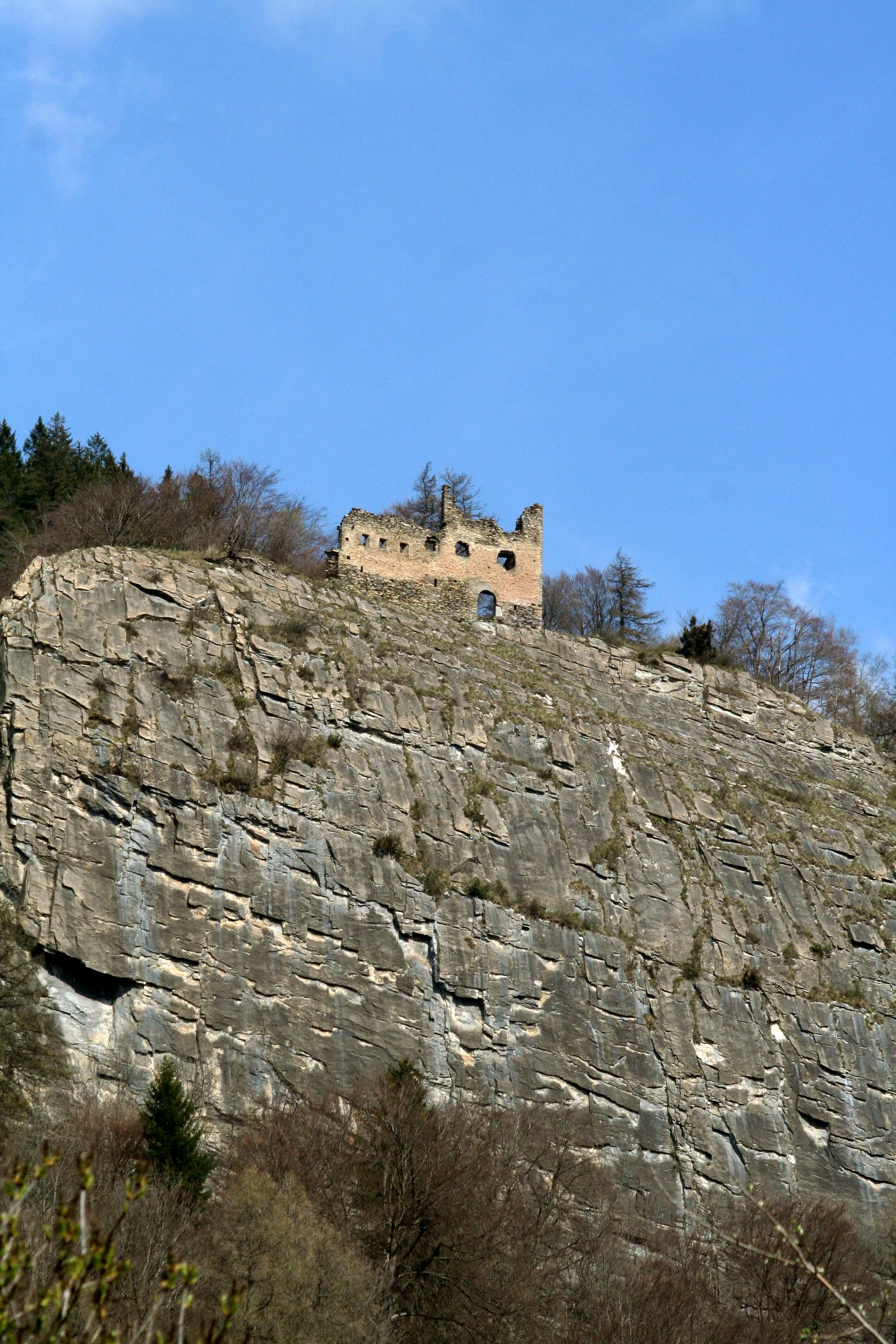
- Ruins of Lichtenstein Castle

Site information
- Type: hill castle
- Code: CH-GR
- Condition: ruin

Location
- Coordinates: 46°53′4.2″N 09°31′35″E
- Height: 770 m

Site history
- Built: early 12th century
- Materials: rubble stone

Garrison information
- Occupants: free nobility

Lichtenstein Castle is a ruined castle in the municipality of Haldenstein of the Canton of Graubünden in Switzerland.

== History ==
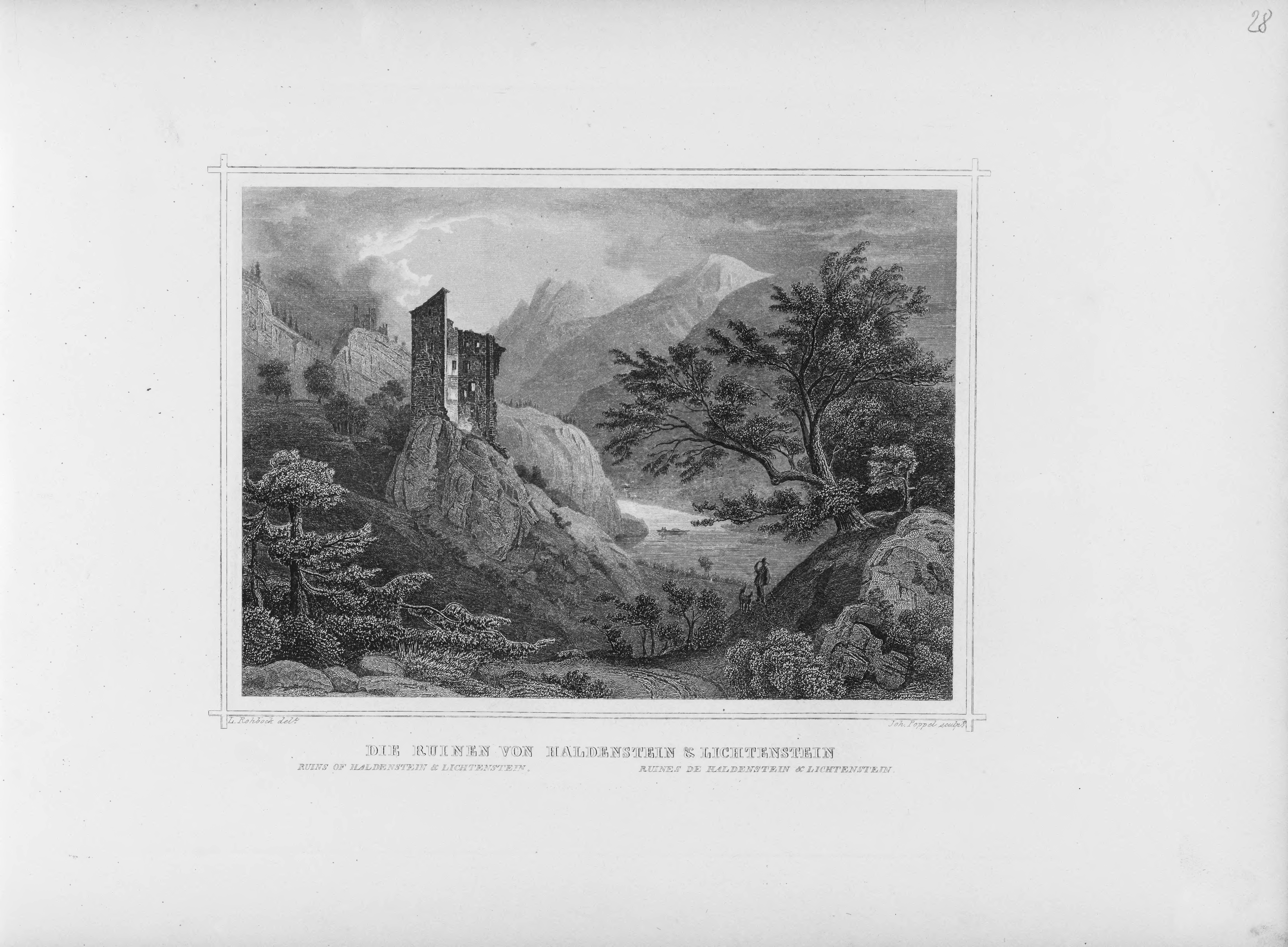
Lichtenstein Castle around 1870

The Lichtenstein family first appears in a document in Chur in 1180. The castle was probably already built at this time, though it first appears in a record in 1396. In the late 12th or early 13th century another branch, the Haldenstein family, built nearby Haldenstein Castle. Through the 13th century the Lichtenstein family was often mentioned in records. In 1271, the Bishop of Chur and the Abbot of Pfäfers Abbey stayed at Ulrich von Lichtenstein's home in Chur. On 22 March 1275 Ulrich died as the last male heir of the family. A relative, Canon Rudolph von Lichtenstein, outlived Ulrich but was last mentioned in 1282. The Lichtenstein lands were inherited by the Haldenstein family. The youngest of four Haldenstein brothers was named Lichtenstein von Haldenstein in the late 14th century. The male line of the Haldenstein family ended when Ulrich IV died at the Battle of Näfels in 1388. His lands were inherited by a number of relatives, but by 1424 the Herrschaft of Haldenstein was owned by Ursula von Hohenems and her husband Peter von Grifensee.

The castle was probably abandoned in the 15th century, though there was a Lichtenstein village that was mentioned in 1479. By the middle of the 16th century, the castle had fallen into ruin. During the Bündner Wirren, in May 1662, the castle was occupied by 200 men under the command of a Colonel Baldrion. However, after three days their provisions and drinking water were exhausted and they abandoned the castle ruins.

In the 20th century, the ruins were cleaned and repaired.

== Castle site ==
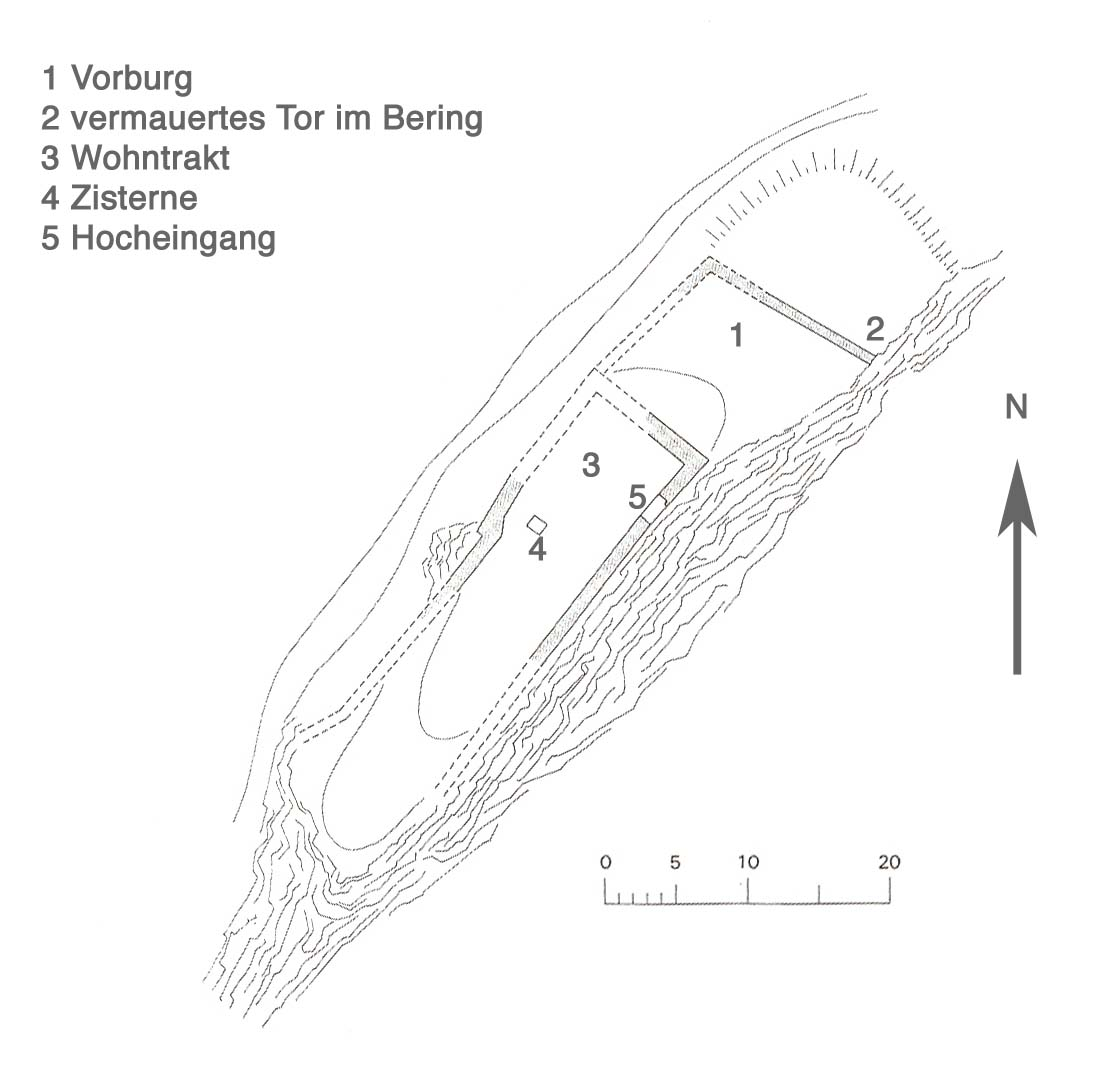
Castle site

The castle is built on the top of a narrow hill near Haldenstein with steep cliffs on two sides. North-east of the castle was a ditch that protected the outer wall. The outer wall encloses a rough square courtyard. The original gate in the outer wall was sealed up at some point and the location of the new gate is unknown. A three-story living quarters building was built on the highest point of the hilltop. It is an elongated rectangle with a door on the south-east side. As that door opens out onto a cliff, a wooden platform probably connected the door to the courtyard. A vertical joint in the walls of the residence indicates that it was expanded at least once. A large cistern in the living quarters held water for the castle.

== Gallery ==
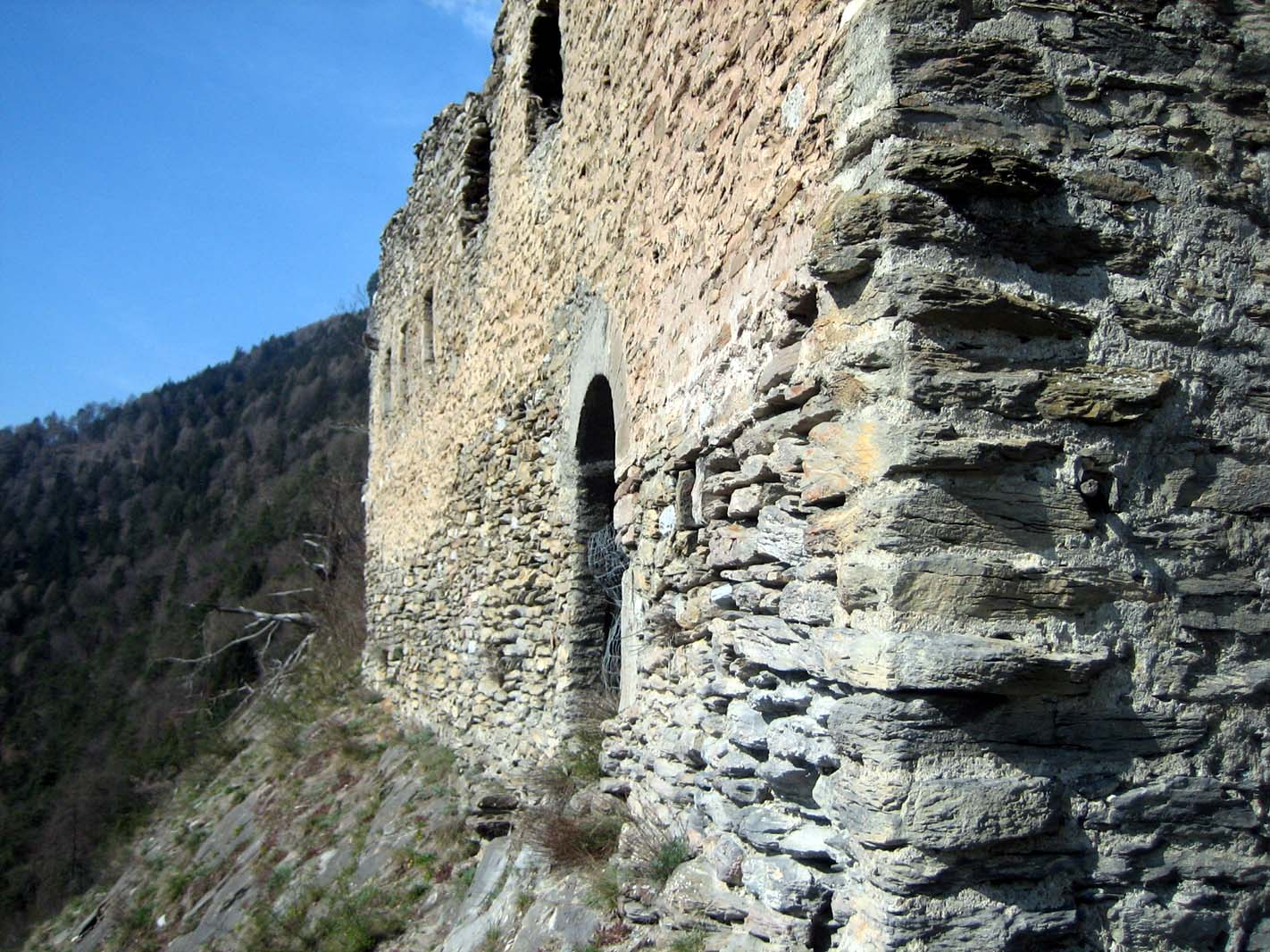
Exterior wall

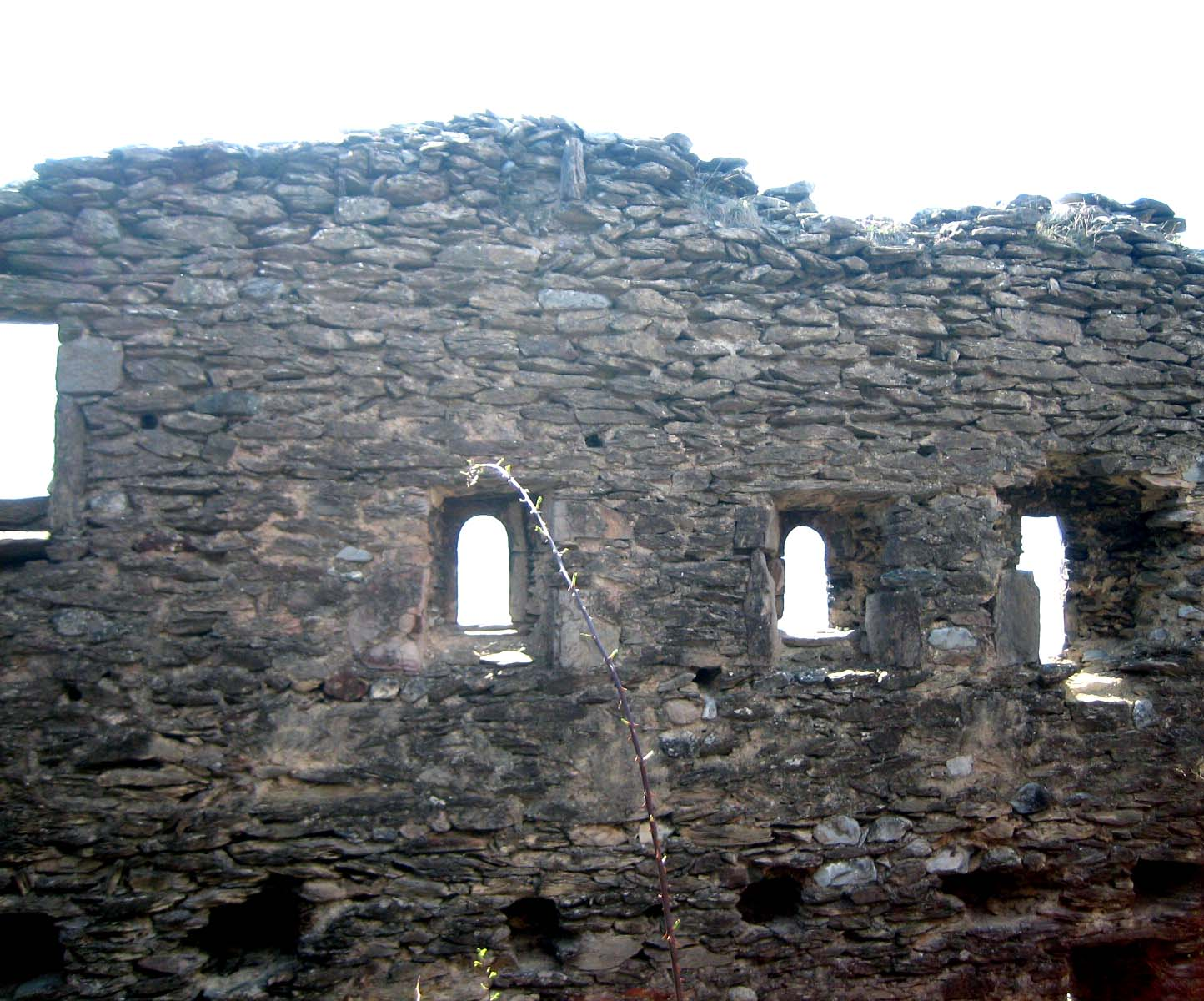
Interior of the castle

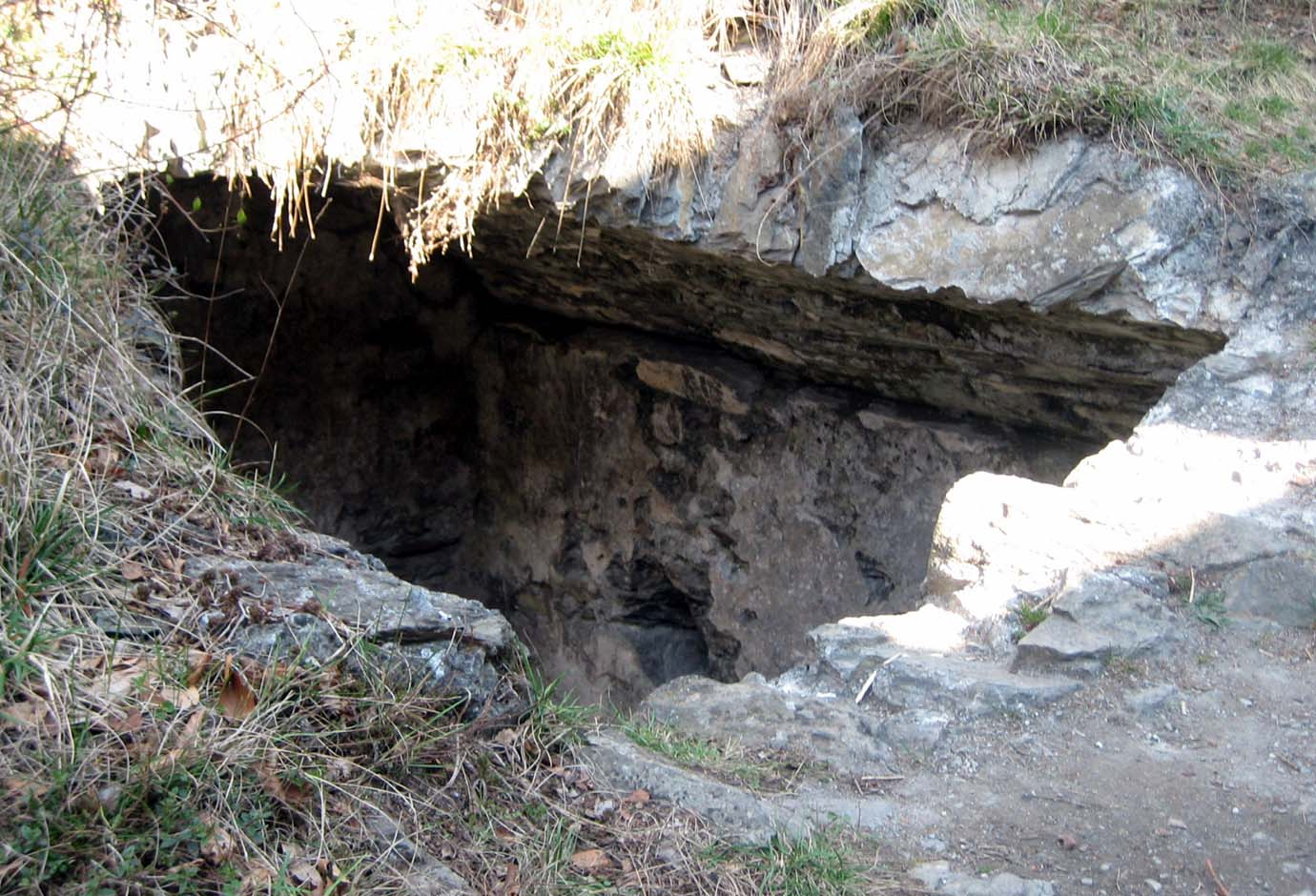
Castle cistern

== See also ==
- List of castles in Switzerland
