= Torre Fiorenzana =

Fortified tower of Grono (GR)

- Grono
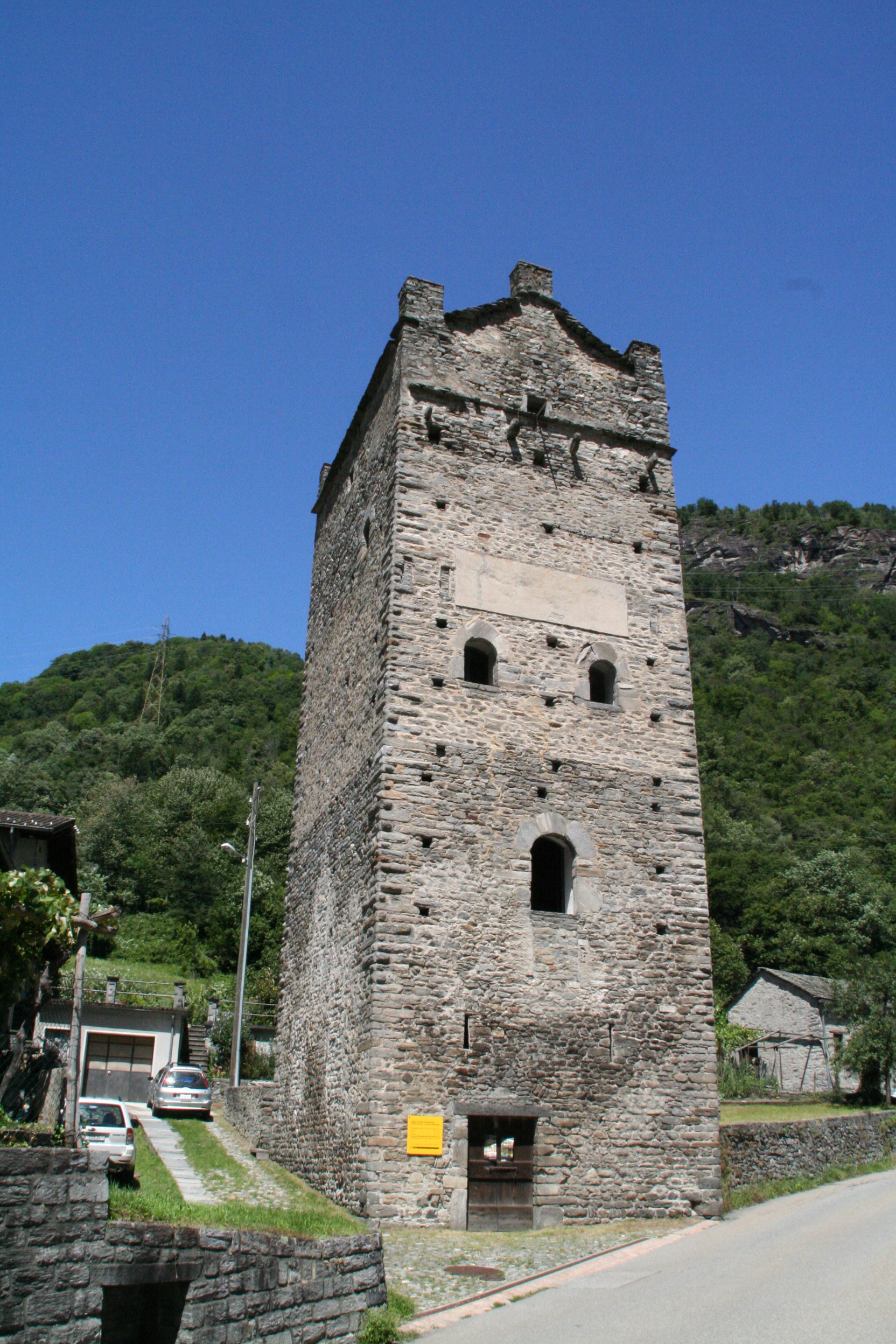
- Torre Fiorenzana

Site information
- Code: CH-GR
- Condition: privately owned

Location
- Coordinates: 46.25023°N 9.150185°E

Site history
- Built: late 12th century

Torre Fiorenzana is a castle in the municipality of Grono of the Canton of Graubünden in Switzerland. It is a Swiss heritage site of national significance.

== History ==
The tower house was built in the late 12th century for the local de Grono family. The first mention of the family is 1219. They appear again in local records in 1286 and 1288. The Canon Bernardinus of Grono and the Provost Heinrich appear to have been the last male members of the family. By 1314 it was owned by the powerful Lords of Sax-Misox and a branch of the family inhabited it. In the 14th century they were signing documents as de Saco de Grono and in the 15th century were de Saco de Fiorenzana. According to tradition, in 1406 the powerful leader of the family, Albert von Sax, was murdered at Fiorenzana.

In the 16th century the tower was locally owned. The coat of arms of the Three Leagues was painted on it at that time. Over the following centuries, it was inhabited by a number of local families and today remains privately owned. The exterior was studied and repaired in 1978.

== Castle site ==
The castle is located in the center of Grono village. It is a five-story, rectangular tower. The crow-stepped gables along the roof were added by the Lords of Sax-Misox in the 14th century. The original high entrance was located on the third floor and is still visible.

== See also ==
- List of castles in Switzerland
