= Haldenstein Castle =

Castle in Chur, Switzerland

Coordinates: 46°52′42″N 9°31′38″E

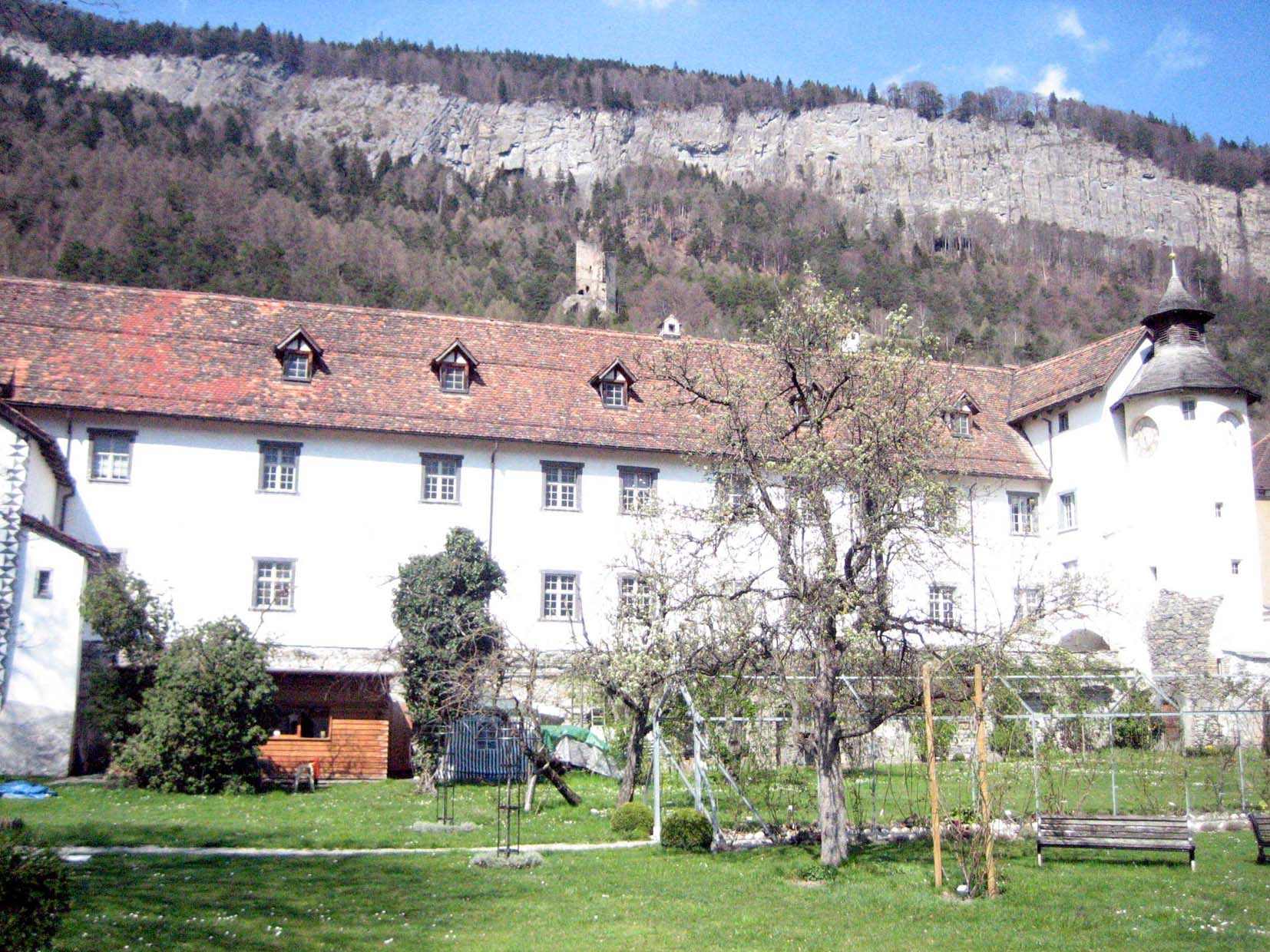
Haldenstein Castle

Haldenstein Castle is a castle in the former municipality of Haldenstein (now part of Chur) of the Canton of Graubünden in Switzerland. It is a Swiss heritage site of national significance.

== See also ==
- List of castles in Switzerland
