= Gugelberg von Moos family =

Noble family of the Grisons

The Gugelberg von Moos family, earlier von Moos genannt Gugelberg ("von Moos called Gugelberg"), was a noble family of officeholders and officers from Chur, Maienfeld and Malans in the Grisons. It rose into the ruling class of the Grisons in the early 16th century. In the 17th century the Chur branch mostly stood close to Spain, while the Maienfeld branch, owner of Salenegg Castle from 1654, mostly belonged to the French party. The family died out in the male line in the 20th century.

== History ==
Salenegg Castle, lithograph by Karl Heinrich Gernler after a photograph by Dietrich Jecklin, 1870

The von Moos, called Gugelberg, possibly came from Lachen. They spread to the Grisons in the 15th century, and from the beginning of the 17th century they called themselves Gugelberg von Moos. By holding municipal and episcopal offices, as holders of lordships and through marriage alliances, they rose into the ruling class of the Grisons in the early 16th century.

The knight Hans Luzi von Moos called Gugelberg (died 1515 at Marignano) led the troops of Chur in the conquest of the Italian subject lands in 1512, and in the same year he was mayor (Bürgermeister) of Chur. In 1522 Joachim and Johann von Moos called Gugelberg appear as holders of the lordship of Marschlins. Johann von Moos called Gugelberg (died 1556) is mentioned several times as town physician of Chur. Hans von Moos called Gugelberg (died 1554), also from Chur and a captain in French service, founded the Maienfeld line in 1533, and in 1551–1553 he was bailiff (Landvogt) of the lordship of Maienfeld. His son Luzius von Moos called Gugelberg (died 1579) was town bailiff (Stadtvogt) of Maienfeld and in 1559–1561 podestà in Morbegno. Luzius' brother Ambrosius von Moos called Gugelberg (born 1546), vicari (judge) in Sondrio in 1563–1565, after 1575 extended Bothmar Castle in Malans, which had been acquired from the Beeli family. Luzius' son Johann Luzi Gugelberg von Moos was podestà in Tirano. Between 1615 and 1785 members of the family held offices in the Valtellina five more times.

While the Gugelberg von Moos of Chur mostly stood close to Spain in the 17th century, the Maienfeld branch, which came into possession of Salenegg Castle in 1654, mostly belonged to the French party. Some members of this branch also served as officers in Dutch and English service. Members of the Grisons family appear several times in school and university registers: Hans Luzi (around 1578) and Johann Albert von Moos called Gugelberg (1590) in Zurich, Johann Anton (1609) and Ludwig Gugelberg von Moos (1636) in Basel, and Johann Anton (1610) and Karl Gugelberg von Moos (1679) at the law faculty in Padua. Hortensia Gugelberg von Moos and Maria Barbara Gugelberg von Moos were self-taught and became respected scholars. Ulysses Rudolf Gugelberg von Moos (1809–1875) was a sought-after engineer. The family died out in the male line in the 20th century.

== Bibliography ==
- Schweizerisches Geschlechterbuch, 1, 1905, 174–176; 5, 1933, 289–291
- P. E. Grimm, Die Anfänge der Bündner Aristokratie im 15. und 16. Jahrhundert, 1981, 224
- A. Collenberg, "Die Bündner Amtsleute in der Herrschaft Maienfeld 1509–1799 und in den Untertanenlanden Veltlin, Bormio und Chiavenna 1512–1797", in Jahrbuch der Historischen Gesellschaft von Graubünden, 129, 1999, 1–118
