= Johann Luzi Gugelberg von Moos =

Grisons politician (1562–1616)

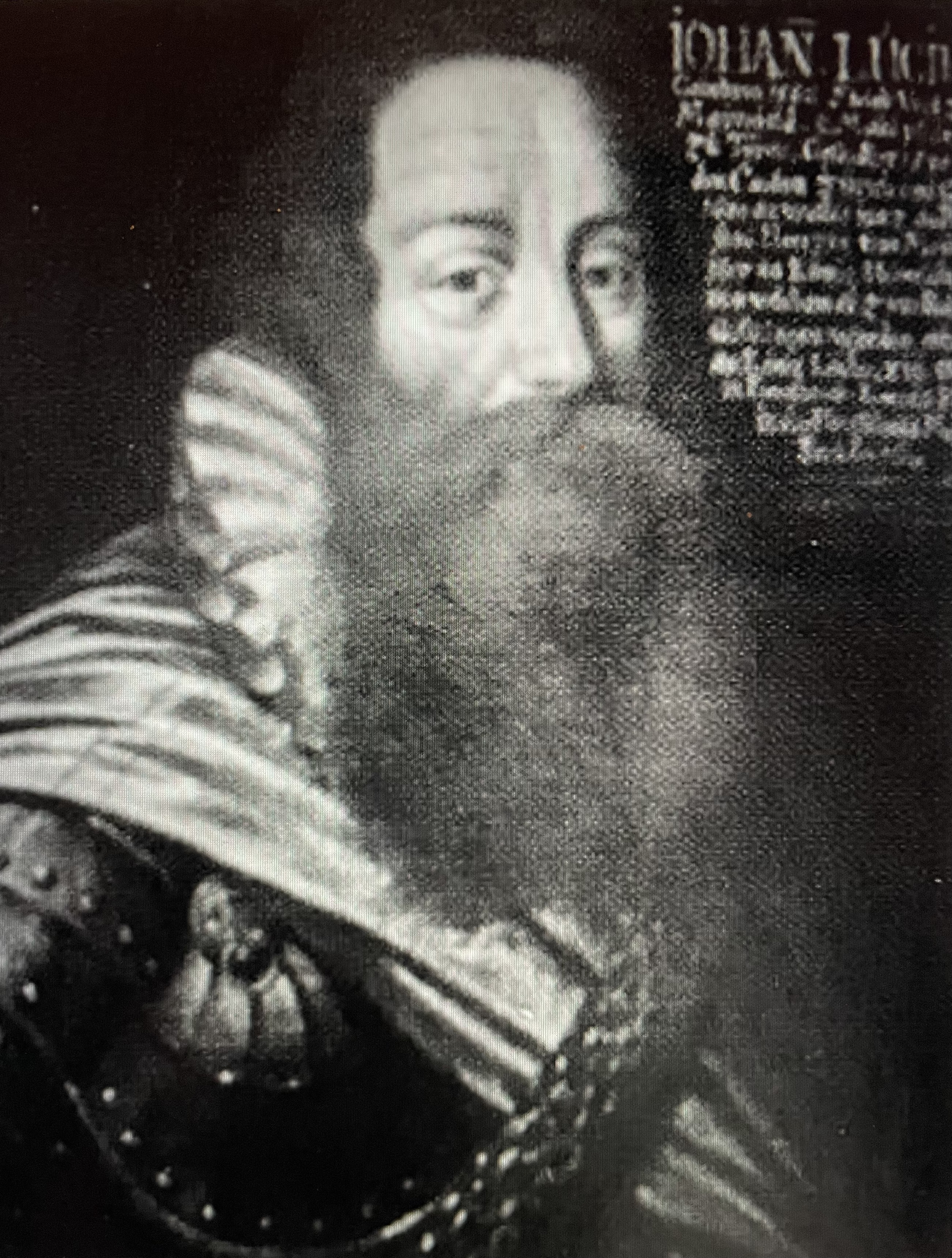
- Portrait
- Born: 1562
- Died: 1616 (aged 53–54)
- Burial place: Maienfeld, Three Leagues
- Other name: Ritter Rotbart
- Occupations: Politician; officer

Johann Luzi Gugelberg von Moos (1562 – buried 24 December 1616), also known as Ritter Rotbart (Knight Redbeard), was a politician and officer from the Three Leagues. He was town bailiff of Maienfeld and twice podestà of Tirano, served several times as an envoy of the Three Leagues, including to France, and was a captain in French service. In 1607 King Henry IV of France knighted him.

== Biography ==
Johann Luzi Gugelberg von Moos was a member of the Gugelberg von Moos family. He was the son of Luzius and Lukretia von Herrliberg.

From 1585 to 1587 and from 1597 to 1599 Gugelberg von Moos was podestà of Tirano in the Valtellina, and from 1589 to 1597 town bailiff (Stadtvogt) of Maienfeld. As an envoy of the Three Leagues he asked for support in Zurich, Glarus, Sion and Aarau in the struggle against Spain on the southern border of Raetia. In 1607, as a member of the Secret Council (Geheimer Rat), he was fined 20,000 crowns, but a counter-court (Gegengericht) in Ilanz acquitted him in the same year. Between 1607 and 1616 he was several times an envoy of the Three Leagues to France. He was a captain in French service, and in 1607 King Henry IV of France knighted him. He was buried in Maienfeld on 24 December 1616.

== Bibliography ==
- E. Clavadetscher, "Ritter Hans Luzi Gugelberg von Moos", in Bündnerisches Monatsblatt, 1940, 337–351
