= Brandis Castle =

Castle in Switzerland

Brandis Castle/Maienfeld Castle
- Maienfeld
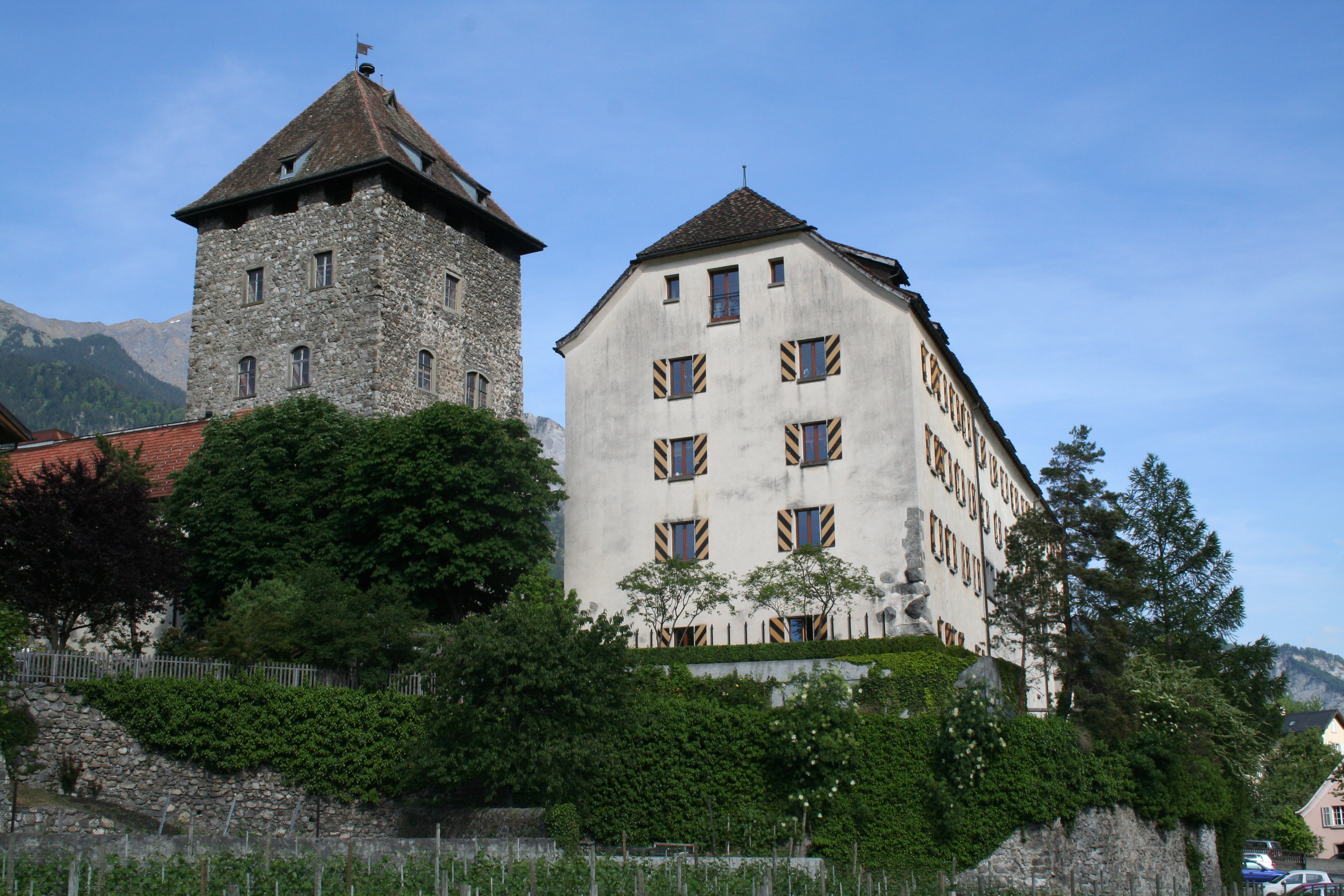
- Brandis Castle

Site information
- Type: Castle
- Code: CH-GR
- Condition: Restaurant

Location
- Coordinates: 47°00′23″N 9°31′51″E

Site history
- Built: 13th century

Garrison information
- Occupants: Freiherren von Aspermont

Brandis Castle or Maienfeld Castle is a castle in the municipality of Maienfeld of the Canton of Graubünden in Switzerland. It is a Swiss heritage site of national significance.

== History ==
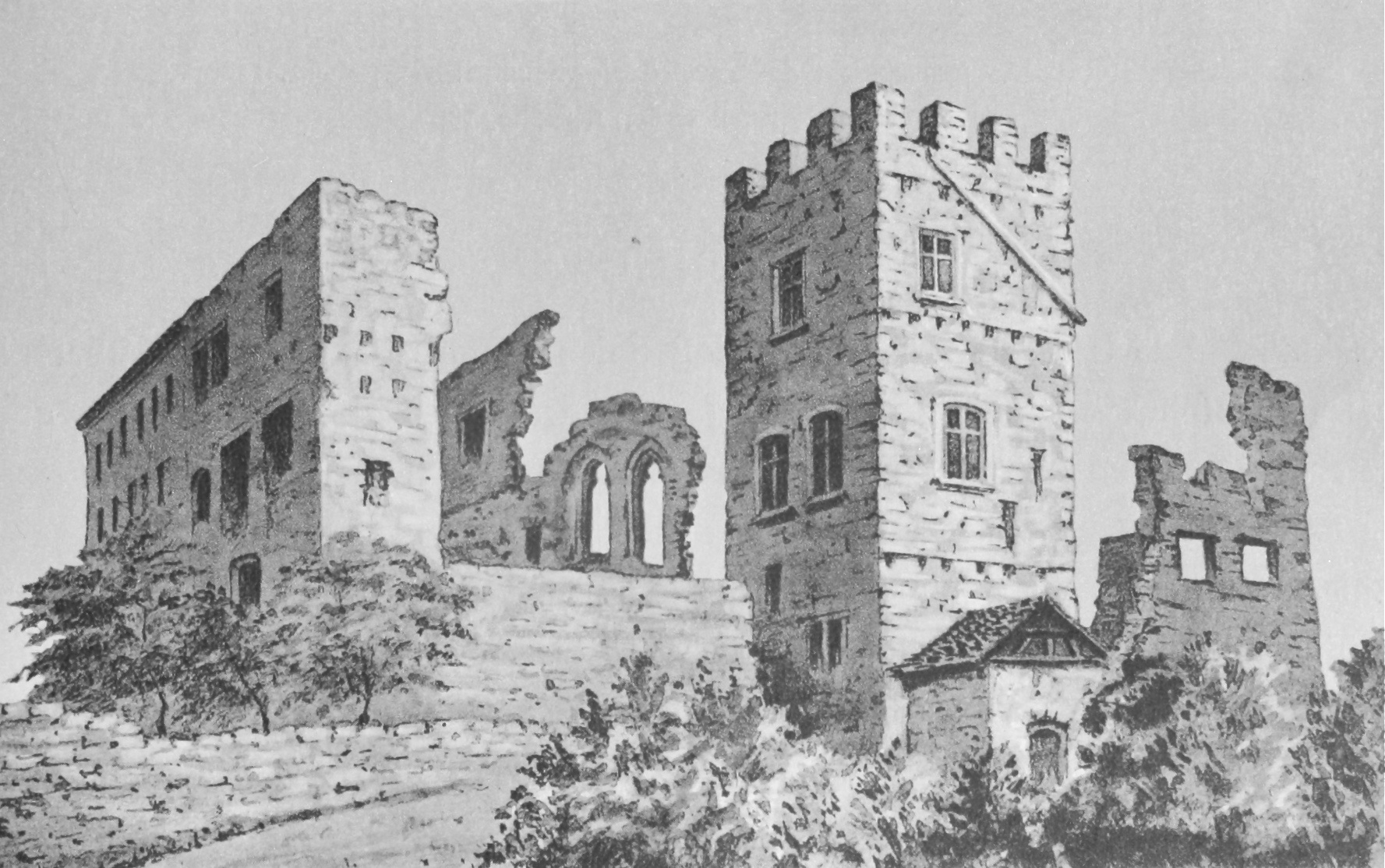
Brandis Castle in 1880

The Maienfeld area was an important Roman era customs station on the road between Turicum (Zurich) and Brigantium (Bregenz). After the Fall of the Western Roman Empire the area probably remained a local population center and retained some of the Roman buildings and fortifications. During the High Middle Ages the Carolingian royal estate of curtis Lupinis was built in the area and the town of Maienfeld grew up around the castle. In the 10th century the Lords of Bregenz probably built a small fortified tower near or on the site of the current castle.

The castle was built in the 13th century for the Freiherr von Aspermont and was originally known as Maienfeld Castle. In 1282 Heinrich von Aspermont specified in his will that upon his death his brother, Egilolf, was to inherit the castle and the Herrschaft of Maienfeld. With his death only two years later, Egilolf inherited the castle in 1284. In 1295 he hosted a peace conference between the Bishop of Chur and the Freiherr von Vaz at the castle. In 1338 the Freiherr von Aspermont sold most of his estates in Graubünden, but retained Maienfeld. However, in 1342 it was owned by the Lord von Windegg. In 1355 they sold the castle to the Counts of Toggenburg for 5600 gulden. Oddly, four years later they paid the same price to buy Maienfeld from the Counts of Werdenburg-Sargans.

After 1359 the Toggenburg Counts began expanding the fortified tower into a larger residence castle. They regularly resided and held court in the castle. The last of the line, Frederick VII added a residential wing, the so-called Neue Schloss (New Castle), across the courtyard from the old castle. After his death in 1436, his widow, Elisabeth von Matsch, lived at Maienfeld for several months until it was inherited by the von Brandis and von Aarburg families. In the same year, Maienfeld joined the League of the Ten Jurisdictions which was founded to resist the influence of the Austrian Habsburgs. During the Old Zürich War over the Toggenburg inheritance, Wolfhart V von Brandis initially fought on the Schwyz-Glarus side, but switched to the Zürich-Habsburg side from 1444 to 1446. After the war, he was able to buy the Aarburg portion of the inheritance and bring the castle firmly under the Brandis family. Over the following decade he sold all of his estates in the Canton of Bern. In 1475 he signed treaties with the League of God's House and the Bishop of Chur and in 1477 with the League of Ten Jurisdictions. Due to the Brandis family, the castle became known as Brandis Castle.

During the 1499 Swabian War the Count von Brandis found themselves on the Habsburg side. On 7 February 1499, they opened the gates of Maienfeld to an approaching Habsburg army. However, six days later a Graubünden army attacked and captured the town and castle. They plundered the town and brought Sigmund and Türing Brandis as prisoners to Chur. They were brought to their brother Johannes von Brandis, the provost of Chur Cathedral, who was forced to sell Maienfeld to pay for their freedom. After several years of unsuccessful negotiations, in 1509 Maienfeld and Brandis Castle were sold to the Three Leagues for 20,000 gulden.

Under the Three Leagues the castle became the home of the landvogt appointed by the Leagues over Maienfeld. In 1622 a fire devastated much of Maienfeld but left Brandis unharmed. However, two years later it was burned by Austrian troops. It was repaired and continued to house the landvogt until about 1700. In 1799 it was occupied by French troops following their invasion of Switzerland. During their occupation, they stripped and burned most of the wood in the castle and left it as a ruin. In 1807 the municipality of Maienfeld acquired the rights to the ruined castle and sold it to a private owner in 1837. Around 1860 the so-called Frauenturm, a late-medieval round bastion in the south corner of the castle, was demolished. The main tower was repaired and expanded in 1868. A new roof was added the castle in 1906. It was purchased in 1969 by the Zindel family and renovated. In 1972/73 the history of the castle was explored through an archeological exploration.

Today the castle is home to a restaurant and several rooms which are available for events or meetings.

== Castle site ==
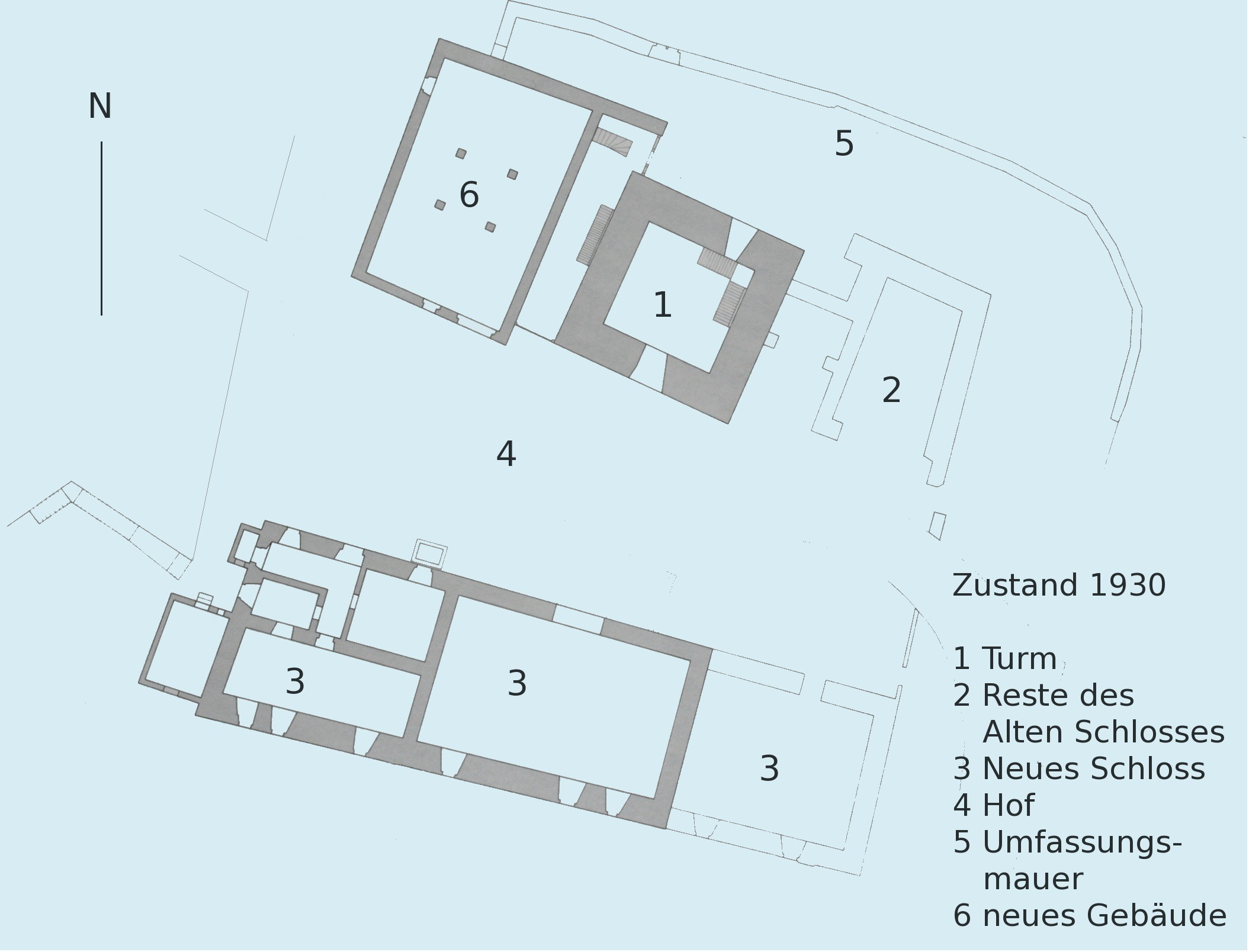
Brandis castle plan

The castle is located on the south side of the old town of Maienfeld. On the north side of the complex is the main tower, a six story, 12.5 by 12.5 meters (41 ft × 41 ft) square tower with walls that are 2.5 m (8.2 ft) thick. The original high entrance was located on south-west side on the third story. The fifth story is decorated with paintings from about 1320. The works at Brandis are the only known works by an artist known as the Waltensburg master which are in a secular building. The paintings include scenes from the life of Samson and Theoderic the Great, depictions of inns or taverns and coats of arms.

Surrounding the tower on the east and west are a residential wing and the remains of the old part of the castle. North of the tower is a semi-circular part of the old ring wall. South of the tower is a courtyard and the new castle which was built in the 15th century under the Toggenburg counts.

== Gallery ==
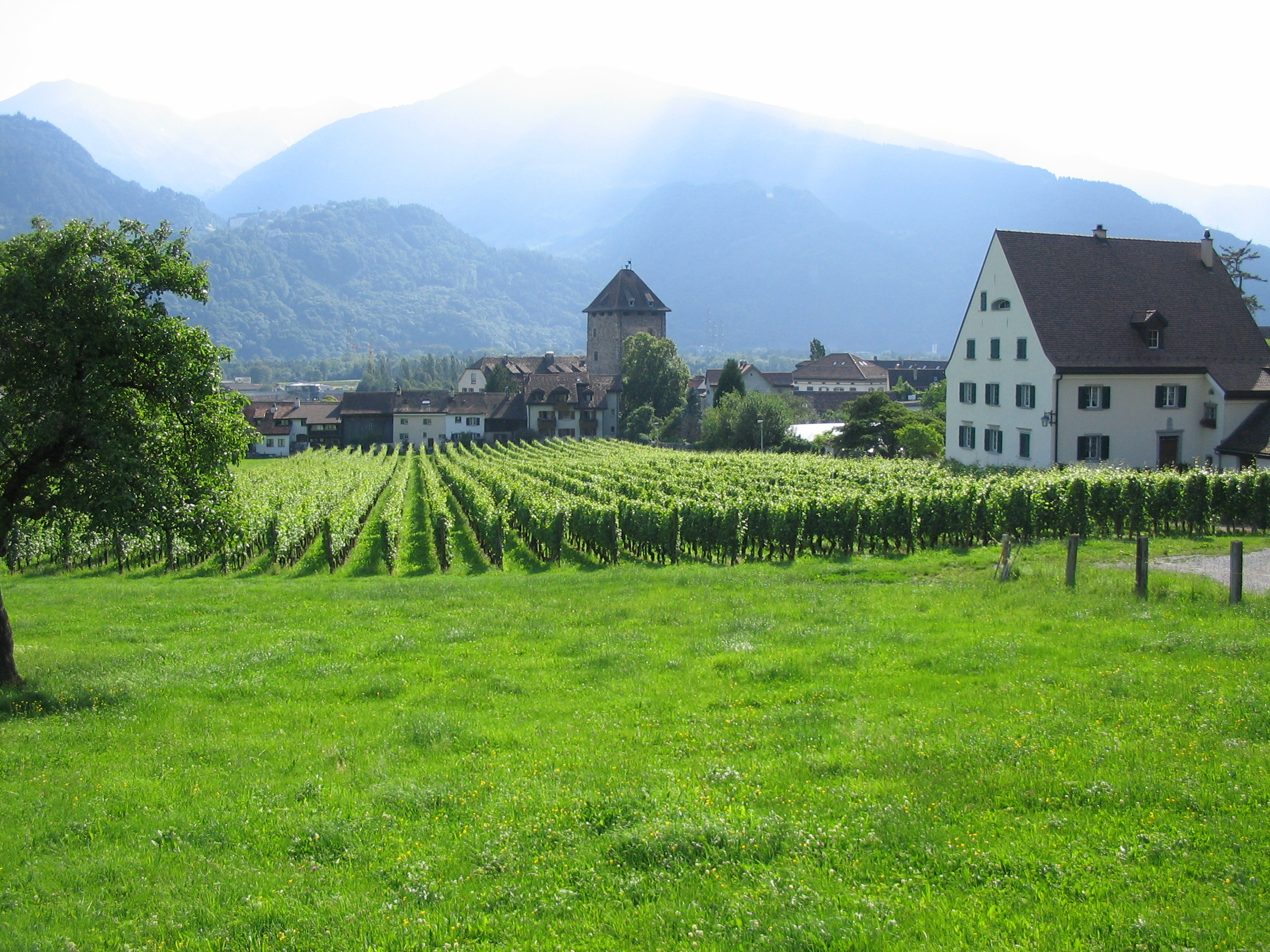
View of the castle and surroundings

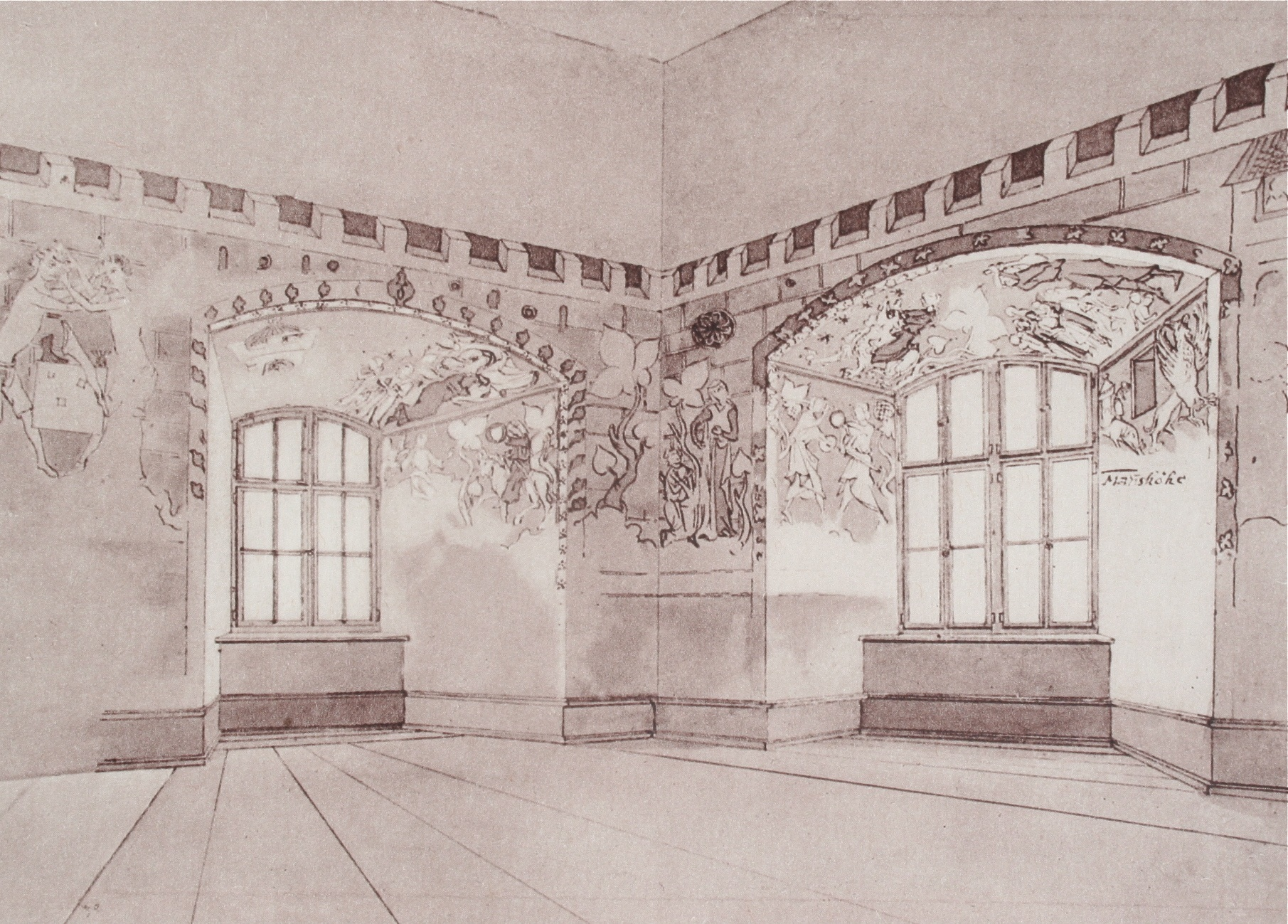
Drawing of the 14th century paintings in the tower 5th story

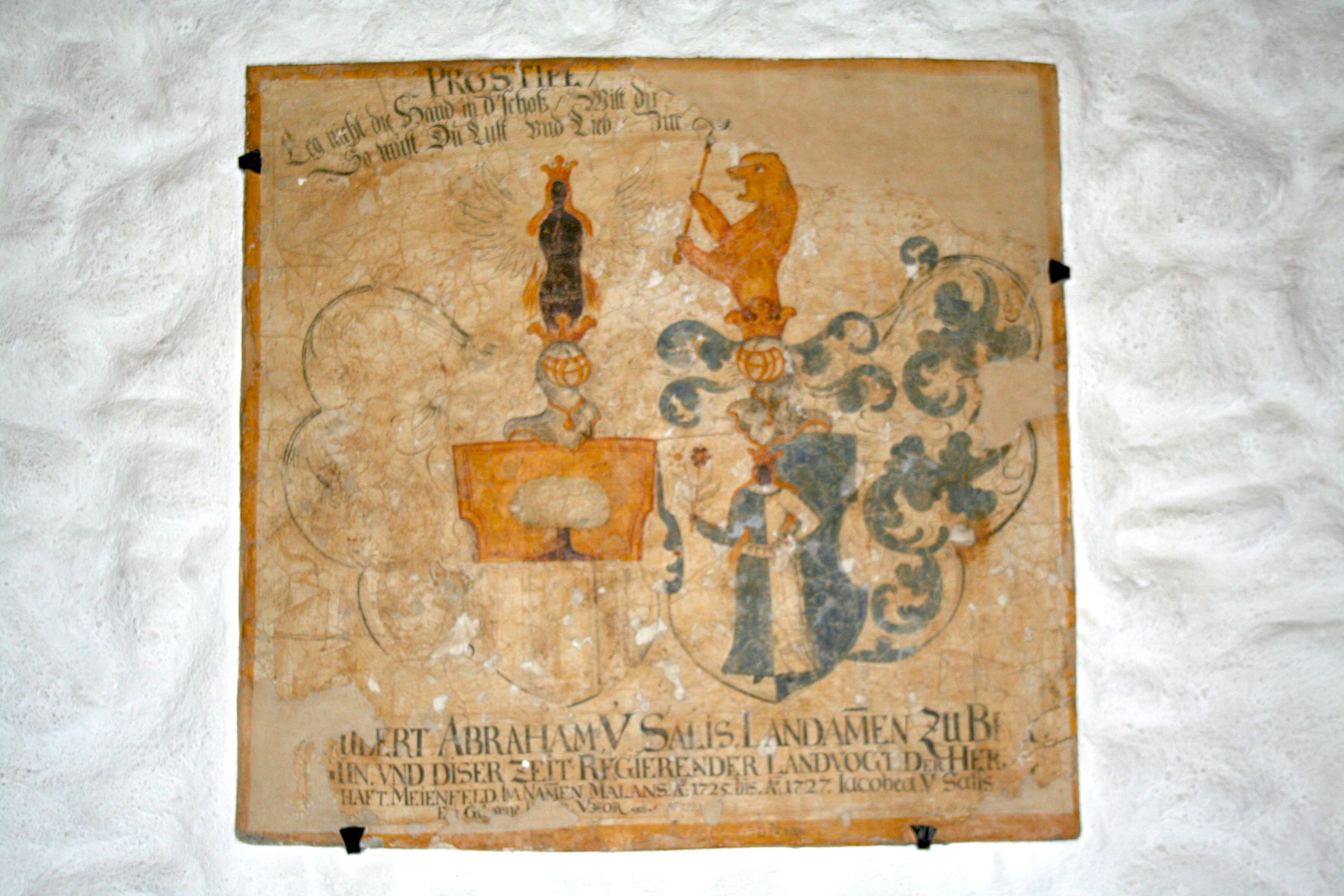
Coat of arms of the Salis family in Brandis Castle

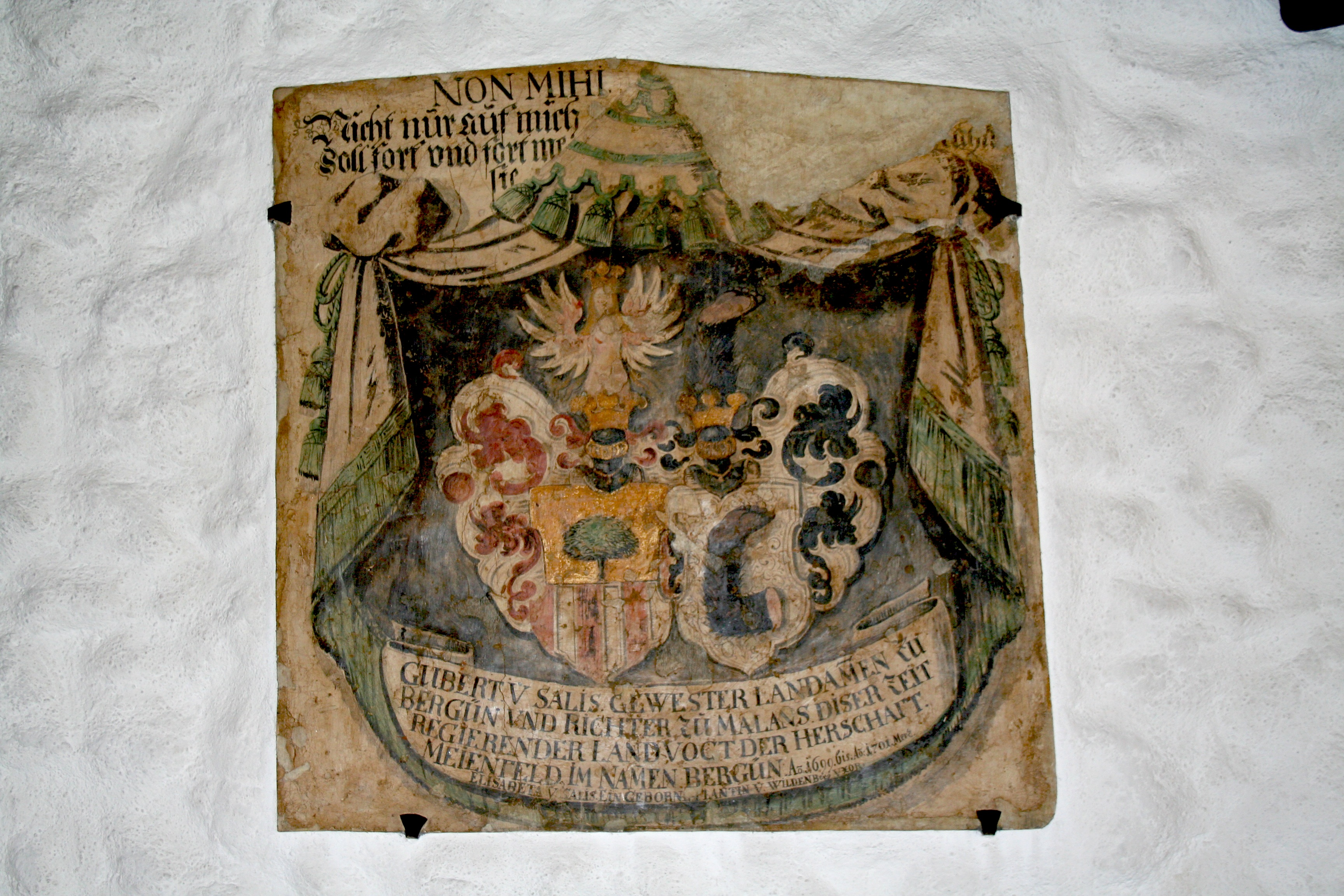
Coat of arms of the Salis family in Brandis Castle

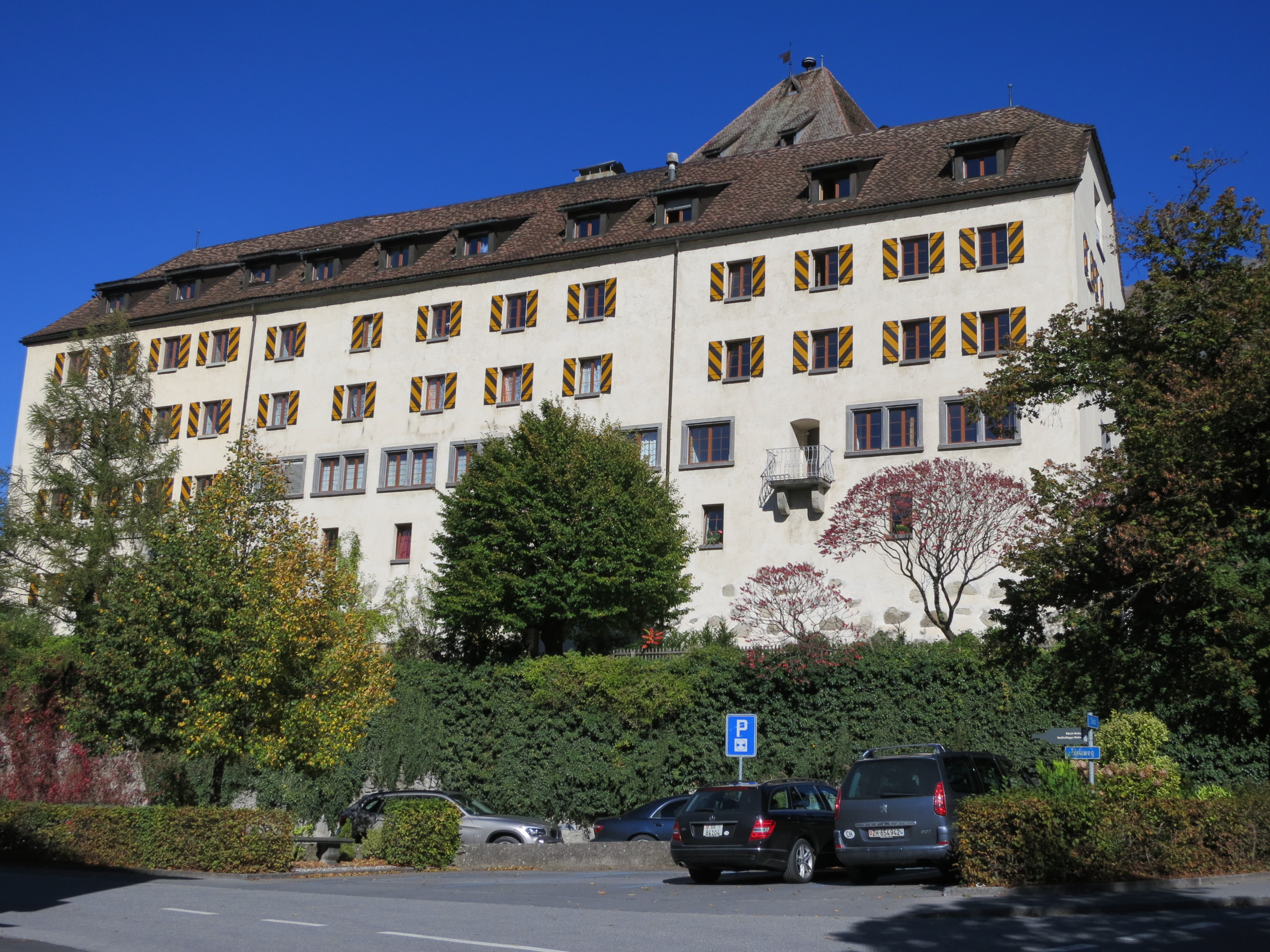
New Castle or residential building

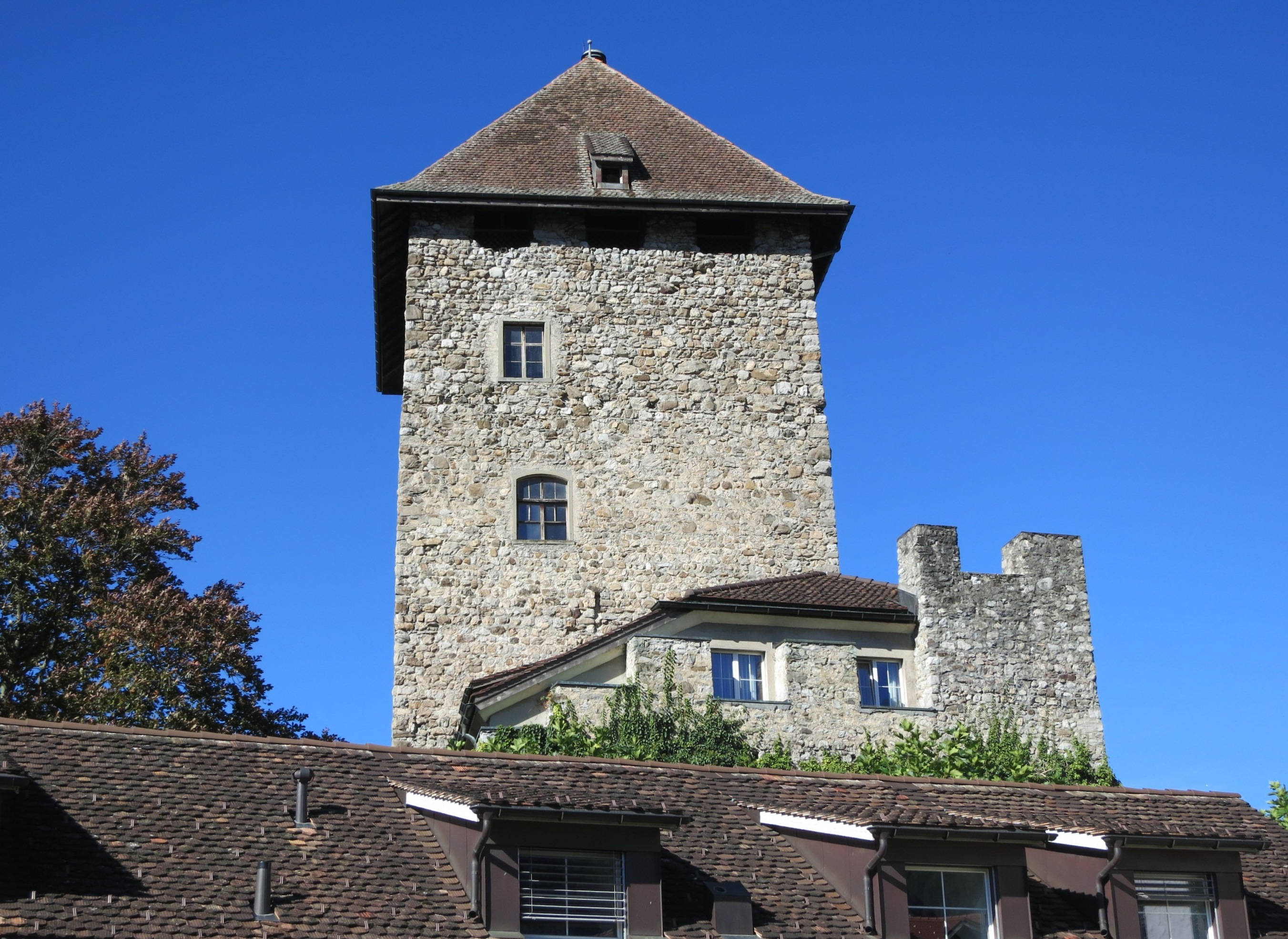
Tower of the old castle

== See also ==
- List of castles and fortresses in Switzerland
