= St. Luzisteig Pass =

Mountain pass in Switzerland and Liechtenstein

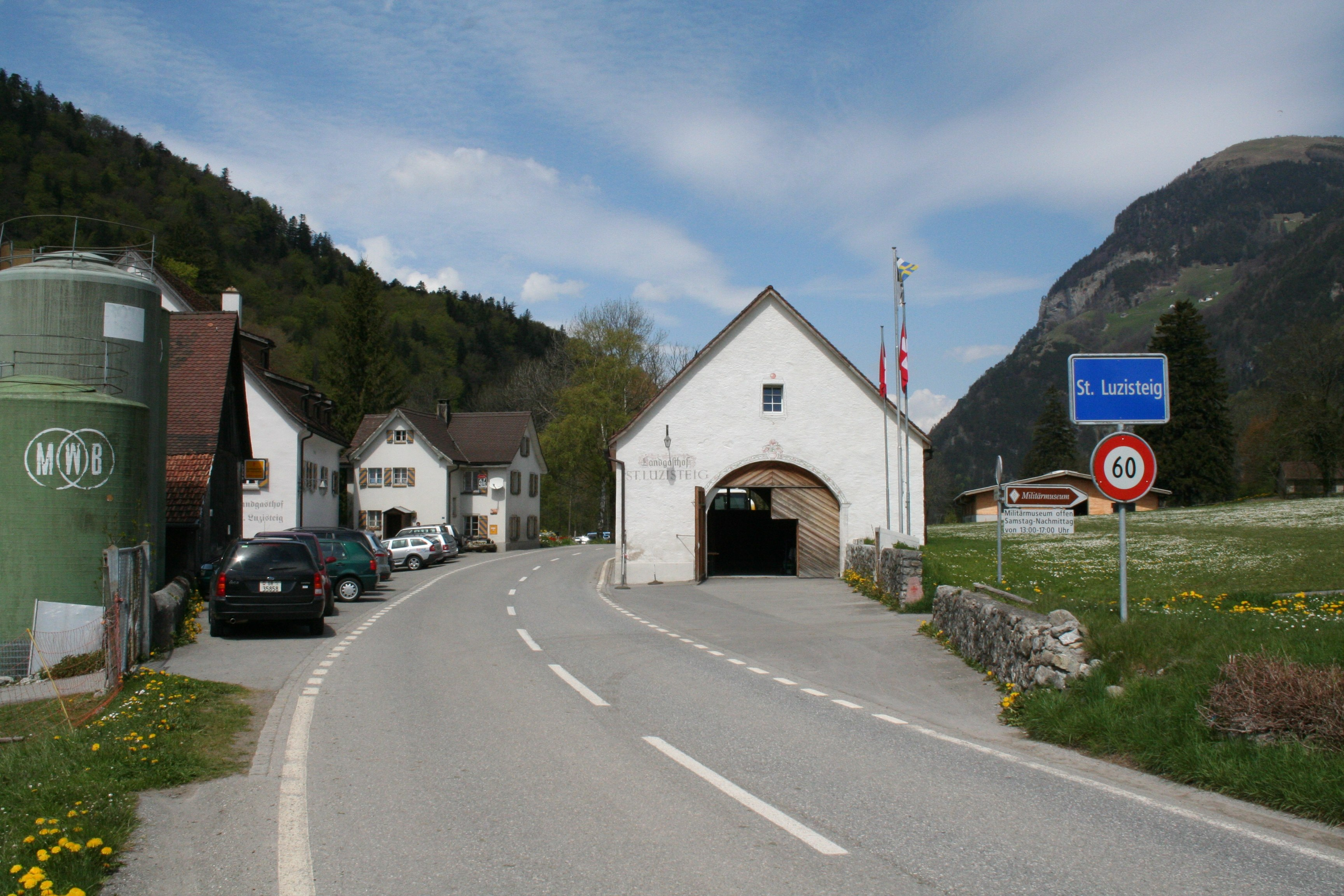
- Interactive map of St. Luzisteig Pass
- Elevation: 713 metres (2,339 ft)

Third Approach
- Location: Switzerland
- Range: Alps
- Coordinates: 47°2′17″N 9°31′38″E

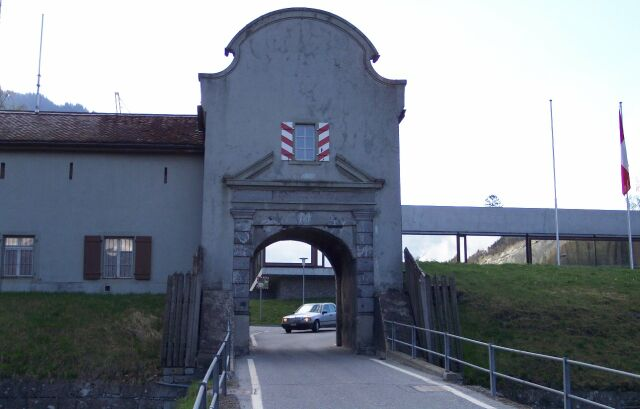
Entrance to the St. Luzisteig fortifications

St. Luzisteig Pass (Note: Also Sankt Luzisteig and Luziensteig. Historically known as Sankt Luzi ob dem Marswald, today locally known as Steig; Romansh: Pass da Son Gliezi) is a mountain pass in the Alps between the canton of Graubünden in Switzerland and Liechtenstein. The area contains the St. Luzisteig Fortress, a country inn, and a church (Steigkirche (St. Luzisteig)).

It connects Maienfeld in Graubünden and Balzers in Liechtenstein. The pass was economically and strategically important, as it was the only route between Graubünden and Vorarlberg (and thus also Southern Germany) until the opening of the Chur–Rorschach railway line in 1858. It played an important role during the Swabian War (1499), the Thirty Years' War (1618–1648), and the Coalition Wars (1792–1809). Near the pass are fortifications (St. Luzisteig Fortress) that were partially destroyed several times: in 1499, 1620–1622, and 1799 (by General André Masséna). They were rebuilt in 1622, but most of their current form was constructed between 1850 and 1860. The fortress has a caserne (barracks) and canteens. Since 1834, a Swiss Army training area has existed in the pass.

The pass road has a maximum grade of 12 percent.

== See also ==
- Media related to St. Luzisteig at Wikimedia Commons
- List of mountain passes
- List of highest paved roads in Europe
