= Heinz Nigg =

Swiss visual anthropologist

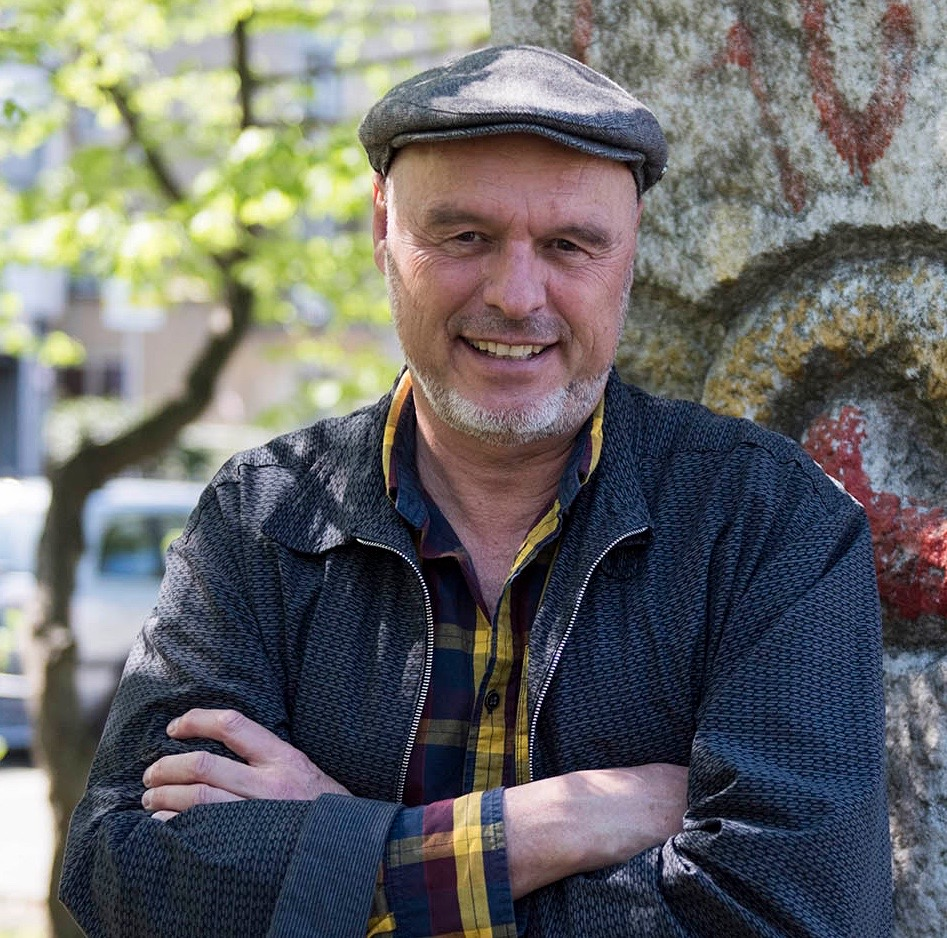
Heinz Nigg in front of a monument in Zurich commemorating the Youth Riots of 1980/81 and the Autonomous Youth Center (AJZ). Foto: Urs Juadas, 2015

Heinz Nigg (born 23 August 1949) is a Swiss anthropologist, community artist, and promoter of participatory video. In 1980 he documented the outbreak of the youth riots in Zurich. Heinz Nigg lives in Zurich and is the father of a son (*1981).

== Life ==
Nigg, a citizen of Maienfeld and Zurich, grew up with two siblings in Zurich, Switzerland. His parents came from a working-class and a farming family in Maienfeld, Canton of Grisons. His mother was a housewife and dressmaker, whilst his father worked for a non-profit housing association.

In 1967/68 Nigg spent one year as an exchange student in the US, where he was inspired by the artistic expression and politics of the 1960s Counterculture – including the Hippies and Yippies. From 1969 to 1976 he studied history, political science, and social anthropology at the University of Zurich. During this period he was also an activist in the youth movement and in the rebellious local art scene. He painted and took part in group shows. He also wrote exhibition reviews on Minimal and Conceptual art for the Tages-Anzeiger, and for the Kunstnachrichten, a journal of international art.

In 1974, he travelled to New York as assistant of Johannes Gachnang, director of the Kunsthalle Bern. There, he met the artist On Kawara and became a recipient of postcards from his I Got Up project. In 1975 Nigg collaborated with Izi Fiszman on the international art event Salto Arte in Brussels. There he was inspired by Joseph Beuys, who advocated for a liberated art practice outside of galleries and museums: Art by and for everyone.

From 1976 to 1979 Nigg lived in London where he did ethnographic fieldwork on the use of audiovisual tools in community cction and Community organizing, which was published as his dissertation in 1980 in Zurich. The book was widely distributed and discussed in the UK:

"What Nigg and Wade's research indicates is that video is a medium of rich potential, that is just waiting to be released. They make it clear that were professionals and amateurs have become dedicated to introducing some control over the usually authoritarian medium of TV, and where the monopoly of that resource can be broken down, spirited initiatives are possible. Community Media implies that low-gauge video is far from being just a toy invented to enable the nuclear family better use of programmed TV schedules."

From 1979 to 1980 Nigg was a lecturer at the Ethnologisches Seminar of Zurich University. Because of a controversial video documentation about the Zurich youth movement and the Opera-House Riots he was banned from teaching at the university. This case of censorship led to a wave of international solidarity with Dr. Nigg and Prof. Lorenz G. Loeffler, head of the department.

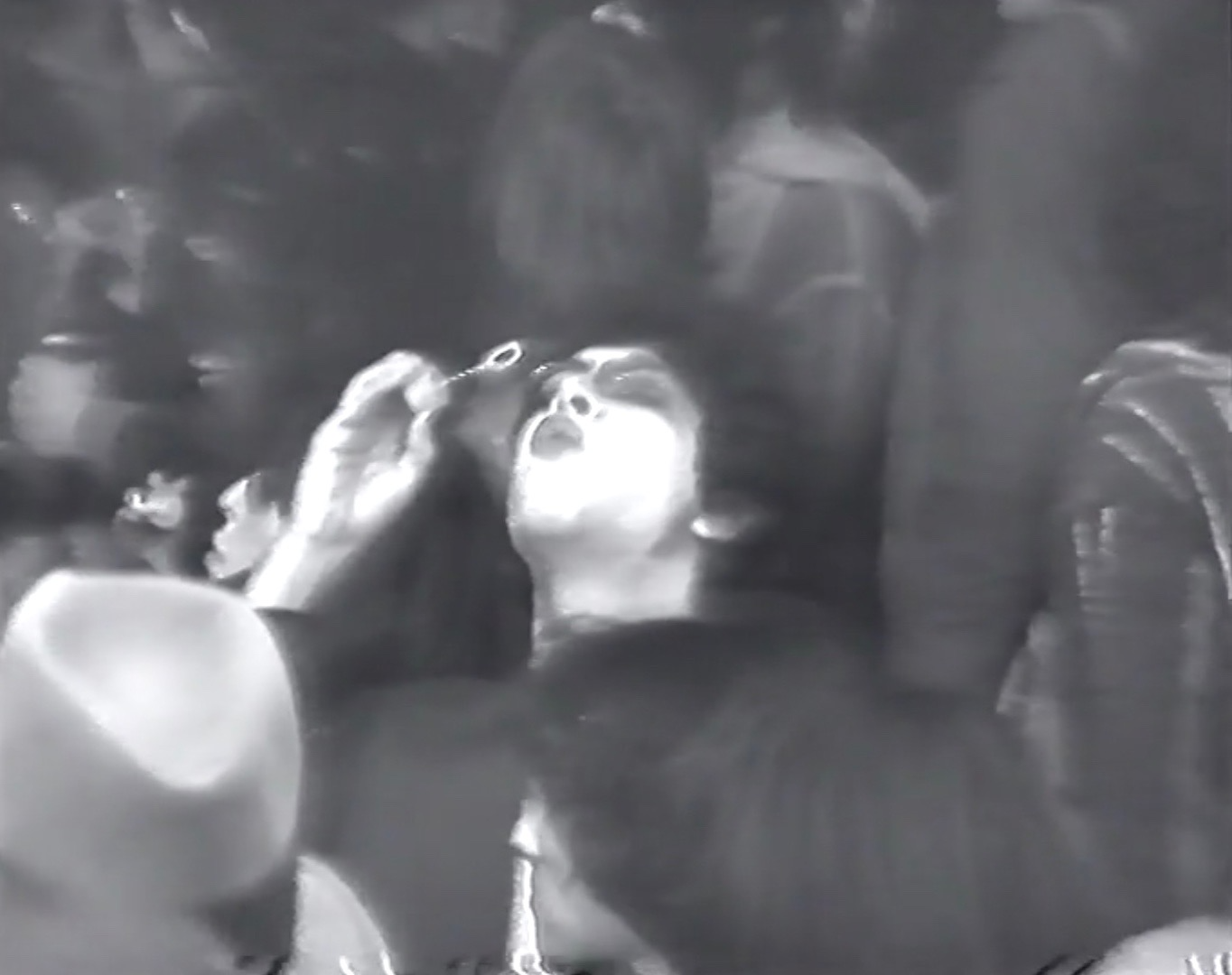
Video Opera-House Riots, Zurich 1980. Project group Community Media

== Professional work ==
Nigg has been active as a visual anthropologist and community artist since 1980. His research and projects address social movements, participation in urban development and the documentation of migration and mobility. In 2017, he curated Rebel Video for the Swiss National Museum, an exhibition about the alternative video movements in Switzerland and the UK during the 1970s and 1980s. He primarily works with portraits based oral history methods and he is also involved in conceptual art and photography projects.

== DIY ==
For Nigg, do-it-yourself video continues to play a crucial role in art, politics and social movements. Now an integral feature of mobile communication, video invites participation and is an expression of the digital revolution. In his book Rebel Video and on its website, Nigg argues that the production and distribution of audiovisual messages can be democratised, especially through social media. In the political sphere, DIY video has become an essential tool for activism and investigative journalism. In the arts, DIY video opens up new forms of creative expression for the realisation of experimental works that, according to Nigg, often cross the boundaries between amateur art and professional artistic creation.

== Archiving video ==
In collaboration with Memoriav, the Swiss Social Archives, the Media Archive of the Zurich University of the Arts (ZHdK) and Goldsmiths, University of London, Heinz Nigg has digitised and archived several video collections from the 1970s to the 2010s.

Nigg sees videos from this period as important historical sources providing insights into social movements and cultural dynamics. They show how video was used to make social change visible, including in contexts of protest. For ethnographic urban research, video archives offer authentic representations of different communities inscribing themselves in urban spaces. Nigg also believes in their potential for media education, community work and art practices with a social purpose. Overall, he sees video archives as sites of memory. They contribute to the reflection on new media in society.

== Publications ==
=== In English ===
- New York: Up Close. Ein Bildband. BoD, Norderstedt 2024, ISBN 978-3-7583-7033-5
- London: Up Close. Ein Bildband. BoD, Norderstedt 2024, ISBN 978-3-7597-0745-1
- Miavista: A visual diary. BoD, Norderstedt 2024, ISBN 978-3-7583-6305-4
- Miavista: A visual diary, Volume 2. BoD, Norderstedt 2024, ISBN 978-3-7597-2951-4
- Rebel Video. The Video Movement of the 1970s and 1980s. London, Basel, Bern, Lausanne, and Zurich.Zurich 2017, Verlag Scheidegger & Spiess, ISBN 978-3-85881-801-0
- Sans-papiers on their March for Freedom 2014: how refugees and undocumented migrants challenge Fortress Europe. In: Interface. A journal for and about social movements. Vol 7 (1): i–iv (May 2015) Movement practise(s), pp. 263–288.
- Youth Protest Media in Switzerland. In: John D.H. Downing (Ed.) Encyclopedia of Social Movement Media. Thousand Oaks, California 2011, SAGE Publications, pp. 555–558, ISBN 978-0-7619-2688-7
- Violence and Symbolic Resistance in the Youth Unrest of the Eighties. In: Sønke Gau, Katharina Schlieben. Spectacle, Pleasure Principle or the Carnivalesque? A Reader on Possibilities, Experiences of Difference and Strategies of the Carnivalesque in Cultural/Political Practice. Berlin 2008, b_books, pp. 151–166, ISBN 978-3-933557-78-0
- Together with Graham Wade. Community Media. Community Communication in the UK: Video, local TV, film, and photography. A documentary report on six groups. Zurich/London 1980: Regenbogen Verlag, ISBN 3-85862-010-6

=== In German ===
- Möwen über dem Wasser – Kurzgeschichten. BoD, Norderstedt 2025, ISBN 978-3-8192-7636-1
- Mittendrin. Ein Tagebuch. AV-Produktionen Heinz Nigg in Zusammenarbeit mit BoD, Norderstedt 2023, ISBN 978-3-7578-2000-8
- entrechtet – beraubt – erinnert. Dokumentation über Opfer des Nationalsozialismus mit Bezug zu Zürich. Zürich 2021, edition 8, ISBN 978-3-85990-431-6 With Video (20 mins.) on www.remembered.ch (also with english subtitles)
- Video: Ich sehe! Eine Autobiografie, AV-Produktionen Heinz Nigg in Zusammenarbeit mit BoD, Norderstedt 2021, ISBN 978-3-7534-0450-9
- Rebel Video. Die Videobewegung der 1970er- und 1980er-Jahre. London, Basel, Bern, Lausanne und Zürich. Zürich 2017, Verlag Scheidegger & Spiess, ISBN 978-3-85881-556-9
- Die Achtziger – Porträt einer Bewegung. In: Peter Bichsel, Silvan Lerch. Autonomie auf A4. Wie die Zürcher Jugendbewegung Zeichen setzte. Flugblätter 1979–82. Zürich 2017, Limmat Verlag, S. 233–240, ISBN 978-3-85791-833-9
- Augenöffner: Raubkunst und Fluchtgut erinnern an den Holocaust. In: Thomas Buomberger, Guido Magnaguagno (Hrsg.) Schwarzbuch Bührle. Raubkunst für das Kunsthaus Zürich? Zürich 2015, Rotpunktverlag, pp. 217–231, ISBN 978-3-85869-664-9
- Die Revolution findet auch im Saal statt. In: Urs Kälin, Stefan Keller, Rebekka Wyler (Hrsg.) Hundert Jahre Volkshaus Zürich. Bewegung. Ort. Geschichte. Zürich 2010, hier + jetzt, S. 72–81, ISBN 978-3-03919-149-9
- Die alternative Videobewegung – ein transnationales Phänomen. In: Urs Berger, Ruedi Bind, Julia Zutavern, Adam Szymczxk (Hrsg.): Filmfront(al). Der experimentelle und politische Film der 1970er- und 1980er-Jahre in Basel. Basel 2010, Friedrich Reinhardt Verlag, S. 27–32, ISBN 978-3-7245-1657-6
- Global Town Baden. 30 Porträts aus einer urbanen Region. Zürich 2010, Limmat Verlag, ISBN 978-3-85791-617-5
- Gewalt und symbolischer Widerstand in den Jugendunruhen der Achtzigerjahre. In: Sønke Gau, Katharina Schlieben. Spektakel, Lustprinzip oder das Karnavaleske? Ein Reader über Möglichkeiten, Differenzerfahrungen und Strategien des Karnavalesken in kultureller/politischer Praxis. Berlin 2008, b_books, S. 141–150, ISBN 978-3-933557-78-0
- Wir sind wenige, aber wir sind alle. Biografien aus der 68er-Generation in der Schweiz. Zürich 2008, Limmat Verlag, ISBN 978-3-85791-546-8
- Die Xenixen. Vier Porträts aus einem multikulturellen Kino in Zürich. In: Veronika Grob, René Moser, Beat Schneider (Hrsg.) XENIX - Kino als Programm. Zürich 2006, Schüren Verlag, S. 68–93, ISBN 3-89472-403-X
- Express yourself. Video als widerständische Praxis in der Jugendbewegung der 1980er-Jahre. In: Andreas Broekmann, Rudolf Frieling (Hrsg.) Bandbreite. Medien zwischen Kunst und Politik. Berlin 2004, Kulturverlag Kadmos, S. 69–74, ISBN 3-931659-65-8
- Mappamondo. Textcollage einer kleinen Welterkundung. In: Matthias Michel (Hrsg.): Wissenschaft und Welterzählung: Die narrative Ordnung der Dinge. Edition Collegium Helveticum, Band 1. Zürich 2003, Chronos Verlag, S. 231-33, ISBN 978-3-0340-0643-9
- Wir wollen alles, und zwar subito. Die Achtziger Jugendunruhen in der Schweiz und ihre Folgen. Mit Videokompilation auf DVD und Website. Zürich 2001, Limmat Verlag (vergriffen), ISBN 3-85791-375-4
- Da und fort. Leben in zwei Welten. Immigration und Binnenwanderung in der Schweiz. Zürich 1999, Limmat Verlag, ISBN 3-85791-331-2
- Zusammen mit Martin Heller und Claude Lichtenstein. Letten it be. Eine Stadt und ihr Problem. Zürich 1995, Schriftenreihe 19 des Museums für Gestaltung, ISBN 3-907065-58-1
- Zusammen mit Margrit Bürer. VIDEO: Praktische Videoarbeit mit Kindern und Jugendlichen. Zürich 1990: Pro Juventute Verlag, vergriffen, ISBN 3-7152-0186-X
- Zusammen mit Elsbeth Kuchen. "Jungi mached Fernseh!" Videoarbeit mit Kindern und Jugendlichen, Zürich, Sommer 1980. In: CINEMA. Unabhängige schweizerische Filmzeitschrift, 26. Jahrgang, Nummer 3/80, S. 23–31
