= Maria Gugelberg von Moos =

Swiss artist (1836–1918)

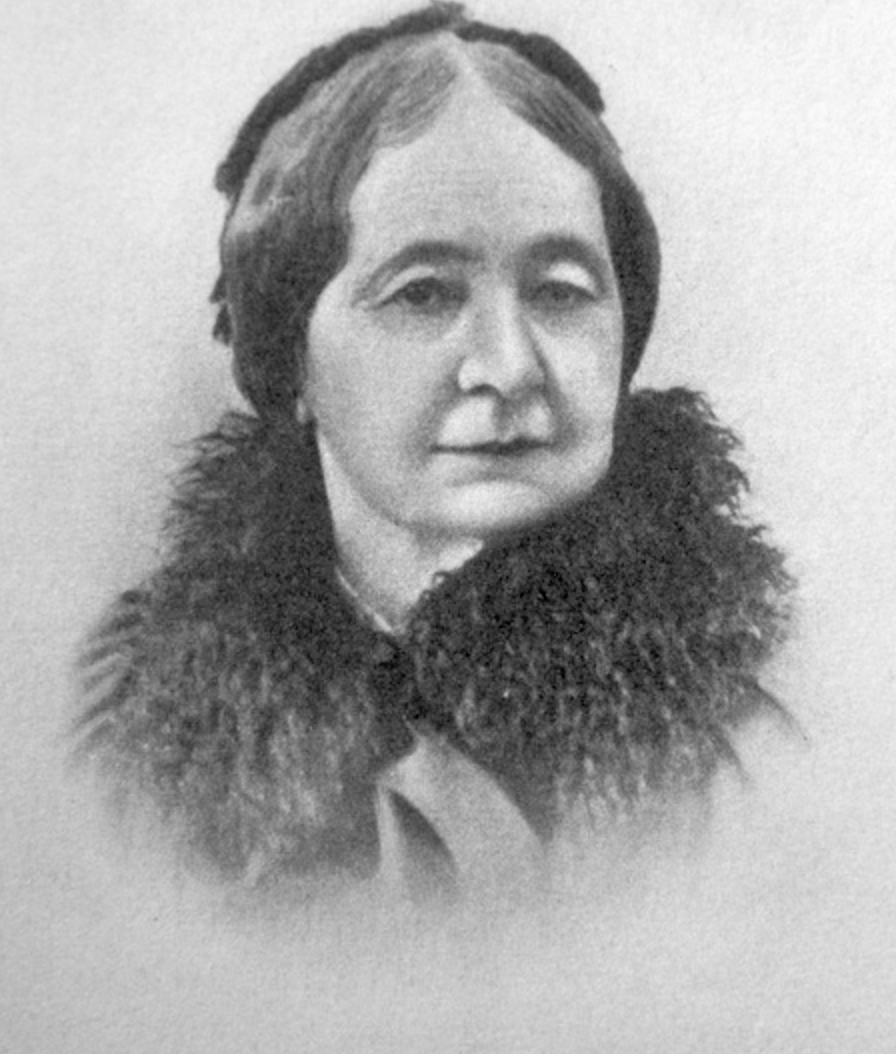
- Born: 6 February 1836; Maienfeld, Graubünden
- Died: 29 October 1918 (aged 82); Salenegg Castle
- Occupation: botanist
- Parents: Ulysses Gugelberg von Moos (father); Elisabeth Jecklin von Hohenrealta (mother)

Maria Gugelberg von Moos (1836–1918) was a Swiss botanist and floral artist. Growing up amidst the natural beauty surrounding Salenegg Castle, she developed an early interest in natural history, and later botany. She studied botany extensively in middle age, systematically collecting and studying plants.

== Biography ==
Maria was born 6 February 1836 in Maienfeld, Graubünden. She was the oldest daughter and one of eight children born to Ulysses Gugelberg von Moos and Elisabeth Jecklin von Hohenrealta from Domleschg. Her father was a civil engineer who had been involved in the construction of roads, waterworks and the first railway line to connect Shur with Sargans.

=== Early years ===
Maria attended the local school and then spent about two years at a Neuchâtel school run by the deeply religious Moravian brotherhood. As a child, she took an interest in plants and the nature surrounding her home, Salenegg Castle.

=== Research ===
In her middle years, she became a serious botanical observer. Her most important work was her study of mosses and liverworts; she discovered 47 new species in the Graubünden region and other cantons of Switzerland. She also worked with botanist Christian Georg Brügger, painting detailed illustrations of his hybrids. Some of her reproductions, including the Primrose, Sempervivum and Saxifraga, were regarded as important at the time.

In 1902, Gugelberg von Moos was named the first woman to become a corresponding member of the Naturforschende Gesellschaft Graubündens (Graubünden Natural Research Society), for her contributions to botany.

=== Later years ===
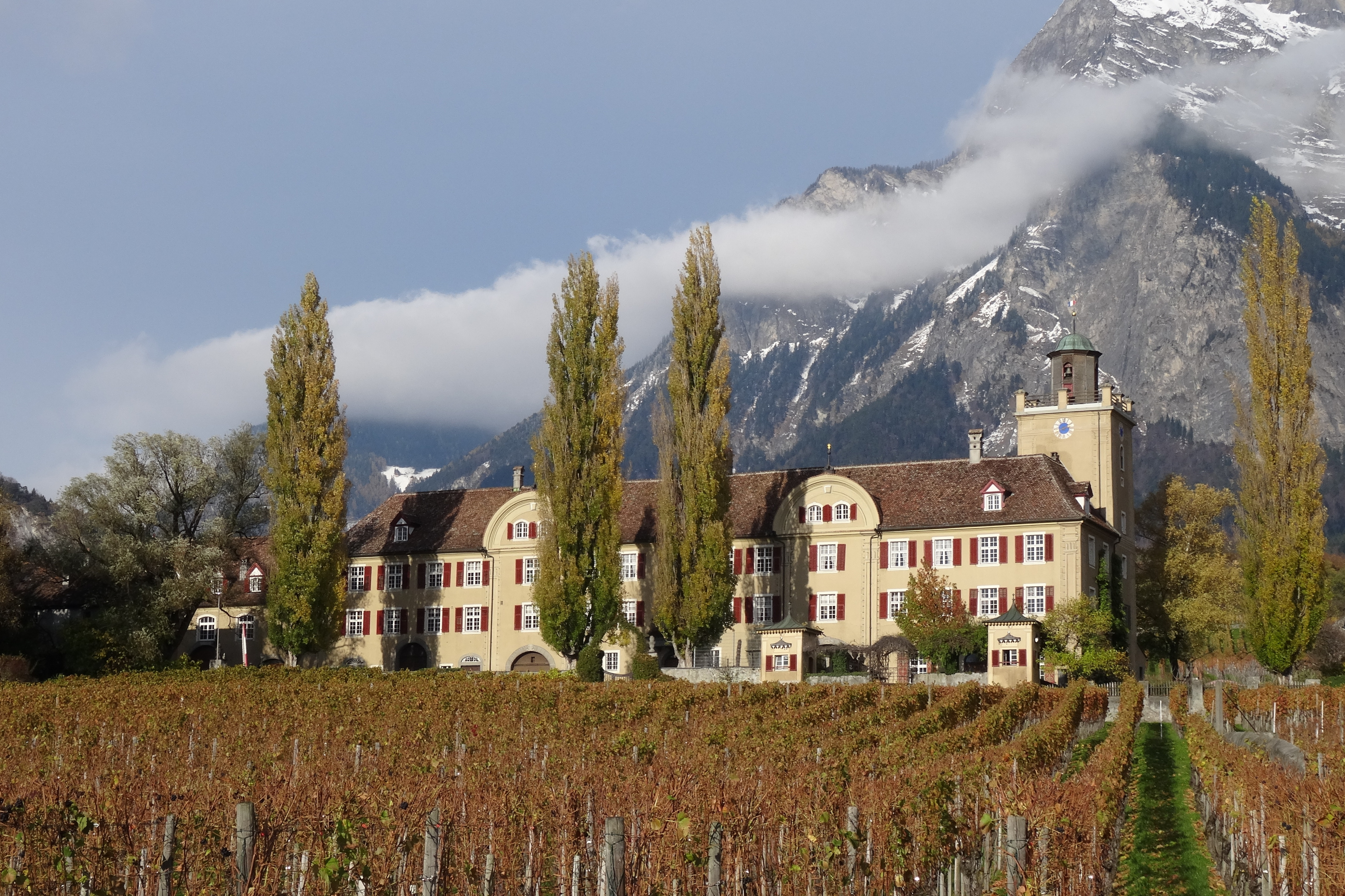
Salenegg Castle, Switzerland

She lived in Salenegg Castle most of her life, and she died at there on 29 October 1918, at 82.

== Literature ==
- Braun-Blanquet, Josias. Maria Barbara Flandrina Gugelberg von Moos in Salenegg b. Mayenfeld geb. 6. Feb. 1836 gest. 29. Oktober 1918. Switzerland, Buchdr. Sprecher, Eggerling, 1919.
- Authors of Plant Names: A List of Authors of Scientific Names of Plants, with Recommended Standard Forms of Their Names, Including Abbreviations. United Kingdom, Royal Botanic Gardens, Kew, 1992.

== Selected publications ==
- von Moos, Marie Gugelberg. Contributions to the liver moss flora of Eastern Switzerland . Jos. Casanova's heirs, 1913.
- Sprecher, Anton von, and Gugelberg von Moos, Marie. Stammbaum u[nd] Familienchronik der von Moos u[nd] Gugelberg von Moos. Switzerland, Verlag nicht ermittelbar, 1933.
