= Hortensia von Moos =

Swiss scholar

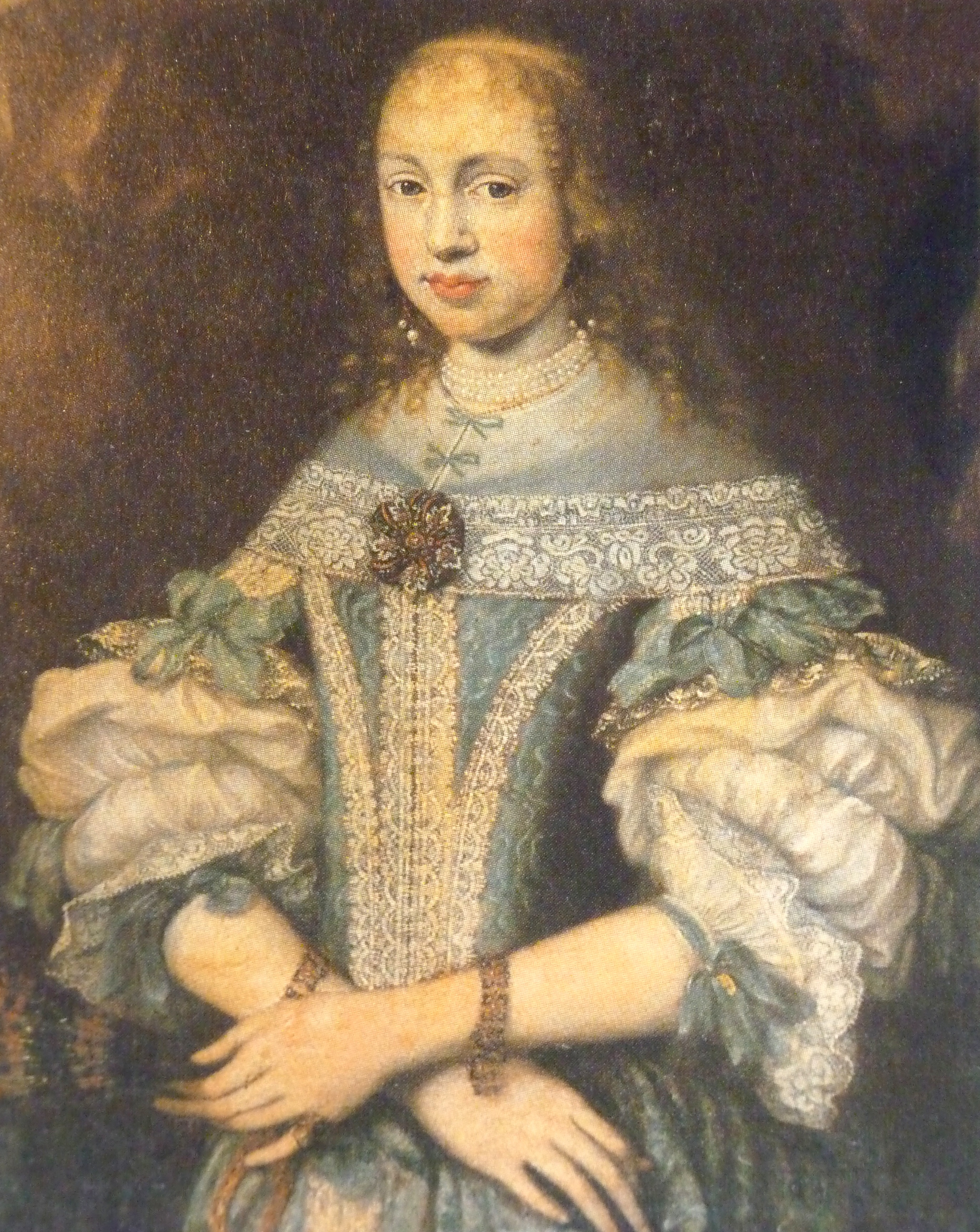
Hortensia Gugelberg von Moos

Hortensia von Moos (1659 in Maienfeld, Switzerland – 2 July 1715 also Maienfeld, Switzerland) was a Swiss scholar who was also known as Hortensia von Salis. She had extensive knowledge of many subjects, including theology and medicine, but she is known for her writings on the status of women.

== Life ==
Hortensia was the eldest child of the Maienfeld town reeve, Gubert von Salis and his wife, Ursula von Salis. She grew up in Maienfeld and was taught by a tutor. She later continued her education through self-study. In 1682 she married Rudolf Gugelberg von Moos . Their children died young and her husband died about 1692 in a battle in the service of France.

Hortensia pursued her studies, especially in natural history and corresponded with scholars such as Johann Heinrich Heidegger and Johann Jakob Scheuchzer . She was a successful practitioner of natural medicine and patients came from far to seek treatment from her. She is also said to have been one of the first women to perform a post-mortem examination after the death of a servant. Her house was a meeting place in Maienfeld for educated people she corresponded with scientists from different universities and faculties.

Her writings were published under the pseudonym "Aristocratic Lady." They often examined religious questions, and asked the same right to liberty and equality in the realm of the mind for both men and women.

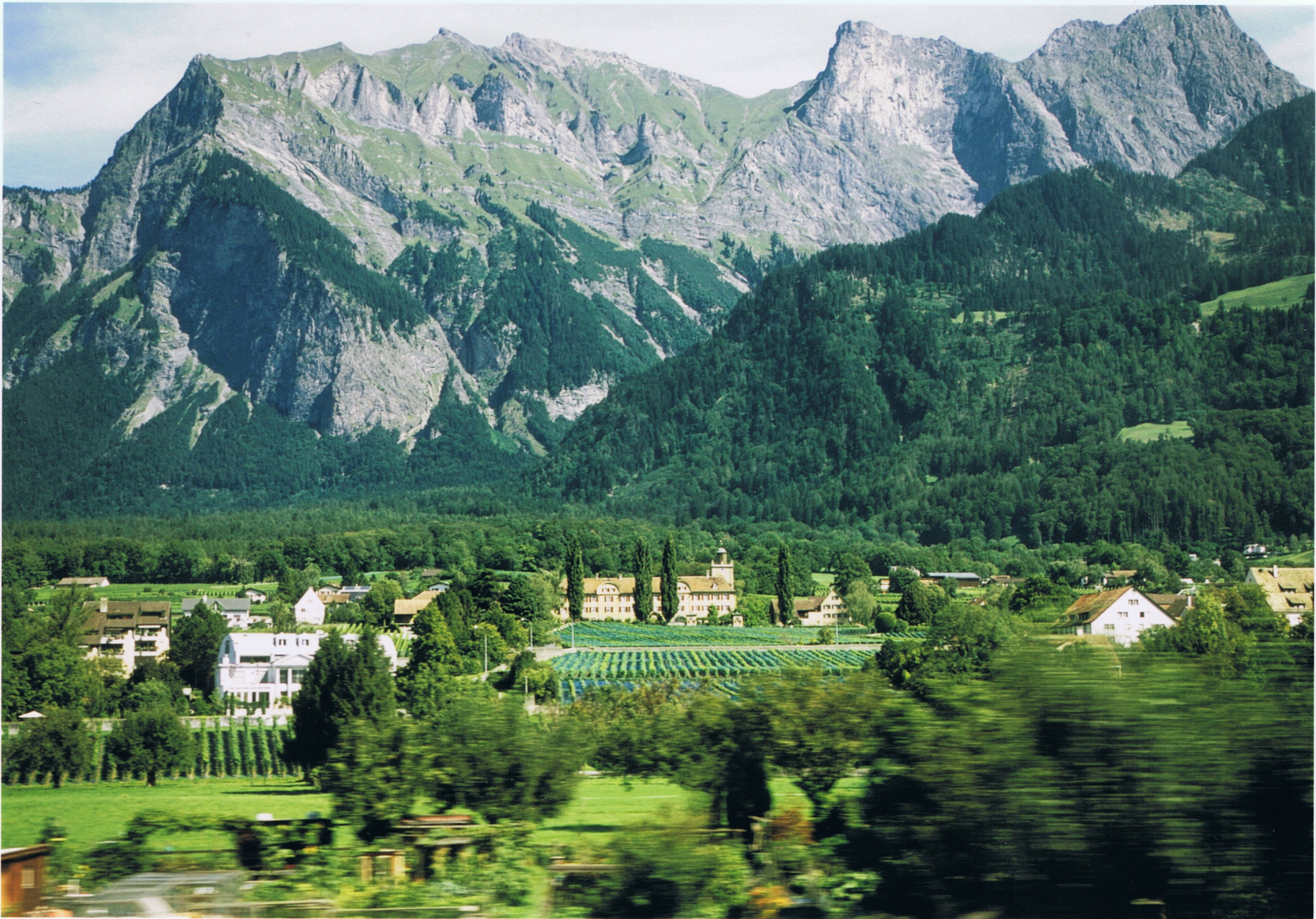
View of Maienfeld from the south (2009).

Hortensia Gugelberg von Moos died in Maienfeld at the age of 56 years.

Today she is regarded as a seminal figure by the Swiss women's movement.

== Works ==
- Mr. Widmer, eds., Glaubens-Rechenschafft, ConversationsGespräche, Gebät, 2003 Archive - AFAM, Maienfeld Printed sources.
- Mr. Anosi, Leichenpredigt für Hortensia von Salis, 1715.
- L. von Planta, Bündner Porträts, 1979.
- C.Nöthiger-Strahm "Hortensia von Gugelberg" in Schritte Offene ins, 2l, 1991, No. 4, 9-13.

== Sources ==
- J. Jurgen Seidel . SALIS, of Hortensia In: Biographic-Bibliographic Church Encyclopedia (BBKL). Volume 8, Herzberg 1994, ISBN 3-88309-053-0, 1230-1231 Sp.
- Salis, of Hortensia: Creates Faith-computing; Conversations talks; Gebät. ed and with a foreword by Maya Widmer. Haupt, Bern 2003,ISBN 3-258-06632-9 ( New Series Swiss texts. 19).
- Renate Strohmeyer: Lexikon der Naturwissenschaftlerinnen Dictionary of nature and natural scientists knowledgeable women in Europe :from antiquity to the 20th Century . Renate Strohmeier, Page 123.
- Hortensia von Moos Gugelberg born von Salis Maya Widmer, riforma.net, Bern
- Hortensia von Salis, Lili Frey, Zürich : Universität Zürich, 1920. Thesis (Ph. D.)--Universität Zürich.
