= Salenegg Castle =

Castle in Maienfeld, Switzerland

Coordinates: 47°00′38″N 9°31′43″E

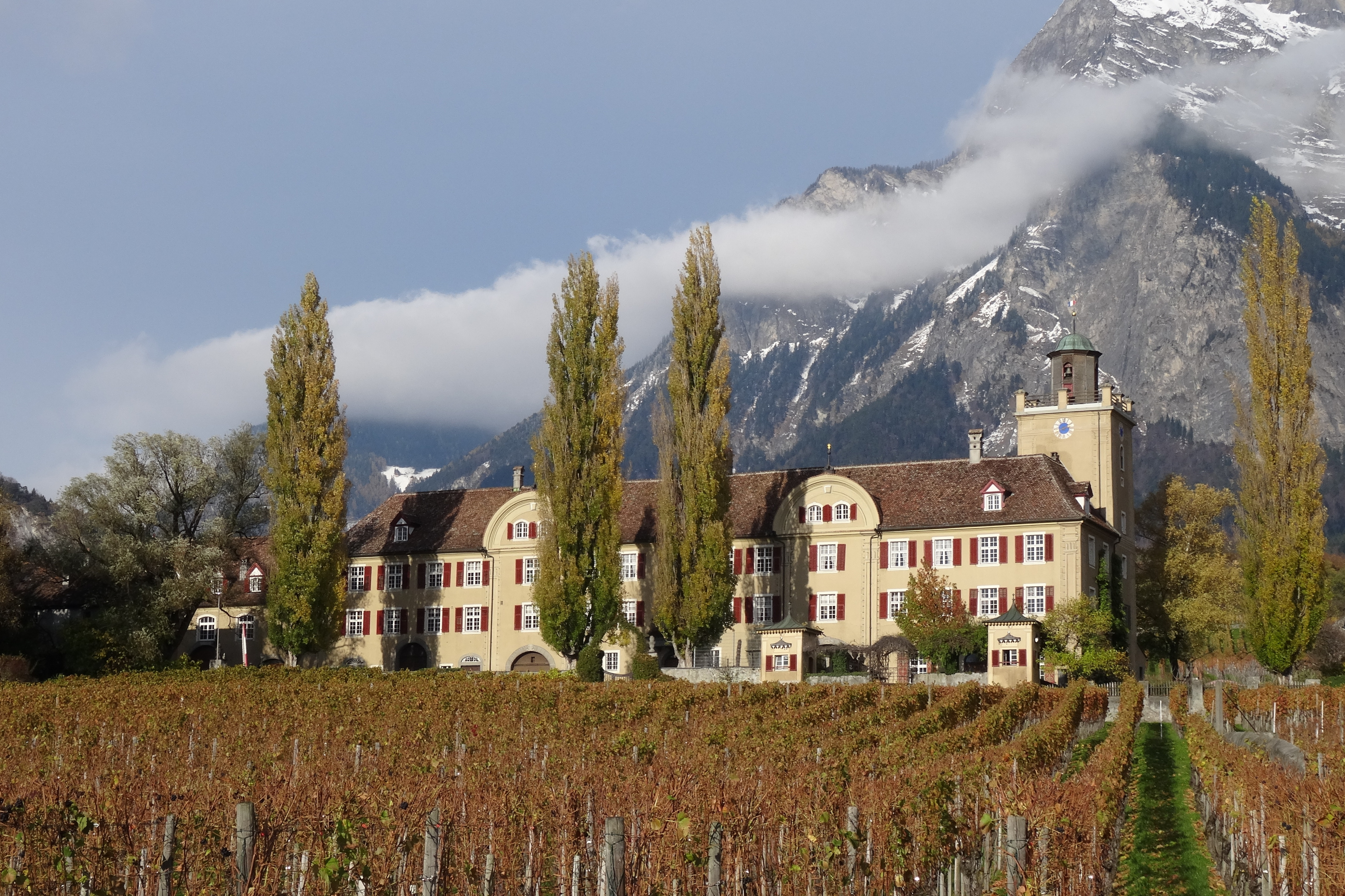
Salenegg Castle

Salenegg Castle is a castle in the municipality of Maienfeld of the Canton of Graubünden in Switzerland. It is a Swiss heritage site of national significance.

== Notable residents ==
- Maria Gugelberg von Moos

== See also ==
- List of castles in Switzerland
