= Maienfeld =

- Municipality
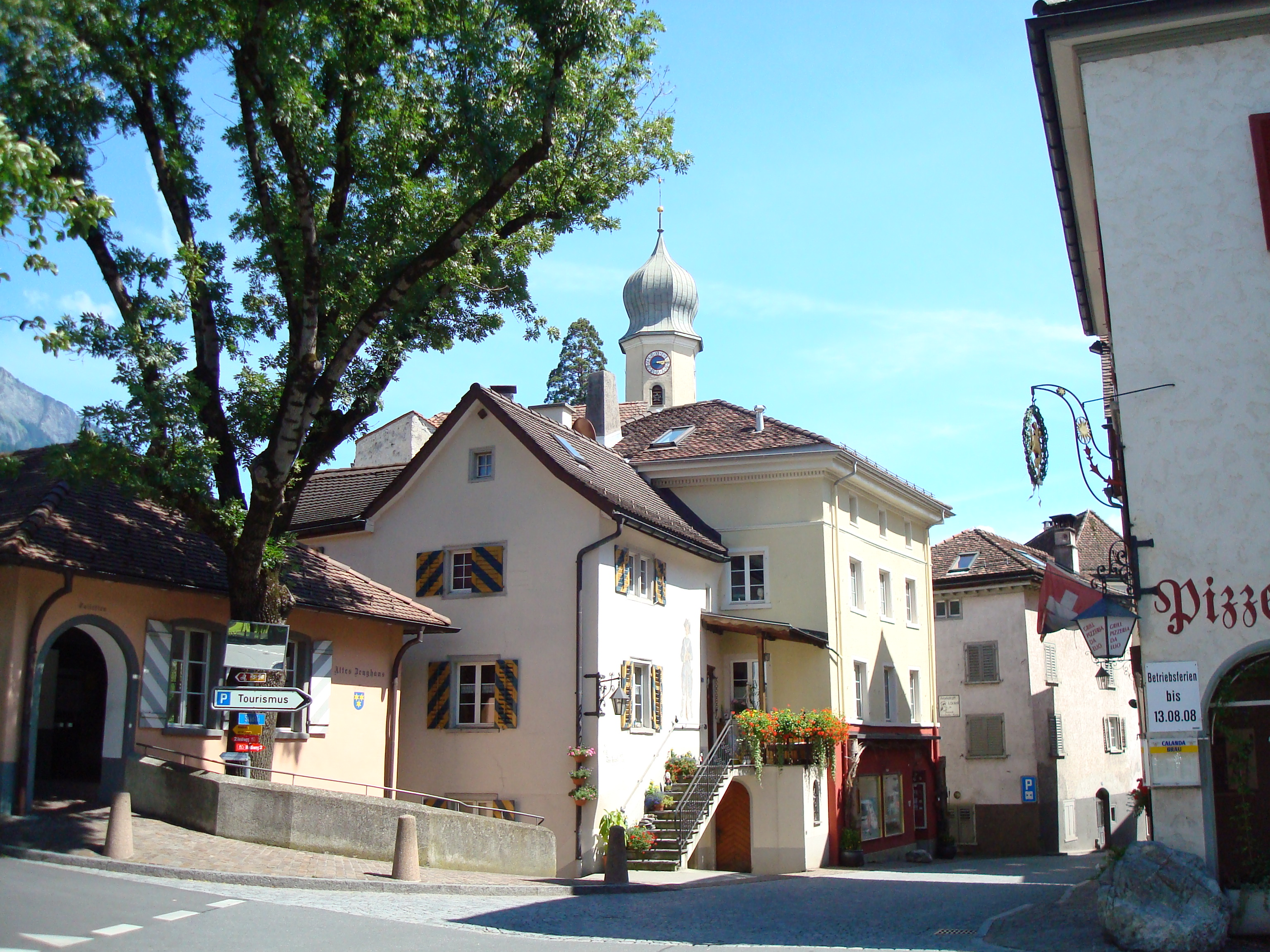

- Flag Coat of arms
- Location of Maienfeld
- Location within Switzerland Location within Canton of Grisons
- Coordinates: 47°0′N 9°33′E
- Country: Switzerland
- Canton: Grisons
- District: Landquart

Government
  - Mayor: Stadtpräsident; Max Leuener (as of 2012)

Area
  - Total: 32.34 km^{2} (12.49 sq mi)
- Elevation: 635 m (2,083 ft)
- Highest elevation (Hinter Grauspitz): 2,574 m (8,445 ft)

Population (December 2015)
  - Total: 2,767
  - Density: 85.56/km^{2} (221.6/sq mi)
- Time zone: UTC+01:00 (CET)
  - Summer (DST): UTC+02:00 (CEST)
- Postal code: 7304
- SFOS number: 3953
- ISO 3166 code: CH-GR
- Surrounded by: Bad Ragaz (SG), Balzers (FL), Fläsch, Igis, Jenins, Malans, Mastrils, Nenzing (AT-8), Schaan (FL), Seewis im Prättigau, Triesen (FL), Zizers
- Website: maienfeld.ch

Maienfeld (Romansh: Maiavilla) is a municipality in the Landquart Region of the Swiss canton of Grisons. It is a tourist destination in the Alps, both because of the local wine and because it was the setting of the story Heidi.

== History ==
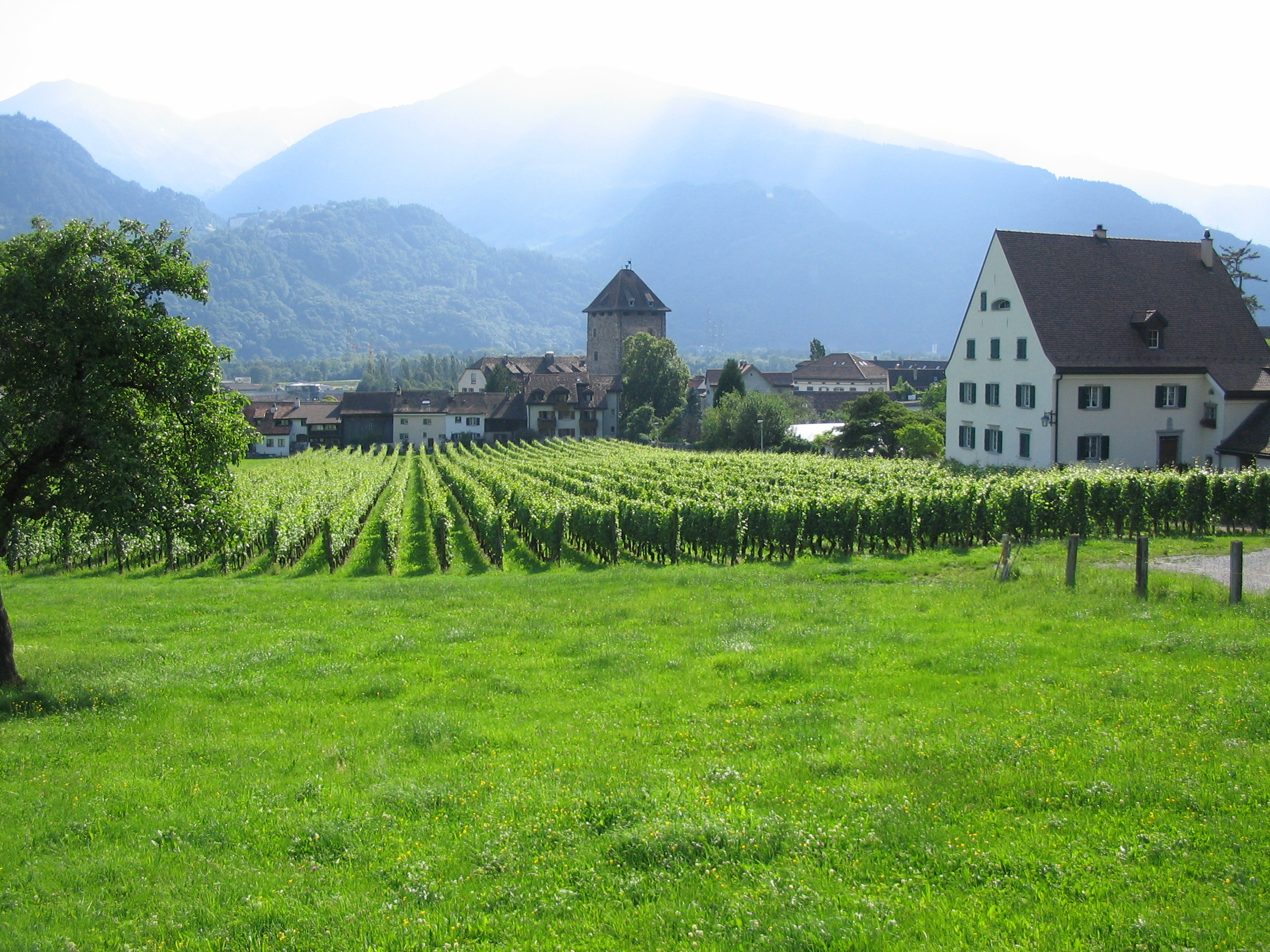
Schloss Brandis with vineyards in the foreground

Maienfeld lies along a key route through the Rhine Valley in the Alps. Prehistoric Bronze work and a pre-Roman cellar have been found in the city and on St. Luzisteig hill. A 3rd-century Roman station or settlement has been found along the old Roman Road. The 4th or 5th century Tabula Peutingeriana map shows a place called Magia near modern Maienfeld.

The village is first mentioned in 831 and was known as Lupinis at that time. The name of the village changed several times over the following centuries and included; Magenza, Lopine, Maging and Magen zu Luppinis. Finally, in 1295 the name Maienvelt was used, which eventually became Maienfeld.

From the mid 10th century until the mid 12th century, the counts of Bregenz ruled Maienfeld. Their castle at Maienfeld was destroyed in 1079 by Henry IV, HRE during the Investiture Controversy. The current Schloss Brandis was initially built in 1270–75 by the von den Aspermont family and later by Friedrich VII, count of Toggenburg. In 1465 it was rebuilt and expanded by the Baron von Brandis. The town was also fortified in the 13th century. A 4.5 m (15 ft) tall and 1 m (3.3 ft) thick section of wall is still standing today. The town walls enclosed an area of about 120 m × 170 m (390 ft × 560 ft). The walls were thickened and raised to 9.6 m (31 ft) in the 14th century and then, in a third phase, topped with 1.8 m (5.9 ft) thick crenellations and raised to 10.5 m (34 ft).

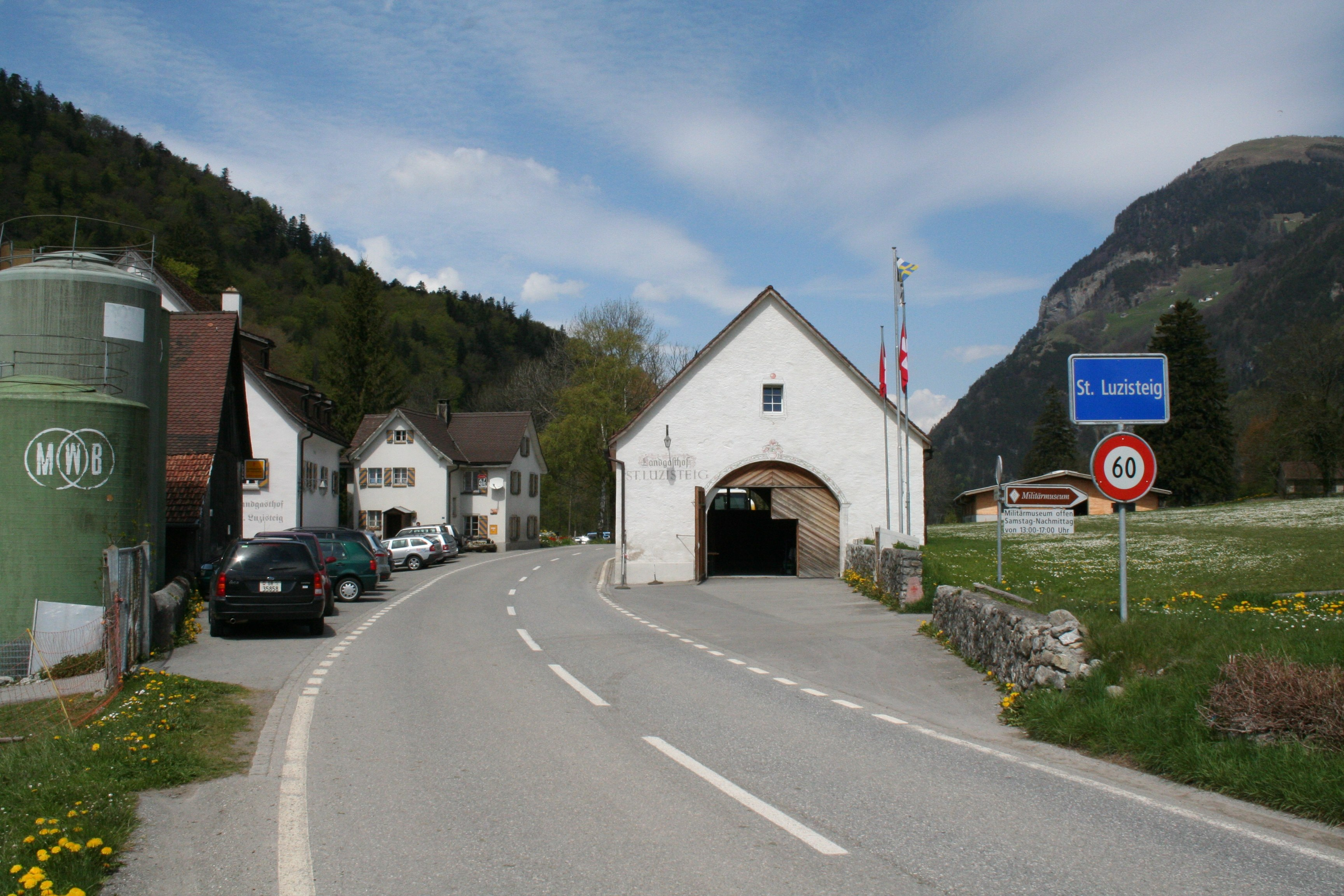
St. Luzisteig pass

Maienfeld is first mentioned as a town in 1346, however it seems to have lacked a town government (until 1437) or guilds. In 1388, Maienfeld acquired the right to charge a toll on the Roman Road that led from Chur over the St. Luzisteig to the north. Maienfeld also had a market, though the neighboring city of Malans had the market right. Following the death of the Toggenburger line, Maienfeld joined the League of the Ten Jurisdictions in 1436. In 1438 the city reached an agreement with the von Brandis and von Aarburg (inheritors of some Toggenburg lands) families. The agreement gave Maienfeld a set of rights and gave the city the right to Low Justice over the communities of Malans and Jenins.

During the 14th century, the Walser moved into the Maienfeld area and founded settlements that eventually became the Walser part of town. However, it would take several centuries until the Walser were granted full citizen rights. Maienfeld had been fully Romansh before this time, but during the Germanic-speaking Walser immigration Maienfeld became Germanized. By the 16th century, the region was nearly completely Germanic.

Aerial view from 400 m by Walter Mittelholzer (1924)

In 1458, the town was devastated by a fire. During the 1499 Swabian War, Maienfeld was forced to open its gates to the invading Austrian army. After the Austrians left the area, it was attacked by Three Leagues troops who plundered the town. In 1509, the Three Leagues bought Maienfeld from the von Brandis and put the city under the Protectorate of the Three Leagues. This led to an unusual situation where Maienfeld, as a voting member of the League of the Ten Jurisdictions and therefore a voting member of the Three Leagues, was also under the protection and control of the Three Leagues. Maienfeld indirectly set policy for managing Maienfeld.

In 1529, the Tardis bridge was built over the Rhine river, shifting trade routes away from Maienfeld. In 1622 and again in 1720 the town was heavily damaged due to fire.

It was the home of the scholar Hortensia von Moos (1659–1715) who is known for her writings on the status of women.

== Description ==
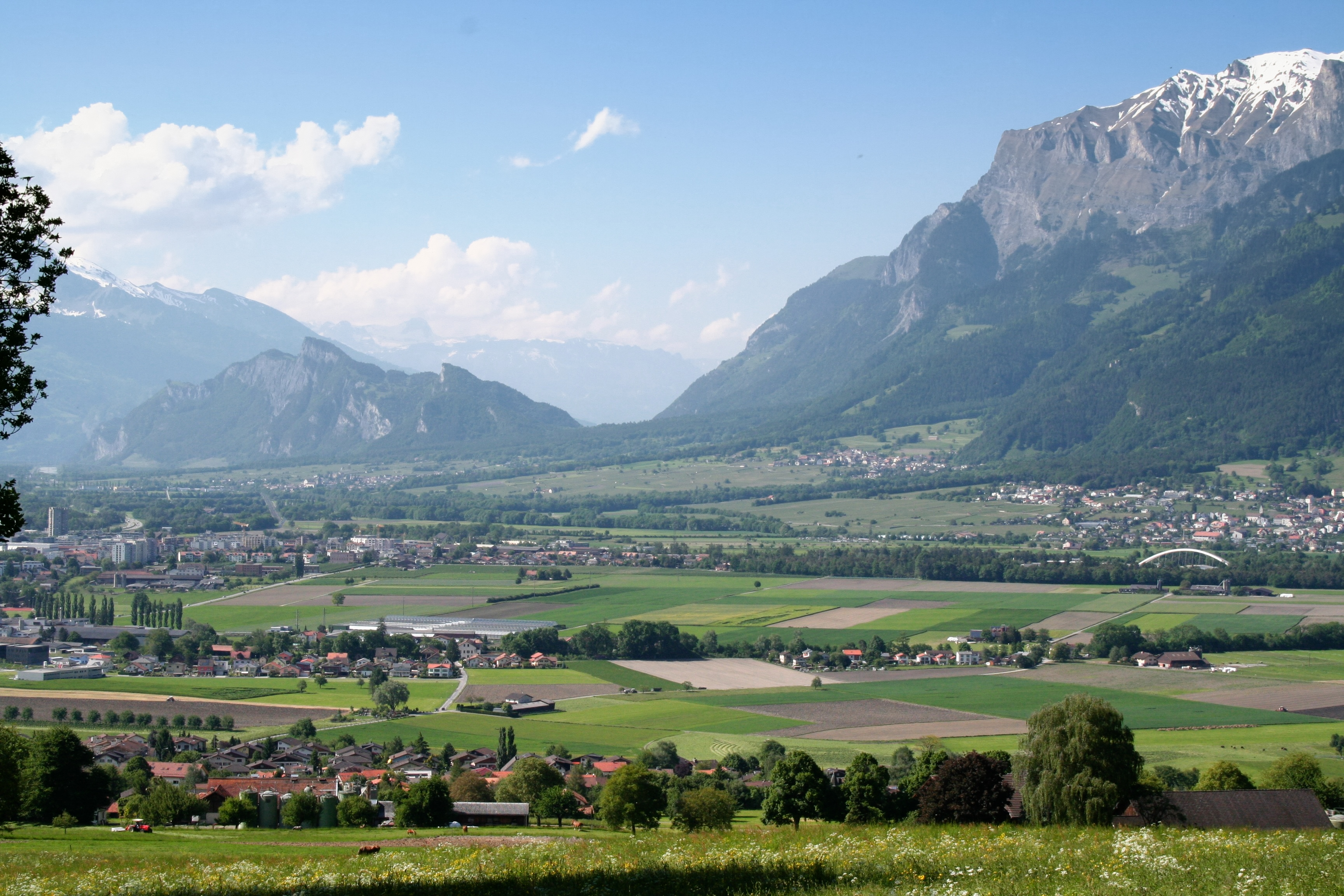
Chur Rhein valley, (l to r) Landquart, Maienfeld, Jenins and Malans

Maienfeld is located 8 kilometers (5.0 mi) southeast of Sargans in the lower Chur Rhein valley. It is bordered on the west by Bad Ragaz, Canton of St. Gallen and on the west and north by the community of Fläsch, Canton Grisons. To the north, it is bordered by Balzers, Triesen, Schaan, the country of Liechtenstein, Nenzing and Vorarlberg, Austria. To the east is the community of Seewis im Prättigau, Canton Grisons. To the southwest Jenins und Malans, Canton Grisons. In the south it is bordered by Igis and Zizers, Canton Grisons, as well as in the southwest the community of Mastrils, Canton Grisons.

Maienfeld is located on the right side of the Rhein valley and includes the boroughs of; Bovel, Rofels und St. Luzisteig. St. Luzisteig is the site of an important alpine pass, which leads into Liechtenstein, and is guarded by an 18th-century fortress that is now barracks for the Swiss Army.

The old Walser settlement Stürfis was abandoned by 1633 and became a part of Maienfeld, when the inhabitants moved to Rofels. In contrast, the Walser settlement Guscha was occupied until 1969 when the last two families were bought out by the Swiss Army and the village became part of their training area.

Maienfeld has an area, (as of the 2004/09 survey) of 32.33 km^{2} (12.48 sq mi). Of this area, about 43.1% is used for agricultural purposes, while 31.9% is forested. Of the rest of the land, 5.8% is settled (buildings or roads) and 19.2% is unproductive land. In the 2004/09 survey a total of 76 ha (190 acres) or about 2.3% of the total area was covered with buildings, an increase of 14 ha (35 acres) over the 1984/85 amount. About 0.22% of the total area is recreational space.

Of the agricultural land, 127 ha (310 acres) is used for orchards and vineyards, 604 ha (1,490 acres) is fields and grasslands and 745 ha (1,840 acres) consists of alpine grazing areas. Since 1984/85 the amount of agricultural land has decreased by 72 ha (180 acres). Over the same time period the amount of forested land has increased by 59 ha (150 acres). Rivers and lakes cover 69 ha (170 acres) in the municipality.

The train station in the city is located at 502 m (1,647 ft) above sea level. The highest point in the city boundaries is the Hinterer Grauspitz mountain, which is 2,574 m (8,445 ft) high.

== Demographics ==
Maienfeld has a population (as of December 2020) of 3,029. As of 2015, 11.0% of the population are resident foreign nationals. Over the last 5 years (2010-2015) the population has changed at a rate of 8.34%. The birth rate in the municipality, in 2015, was 9.4, while the death rate was 10.2 per thousand residents.

In 2015 there were 1,238 private households in Maienfeld with an average household size of 2.21 persons. In 2015 about 51.3% of all buildings in the municipality were single family homes, which is about the same as the percentage in the canton (49.4%) and less than the percentage nationally (57.4%). Of the 582 inhabited buildings in the municipality, in 2000, about 49.3% were single family homes and 25.1% were multiple family buildings. Additionally, about 30.6% of the buildings were built before 1919, while 19.8% were built between 1991 and 2000. In 2014 the rate of construction of new housing units per 1000 residents was 1.82. The vacancy rate for the municipality, in 2016, was 4.29%.

Most of the population (as of 2000) speaks German (92.1%), with Portuguese being second most common (1.5%) and Romansh being third (1.4%).

As of 2000, the gender distribution of the population was 50.1% male and 49.9% female. As of 2015, children and teenagers (0–19 years old) make up 19.4% of the population, while adults (20–64 years old) are 62.0% of the population and seniors (over 64 years old) make up 18.6%. In 2015 there were 1,204 single residents, 1,180 people who were married or in a civil partnership, 158 widows or widowers and 225 divorced residents.

The historical population is given in the following chart:

== Tourism ==
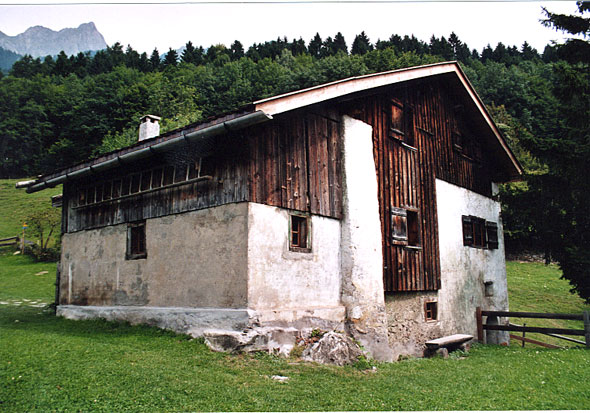
Heidihaus in Maienfeld

Johanna Spyri's classic book Heidi is largely set in Maienfeld.

== Heritage sites of national significance ==
Both Brandis Castle and Salenegg Castle are listed as Swiss heritage sites of national significance.

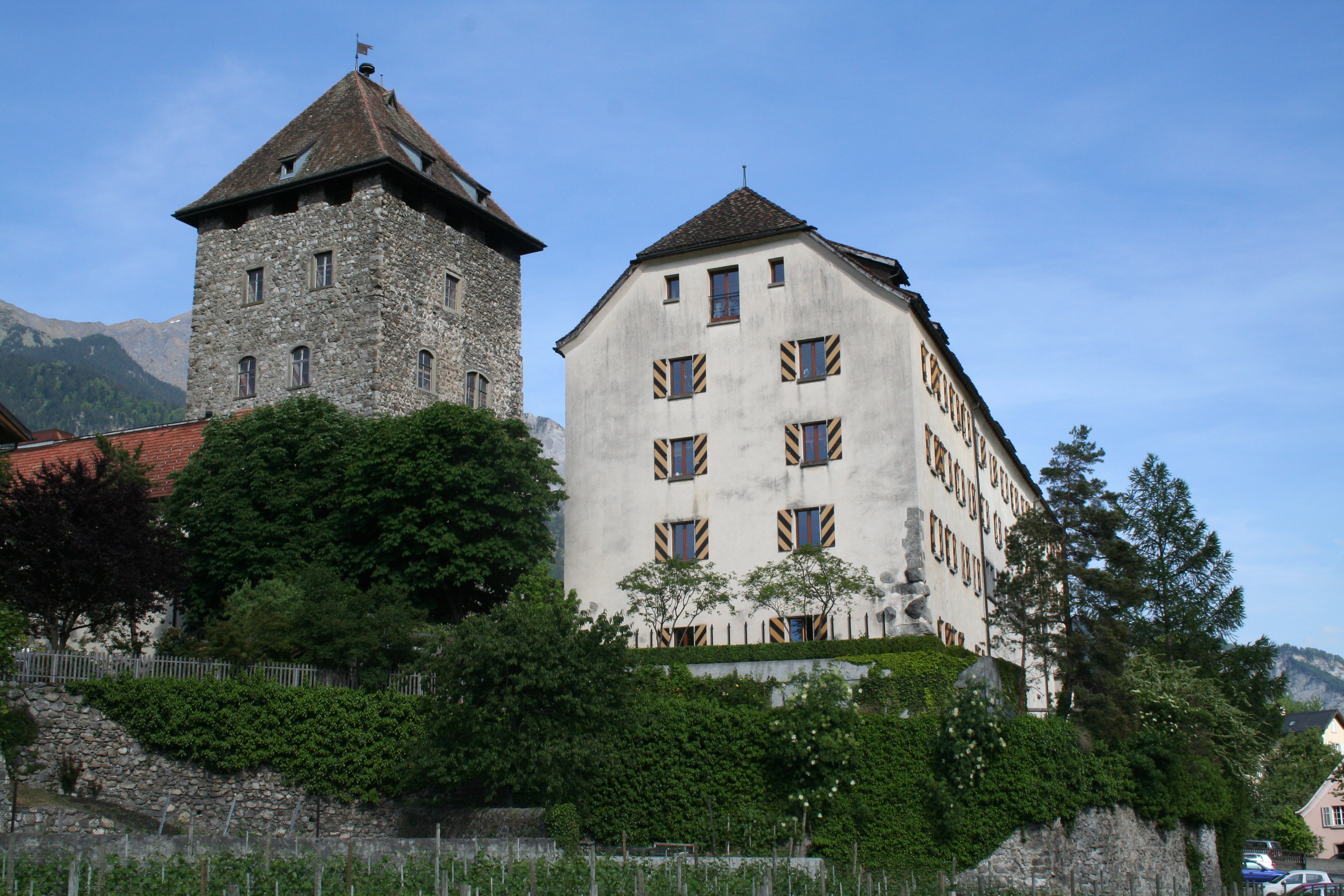
Brandis Castle

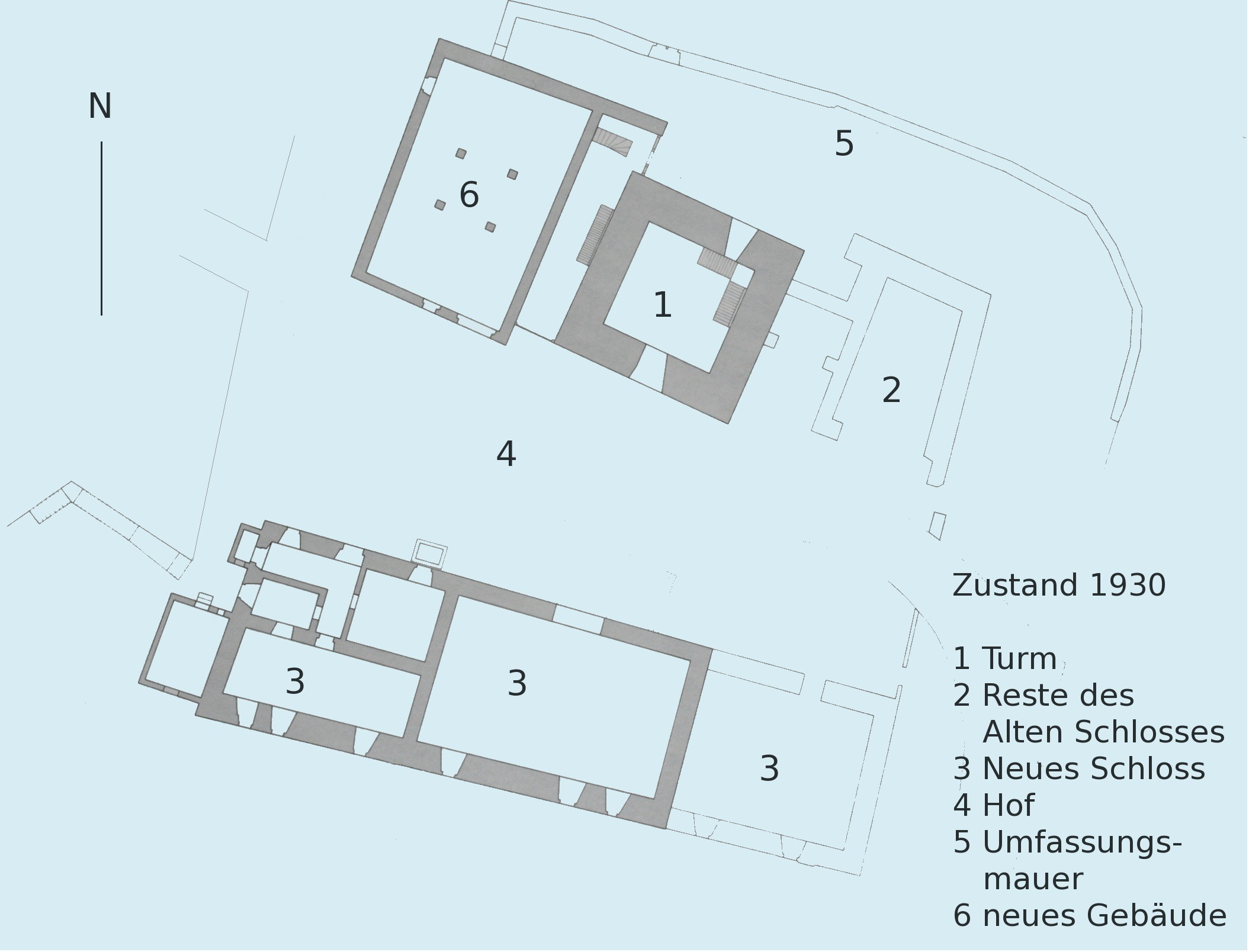
Brandis Castle floorplan

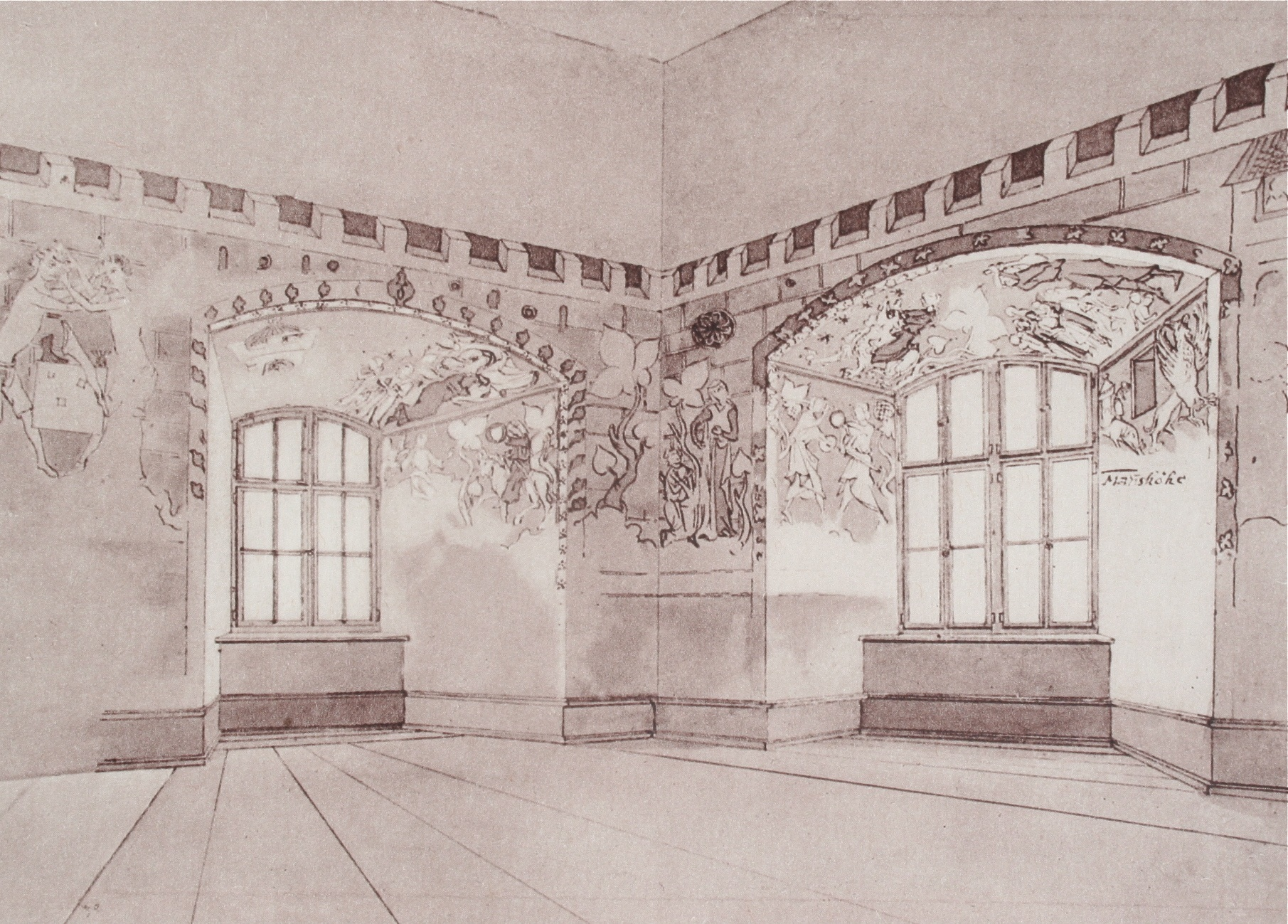
Sketch of the paintings inside Brandis Castle

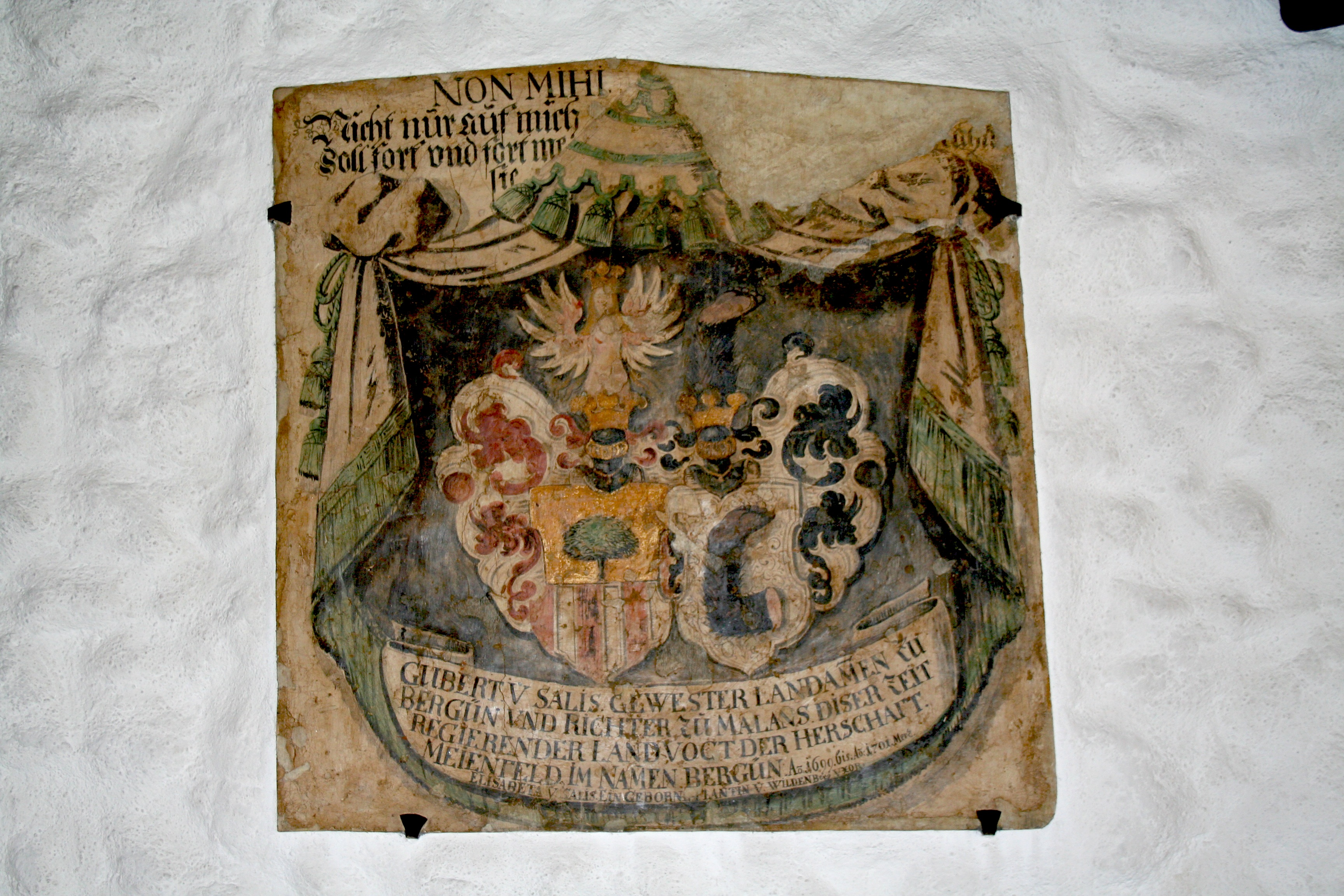
Coat of Arms at Brandis Castle

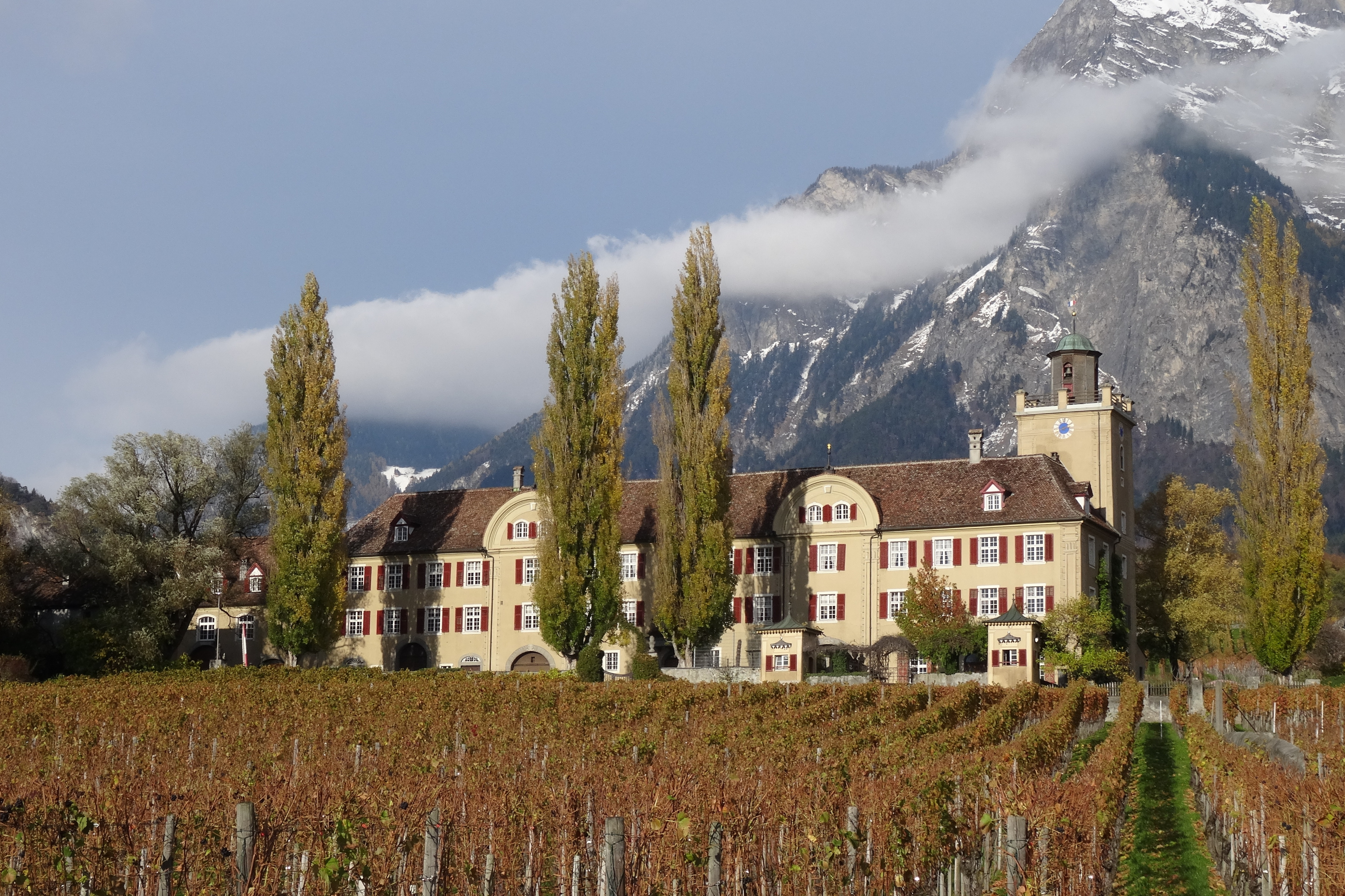
Salenegg Castle

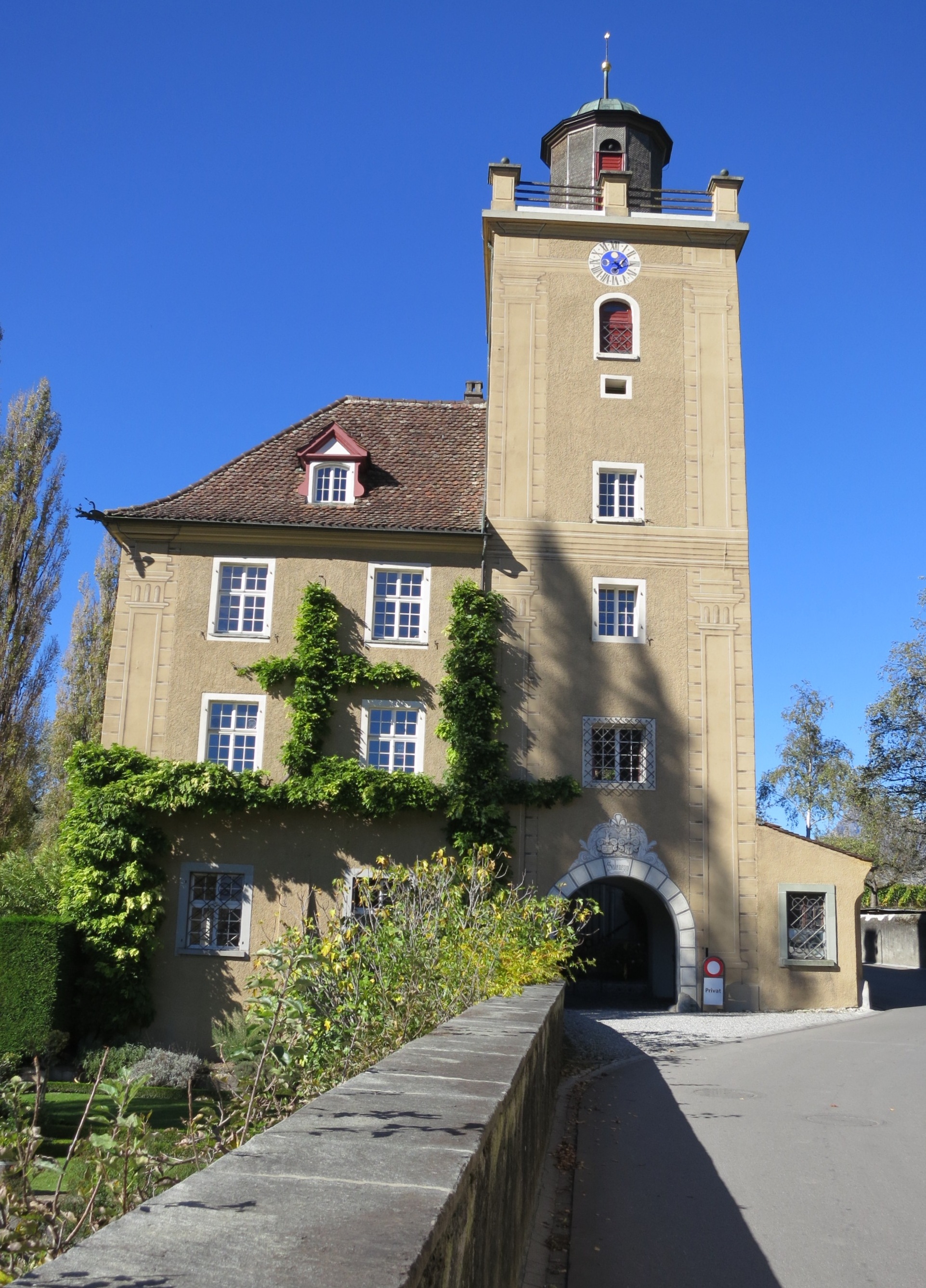
Salenegg Castle tower

== Politics ==
In the 2015 federal election the most popular party was the SVP with 34.8% of the vote. The next three most popular parties were the FDP (16.9%), the FDP (16.9%) and the SP (13.3%). In the federal election, a total of 1,052 votes were cast, and the voter turnout was 50.7%. The 2015 election saw the percentage that the BDP received dropped from 22.1% (in 2011) to 16.9%.

In the 2007 federal election the most popular party was the SVP which received 42% of the vote. The next three most popular parties were the FDP (28.7%), the SP (20%) and the CVP (8%).

== Education ==
In Maienfeld about 79.1% of the population (between age 25–64) have completed either non-mandatory upper secondary education or additional higher education (either university or a Fachhochschule).

== Economy ==
Maienfeld is a mixed agricultural and tertiary community, a municipality where agriculture and the tertiary sector play a significant role in the economy.

As of 2014, there were a total of 1,750 people employed in the municipality. Of these, a total of 173 people worked in 57 businesses in the primary economic sector. The secondary sector employed 499 workers in 52 separate businesses. A minority (24.8%) of the secondary sector employees worked in very small businesses. There were 10 small businesses with a total of 228 employees and two mid sized businesses with a total of 147 employees. Finally, the tertiary sector provided 1,078 jobs in 227 businesses. There were 14 small businesses with a total of 300 employees and 3 mid sized businesses with a total of 258 employees.

In 2015 a total of 1.8% of the population received social assistance. In 2011 the unemployment rate in the municipality was 1.5%.

In 2015 local hotels had a total of 28,619 overnight stays, of which 47.1% were international visitors.

In 2015 the average cantonal, municipal and church tax rate in the municipality for a couple with two children making SFr 80,000 was 3.3% while the rate for a single person making SFr 150,000 was 14.1%. The canton has an average tax rate for those making SFr 80,000 and an average rate for those making SFr 150,000. In 2013 the average income in the municipality per tax payer was SFr 85,722 and the per person average was SFr 43,132, which is greater than the cantonal averages of SFr 69,964 and SFr 33,075 respectively It is also greater than the national per tax payer average of SFr 82,682 and the per person average of SFr 35,825.

== Religion ==
From the 2000 census, 689 or 29.1% are Roman Catholic, while 1,384 or 58.4% belonged to the Swiss Reformed Church. Of the rest of the population, there are 20 individuals (or about 0.84% of the population) who belong to the Orthodox Church, and there are 32 individuals (or about 1.35% of the population) who belong to another Christian church. There are 35 (or about 1.48% of the population) who are Islamic. There are 5 individuals (or about 0.21% of the population) who belong to another church (not listed on the census), 129 (or about 5.45% of the population) belong to no church, are agnostic or atheist, and 74 individuals (or about 3.13% of the population) did not answer the question.

== Transport ==
Maienfeld sits on the Chur–Rorschach railway between Sargans and Chur and is served by local trains at Maienfeld railway station.

== Notable people ==
Generalstabschef Oberst von Sprecher

- Hortensia von Moos (1659 in Maienfeld – 1715 also Maienfeld) a Swiss scholar known for her writings on the status of women
- Theophil Sprecher von Bernegg (1850 in Maienfeld – 1927) a Swiss politician and military Chief of the General Staff 1905–1919
- Heidi is a work of children's fiction published in 1881 by Swiss author Johanna Spyri, Heidi came from Maienfeld
- John Knittel (1891–1970 in Maienfeld) a Swiss writer, lived in Maienfeld
- Fridolin Sulser (1926–2016) a Swiss-American pharmacologist who specialized in the treatment of mental disorders, brought up in Maienfeld, emigrated to the US in 1958
- Heinz Nigg (born 1949) a Swiss anthropologist, community artist, and video activist from Maienfeld
