= Rheintaler Ribelmais =

Maize-based food from the Rhine Valley

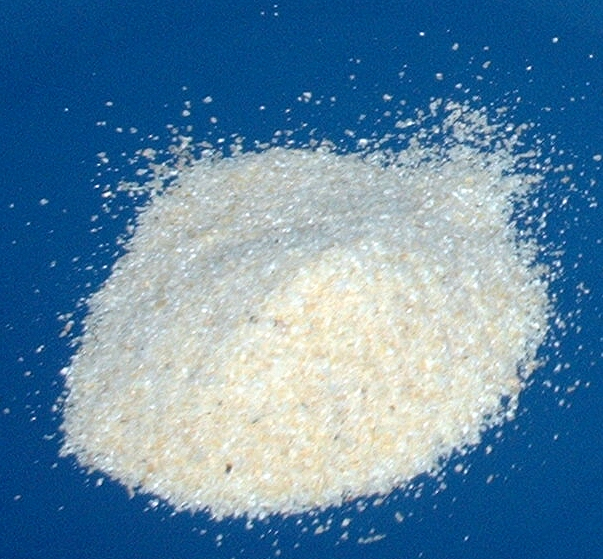
Milled Rheintaler Ribelmais, so-called Ribelmehl.

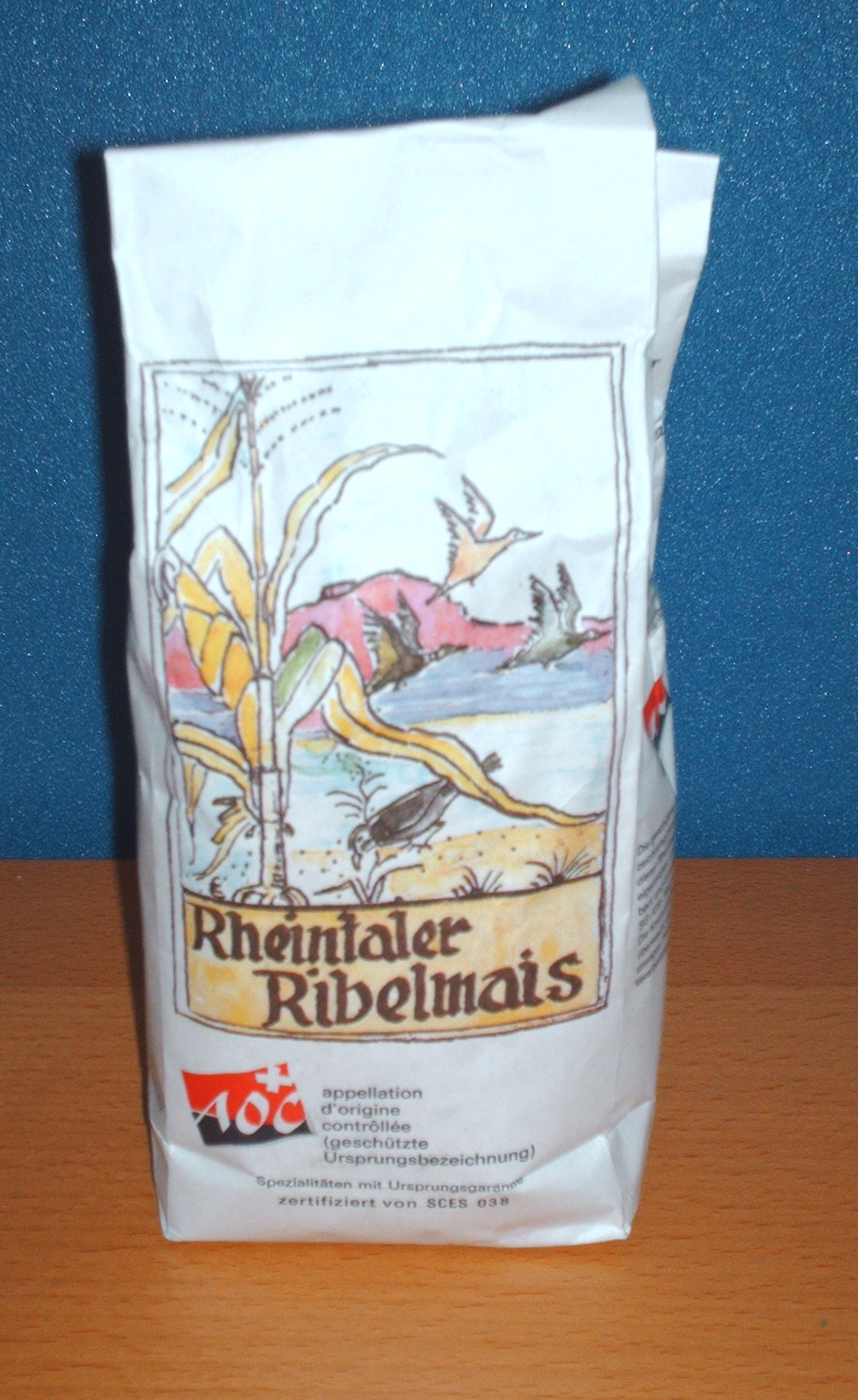
Rheintaler Ribelmais - AOC package (AOP since 2013)

Rheintaler Ribelmais, Rheintaler Ribel, or Türggenribel is a ground product made from a traditional type of maize grown in the Swiss Rhine Valley and Liechtenstein. Since summer 2000, Rheintaler Ribel AOP (formerly AOC) has been the only Swiss cereal product with a protected geographical indication. The name Ribelmais comes from the traditional dish, Ribel, which is made from it.

== History ==
Maize plays an important role in the Rhine valley, including three regions from different countries: in municipalities in the cantons of St. Gallen & Grisons (Switzerland), Principality of Liechtenstein and Vorarlberg (Austria). The rhine valley, which runs from south to north here, is influenced by Foehn wind and thus has a milder climate than the surrounding area, which is why maize could establish there. Maize is important in all three regions in their culture as well as in their economic history.

Rheintaler Ribelmais has a large genetic diversity, since the best cobs were used in small-scale cultivation for new crops and, through centuries of artificial selection, varieties have been chosen that are optimally adapted to local conditions. In general, Ribelmais is characterised by the fact that it grows much better in spring under cool conditions than today's silage maize, which is why it has been used in recent years in Switzerland for producing new varieties.

== History and tradition in Switzerland and in the Principality of Liechtenstein ==
The cultivation of maize in Rhine valley is first reported in 1571 in Altstaetten. At that time, it was thought that it came from the Balkans, which is why the name Türggen or Türggenkorn (Turkish corn) became used for maize. After maize was established in the Rhine valley, it was eaten as a porridge breakfast dish “Ribel”. That's what it's called until today and where the name Rheintaler Ribelmais comes from. The cultivation of Ribelmais in Liechtenstein was first mentioned in a note from 1713, which said that maize had been first cultivated in 1680 in Liechtenstein. In 1871 60% of the arable land in Liechtenstein were cultivated with Maize. Maize and potatoes were the staple food of the people.

Traditionally every family grew its own maize in the garden or on the field. After harvest, the husks of the maize cobs had to be removed in order that the cob could dry well. For this occasion, it was tradition, that the whole family would meet and did this together. After the cobs were peeled down to two or four husks, the remaining husks were tied together, so the cobs could be hung in the screed to dry for a few months. This event, which is called “Usschellete” or “Hülschete” (depending on region) was one of the most important events in the whole year.

The cultivation land of Ribelmais decreased significantly from the 1960s to 1990s, until there were only about 4 ha left in the 1990s. In 1998 an association of different producers, processors and farmers was founded which had the aim to promote the cultivation of Rheintaler Ribelmais again. They also want to ensure high quality of products and seed, strengthen the food value chain in the region, and preserve the tradition and the genetic diversity. Through the efforts of the association there are nowadays again 65 ha of land cultivated with Rheintaler Ribelmais. The association produces the seeds and distributes them to the farmers.

To ensure the high quality of the product the Rheintaler Ribelmais were labelled as AOP (Appellation d’Origine Protégée) in 2000. This label stands for traditional products and has a defined area where it can be produced.

== Growing areas ==
The area where Ribelmais is grown is limited to the north-south Rhine valley above Lake Constance:

- the municipalities of Rheintal, Sarganserland and Werdenberg in the Canton of St. Gallen
- the municipalities of Fläsch, Jenins, Landquart, Maienfeld, Malans, Untervaz and Zizers in the Canton of Grisons
- the Principality of Liechtenstein

== Processing ==
After the harvest, which begins in mid-September, the grains are transported to the storehouses. The only operating storehouse for Rheintaler Ribelmais is the Lütolf AG in St. Margrethen (SG). After arrival, the grains are hot-air dried at about 50 °C for a day, this is the main difference to the traditional processing, where the whole cobs usually get air-dried on racks. From now on, the grains can be stored for up to two years. For further processing the grains are transferred to the “Meyerhans Mühlen AG” in Rheineck (SG) where the grains are milled into different degrees of grinding. An important aspect in the production of Ribelmais flour is, that the germ bud is milled together with the endosperm. This results in a distinct, nutty, flavor enhancement.

== Use and products ==
Rheintaler Ribelmais is used for the preparation of food. In the Rhine Valley it is used for the traditional maize dish of the same name. Sometimes it is also used to make polenta. Care must be taken to allow the Ribelmais to swell longer than other varieties. It is further used in a variety of products.

=== Bramata flour ===
The Bramata flour variety is produced by Meyerhans Mühlen AG in Rheineck (SG) and distributed by Lütolf Spezialitäten AG. It differs from the original Ribelmais flour by a larger grain size.

=== Chips ===
Lütolf Spezialitäten AG produces wholegrain chips made entirely out of Ribelmais; the only other ingredients are Swiss sunflower oil and salt.

=== Corn whiskey ===
The production of whiskey containing Ribelmais started in 1999, after the production of spirits from grains was no longer prohibited in Switzerland. The master brewer of Sonnenbräu in Rebstein (SG), Arnold Graf, decided to start the production. The resulting whiskey is marketed under the name Ribel Swisslander Whisky.

=== Beer ===
To celebrate its 100th anniversary in 1991, the Sonnenbräu brewing company announced a new type of beer made with Ribelmais. Since 2008 the beer has been distributed under the registered trademark "Ribelgold". Ribelgold is a light beer with an EBC of 8.5 and an average alcohol content of 5.0%. The mash consists of brewing barley and Rheintaler Ribelmais.

=== Corn poultry ===
The company Geflügel Gourmet AG cooperates with local farmers in the Rhine Valley to produce various poultry, such as geese, poulards and guinea fowl, which are mainly fed on Ribelmais. The resulting poultry is recognizable by its distinct yellowish skin and meat colour as well as its intense aroma.

== Rheintaler Ribelmais within Swiss maize landraces ==
=== Importance of landraces ===
Landraces were the common form for many crops before new breeding techniques were used to develop today's crop varieties, which are grown commercially all over the world. For centuries, crop landraces were the principal focus for agricultural production, where farmers have sowed, harvested and saved seed to use again for the upcoming year. This workflow has enriched the genetic pool through intra-specific diversity. There is a vast heterogeneity within the landraces, which is contrary to the modern hybrid corn varieties, where every plant has the same genetic material. Due to the adaption of modern, high-yielding varieties, which have allowed the world population to grow and evolve during the Green Revolution, landraces have been abandoned and lost in some cases. This has also led to a loss in genetic diversity and genetic material for further breeding. This type of loss is also called as genetic erosion and is also embedded within the UN sustainability goals. In the face of climate change, the adaption of important staple crops, such as corn, rice and wheat, to a changing climate is necessary to feed a growing world population. Finding and conserving landraces all over the world is therefore important for enhancing the genetic pool to breed adapted and robust varieties.

=== Swiss landraces ===
Switzerland has a broad genetic diversity of maize landraces, which are also distinguishable to the genetic pools of neighbouring countries. Technically, the landraces such as the Rheintaler landrace are not separated and independent varieties but a collection or pool of maize plant populations grown in the same region. Genetic analysis from the defined Swiss core collection for maize from Swiss regions with ancient maize production, such as the Ticino, the Rhine valley, Valais, posterior Rhine and the Posciavo valley have shown the geographical diversity of Swiss maize landraces. Furthermore, some region-specific allele were found, also indicating some genetic differences between the regions and thus partly a genetic separation within the Swiss landraces. This means that Swiss maize landraces cannot only be distinguished by the region, where they are grown but also, at least partly, genetically. However, there is also evidence that a strong genetic exchange through trade between the regions has happened. In the case of the “Rheintaler” landrace this exchange is likely to have happened with the adjacent region of the Linth valley but also along the southern parts of the alpine Rhine Valley. Between the northern and the southern landraces as well as the landraces from the Valais, a clearer separation of the genetic pools has been observed. More recent phylogenetic analysis has even identified two northern clusters. Upon these findings, three main groups of Swiss landraces can be distinguished; the northern landraces containing the Rheintaler landrace amongst others, southern landraces and landraces from Valais, which build an intermediate cluster. The genetic differentiation of the Swiss landraces are thus in good accordance with the geographic separation caused by the Swiss Alps.

If the Swiss landraces are put into an international context, the southern Swiss landraces from the Ticino are most similar to the Italian-Orange-Flint pool, whereas northern landraces are closely related to the Northern American flints, which is remarkable considering that corn was first brought to Europe from the American continent in the late 15th century after the exploration of America by the Europeans.

=== The Rheintaler landrace ===
The products of the Rheintaler Ribelmais exclusively use maize produced from the Rheintaler landrace. It belongs to the flint corn variant, which has hard kernels with lower water content and is thus suitable for grinding and milling but not for cob or popcorn production. Many landraces in Switzerland were named after the colour of their cobs (such as weisser Rheintaler). In the Rhine Valley, the cobs often have a light-yellowish colour, but also other colour variants are known, whereas also a small (Kleiner Rheintaler) and big (grosser Rheitnaler) landrace type was defined. The two types differ in the count of the rows (8, 12 or 16) and the size of the corn.

The colour of the cobs varies across the Swiss landraces and can even change over time due to the high diversity within the landraces and the random fertilisation of the open-flowering plants within the field. The sprinkled kernels on the cobs, which can also occur on the cobs of the Rheintaler landrace, were a mystery until American scientist and Nobel Prize winner Barbara McClintock discovered the mechanism of the “jumping genes” transposons in maize, which were responsible for the sprinkled corns.

Because of its white cobs, it is assumed that the white-corn varieties, which can be found south of Venice, may have been introduced to the Rhine Valley and influenced the colour of the cobs by crossing with the original landraces in the Rhine Valley. Through phylogenetic analysis it is today known that the Rheintaler landrace originates from North American flint varieties, which were more suitable to the colder climate in northern and central Europe than the varieties from South America.

== Genetic adaption ==
=== Stress tolerance of landraces ===
Rheintaler Ribelmais is a so-called landrace. A landrace differs in several ways from "normal" races. It is adapted genetically to a certain environment, which can include nutrient-poor soil conditions, traditional agriculture or other cultural practices. Furthermore, it has a higher genetic heterogeneity than a modern hybrid. These traits makes Rheintaler Ribelmais potentially more tolerant to stress. Genetically uniform plant species, such as hybrids have lost their natural resilience: If one plant becomes susceptible to a stress factor, as a consequence all of them will become susceptible.

However, maize is a cross-pollinator. In countries with small scale agriculture, as it is the case in Switzerland, fields are comparatively small. With decreasing numbers of neighbouring plants, as it is the case on small fields, genetic diversity is reduced. This increases the risk of malformations. In recent years, Ribelmais has become more susceptible to pests, which were unproblematic in earlier days. This contradicts the common assumption mentioned before, that landraces are better adapted to local conditions. To ensure trait quality, nowadays Rheintaler Ribelmais needs to be observed and altered by breeding programmes. Modern varieties could therefore be better adapted than traditional landraces.

=== Cold tolerance of Rheintaler Ribelmais ===
Maize is a chilling-sensitive species, as it originates from the tropics. To make maize cultivation possible in Europe, it is planted during late spring. To increase yield, breeding programs mainly select for early maturing maize. Another approach is to breed for increased chilling tolerance. This would make earlier sowing possible and elongate the vegetation period. Consequently, yield would increase. Moreover, seedlings get more competitive against weeds. However, there is no scientific evidence that Rheintaler Ribelmais is more cold tolerant compared to modern hybrids.
