= Anna Barbara Bansi =

French artist (1777–1863)

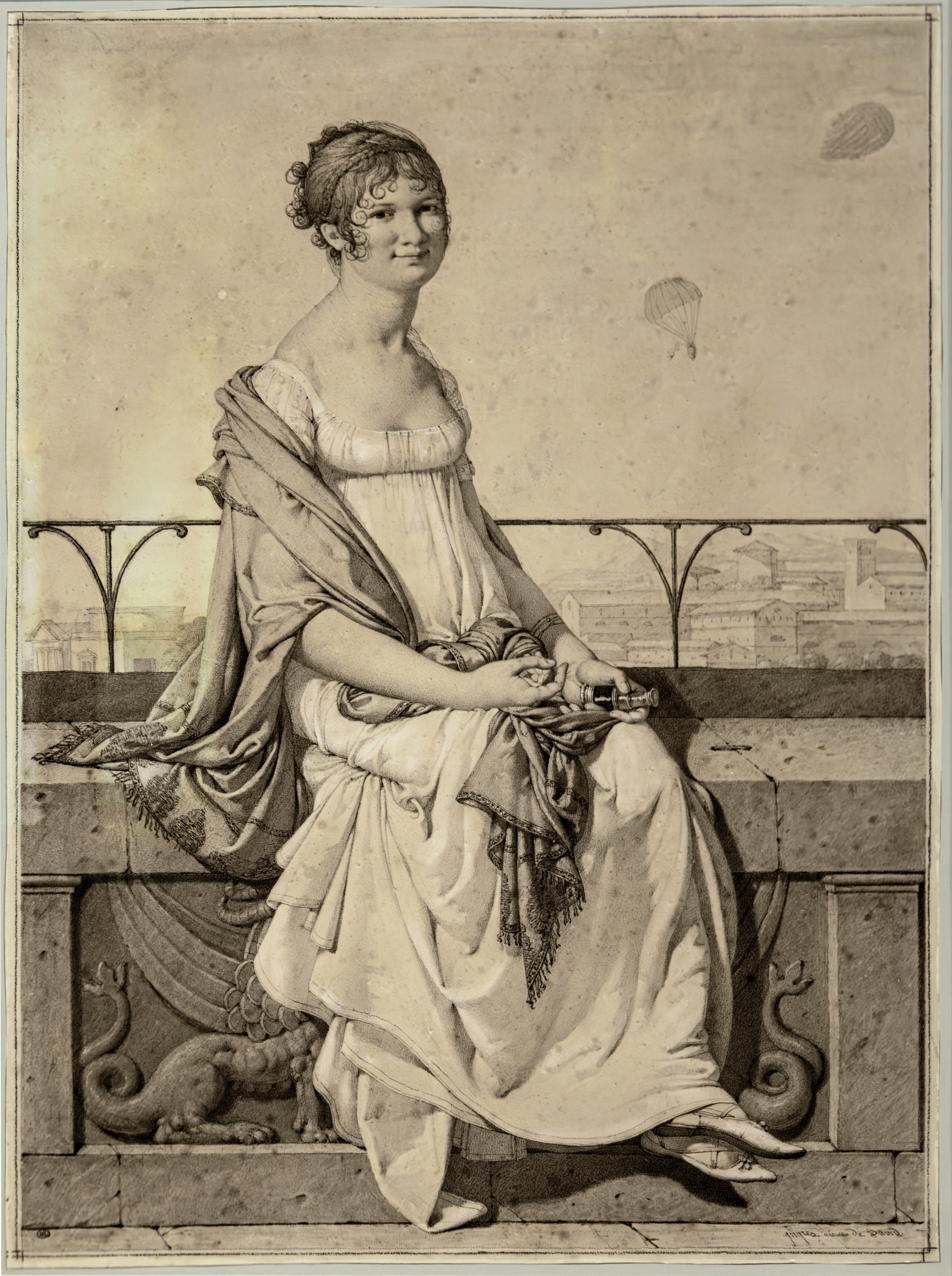
- Portrait of Barbara Bansi by Ingres
- Born: 26 February 1777; Fläsch, Switzerland
- Died: 27 May 1863 (aged 86)
- Known for: Painting

Anna Barbara Bansi (26 February 1777 – 27 May 1863) was a Swiss-born French painter. She is usually referred to as "Barbara" or "Babette".

== Biography ==
Born in Fläsch, Bansi was the daughter of a reformed minister, Heinrich Bansi; her father had little money, and at the age of six she was adopted by Zürich philanthropist Johann Caspar Schweizer, with whom she came to Paris in 1786. He left for the United States in 1794, while she remained behind at school. She studied painting in Paris, exhibiting for the first time in 1798, at the "Salon de Musée". She moved to Italy in 1802 to complete her education, serving also for a while as the companion to Letizia Ramolino and converting to Roman Catholicism while there. During this time Bansi was the subject of a drawing by Jean-Auguste-Dominique Ingres that is today in the Louvre; they had met twice, first in the studio of Jacques-Louis David and some years later in Rome. Furthermore, her only known pastel, which may instead be a drawing in black chalk, is of the violinist Pierre Baillot, also drawn by Ingres.

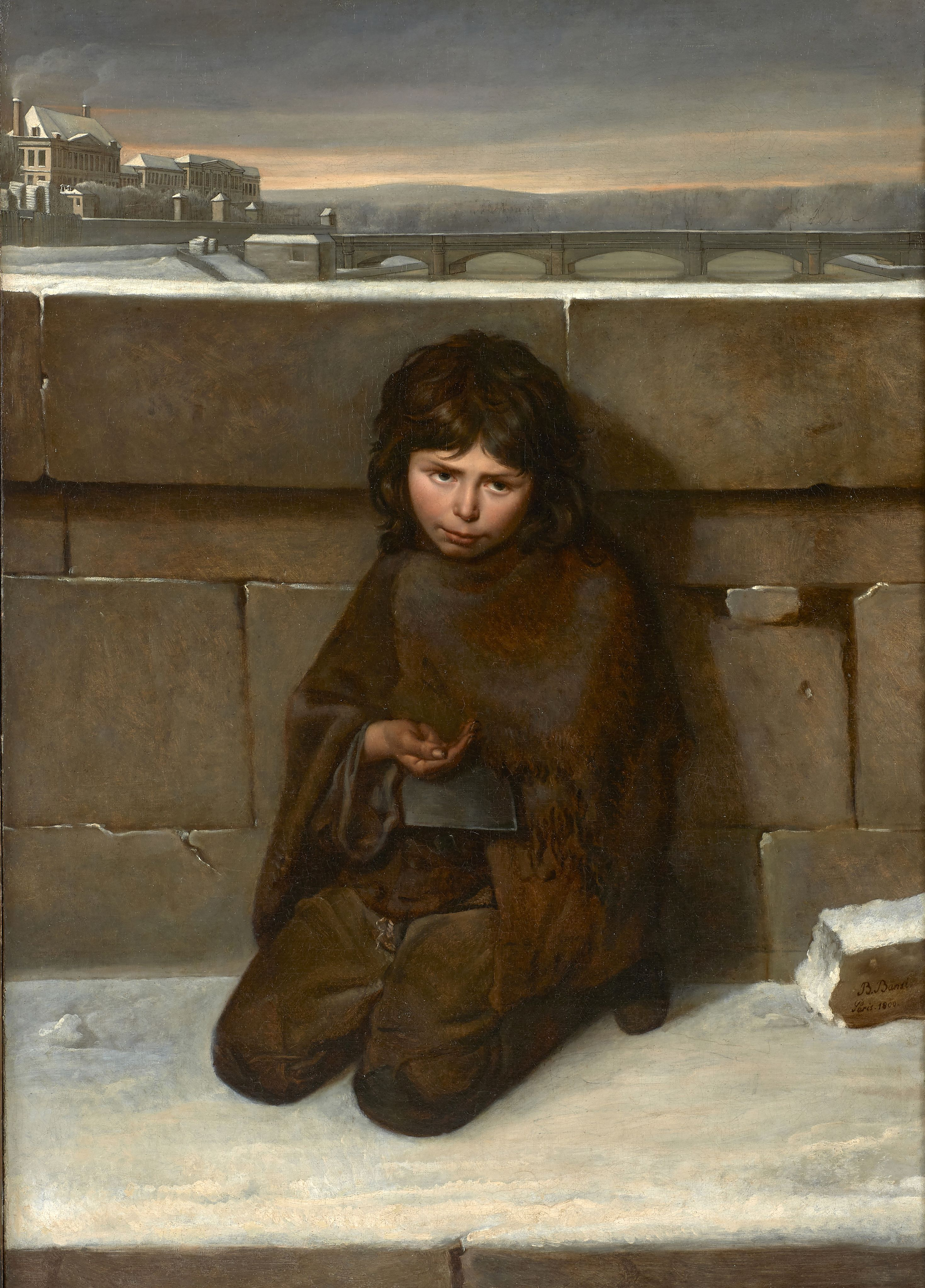
Barbara Bansi, Young beggar near the Seine, 1800

It has been claimed that Bansi had an affair with Joseph-Benoît Suvée, of whom she was a pupil. In 1808 she married Lorenzo Nannoni, a physician; he died in 1812, and two years later she returned to Paris, exhibiting an oil painting of the Virgin at that year's salon. Her name in the catalogue entry was given as Mme Nannoni, née Bansi, with an address at rue du Doyenné, no. 3. Later in her career Bansi was appointed maîtresse de dessin at the schools of Saint-Denis and Sainte-Clotilde. She donated two pastels by Adélaïde Labille-Guiard, portraits of Jean-Jacques Bachelier and the painter Vincent, to the Louvre in 1832. Several works by Bansi, including a 1793 self-portrait, are known, and a fragmentary diary from the same year survives as well.
