= Neu-Aspermont Castle =

Ruined castle in Switzerland

- Burg Neu-Aspermont
- Jenins
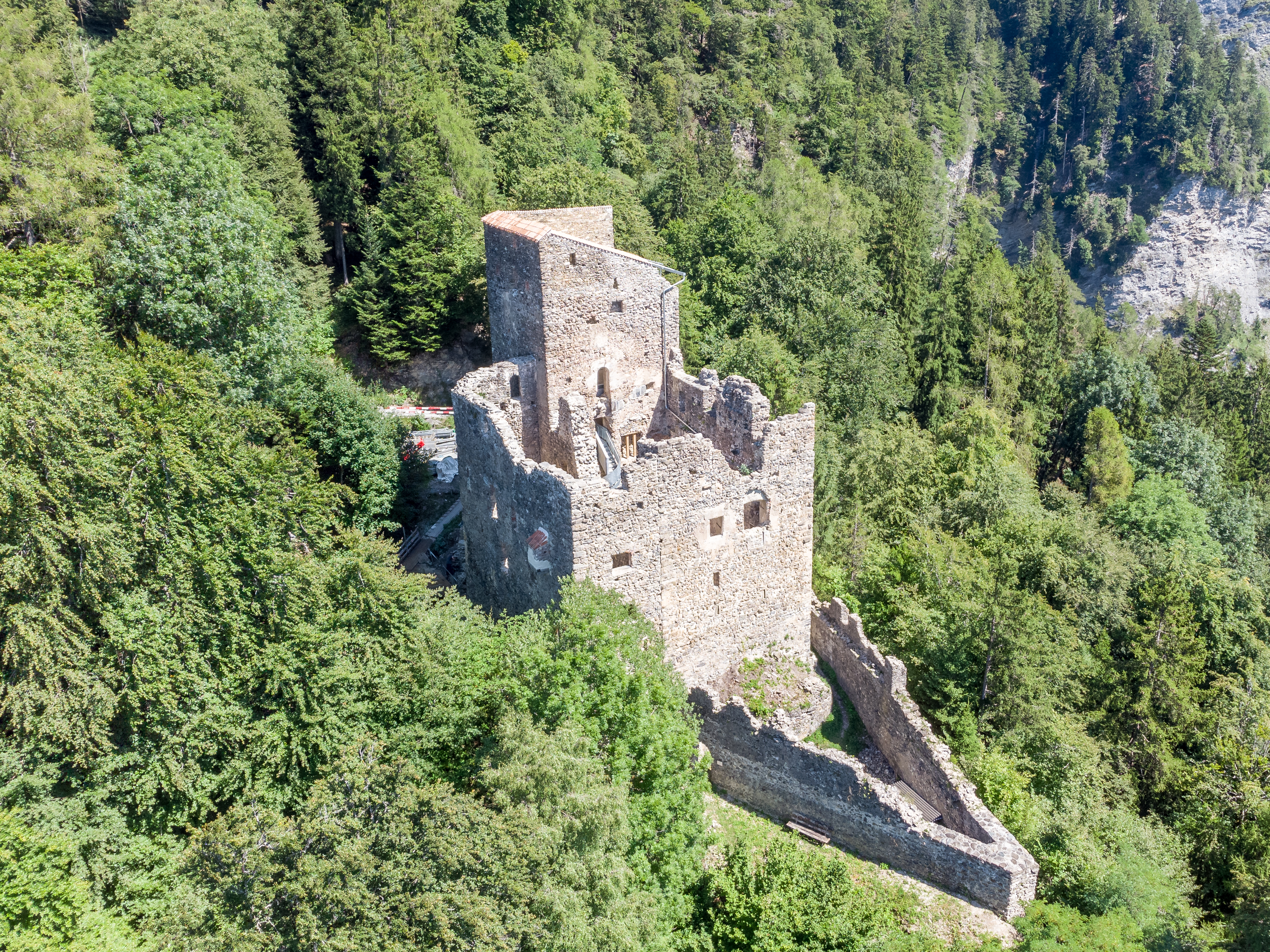
- Neu-Aspermont Castle seen from southwest

Site information
- Owner: Canton of Graubünden
- Open to the public: yes
- Condition: ruined

Location
- Coordinates: 47.003243°N 9.565202°E

Site history
- Built: c. 1235
- Built by: Lords of Aspermont
- Materials: stone

Swiss Cultural Property of National Significance

Neu-Aspermont Castle is a ruined castle in the municipality of Jenins in the Canton of Graubünden in Switzerland. It is a Swiss heritage site of national significance.

== Castle site ==
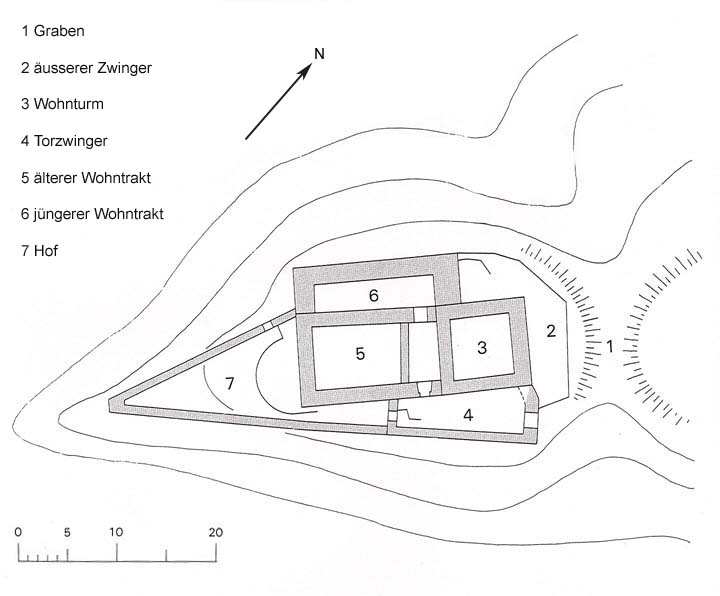
Plan of Neu-Aspermont

The castle is built on a rocky spur above the village of Jenins. It is separated from the mountain side by a dry moat. South-west of the moat is a large, square tower, six or seven stories high. The original high entrance was on the third floor of the south-west side. After the castle was partly destroyed in 1499, the upper stories were either rebuilt or added. Keyhole and square windows mark the early 16th century construction. Baroque frescoes in black and white are still visible on the walls. South-west of the tower is the remains of the medieval residential tract or palas along with additional housing which was probably added in the 16th century. A wall enclosed the southern end of the spur, forming a courtyard behind the palas. East of the tower was the gatehouse and wall that ran along the dry moat.

== Gallery ==
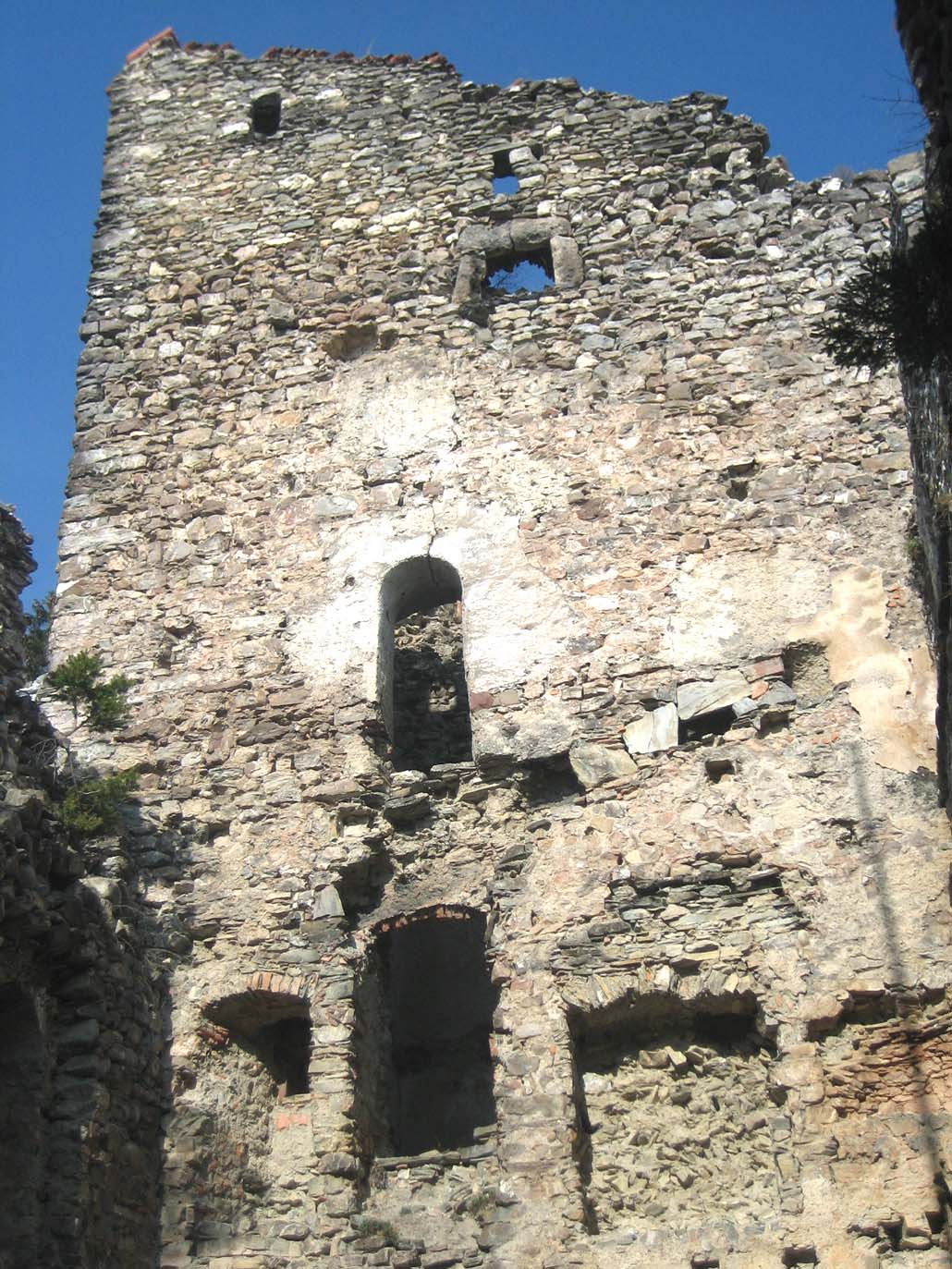
Southwest side of the tower

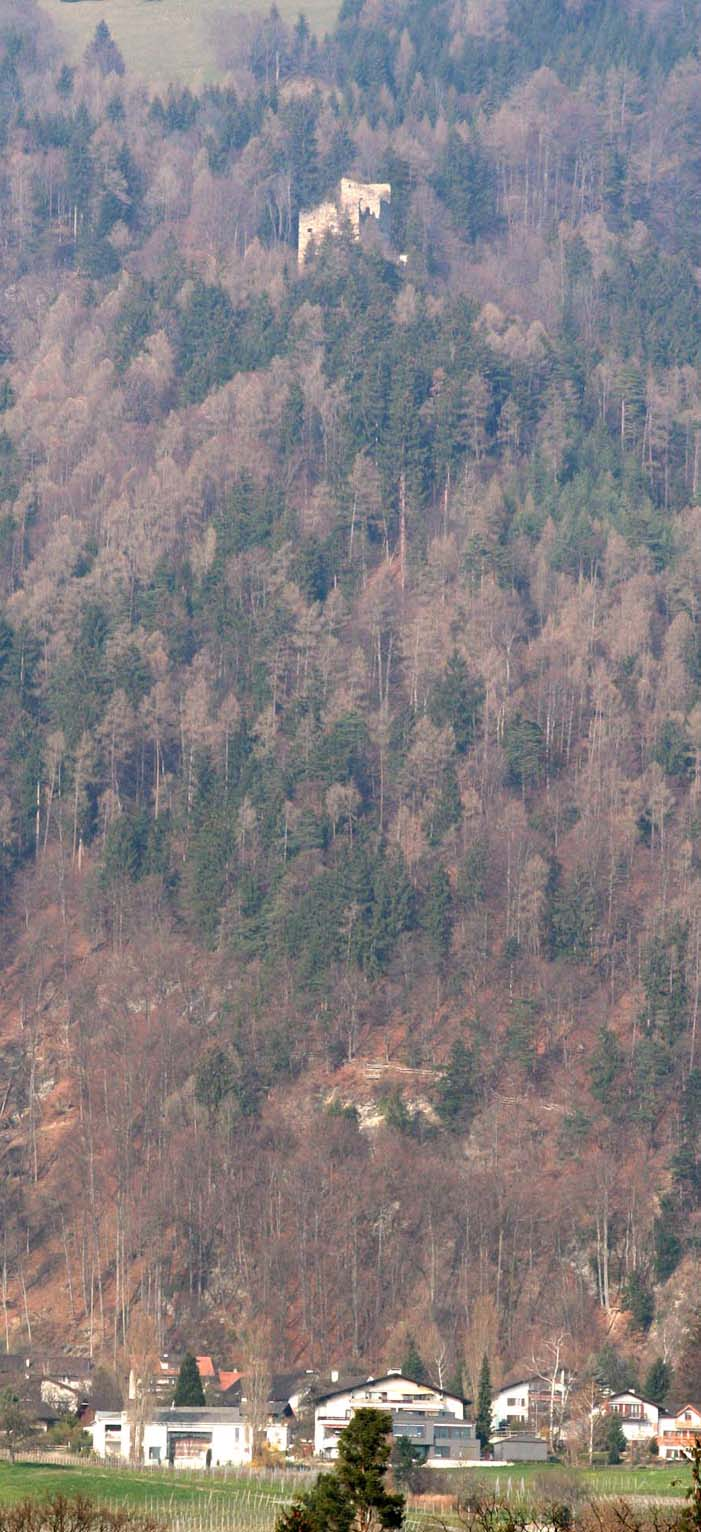
Neu-Aspermont above the village of Jenins

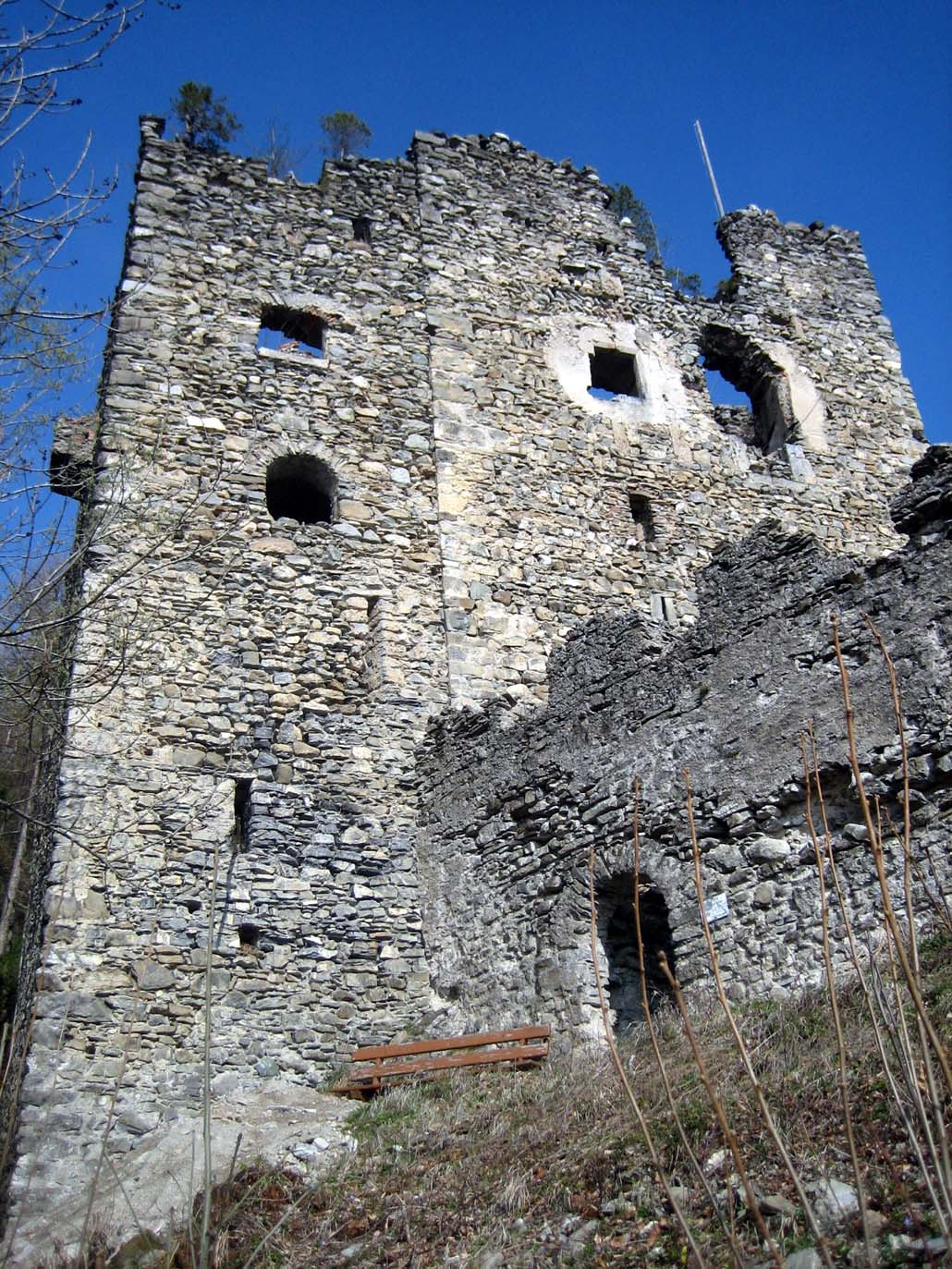
Old and new parts of the palas, new on the left

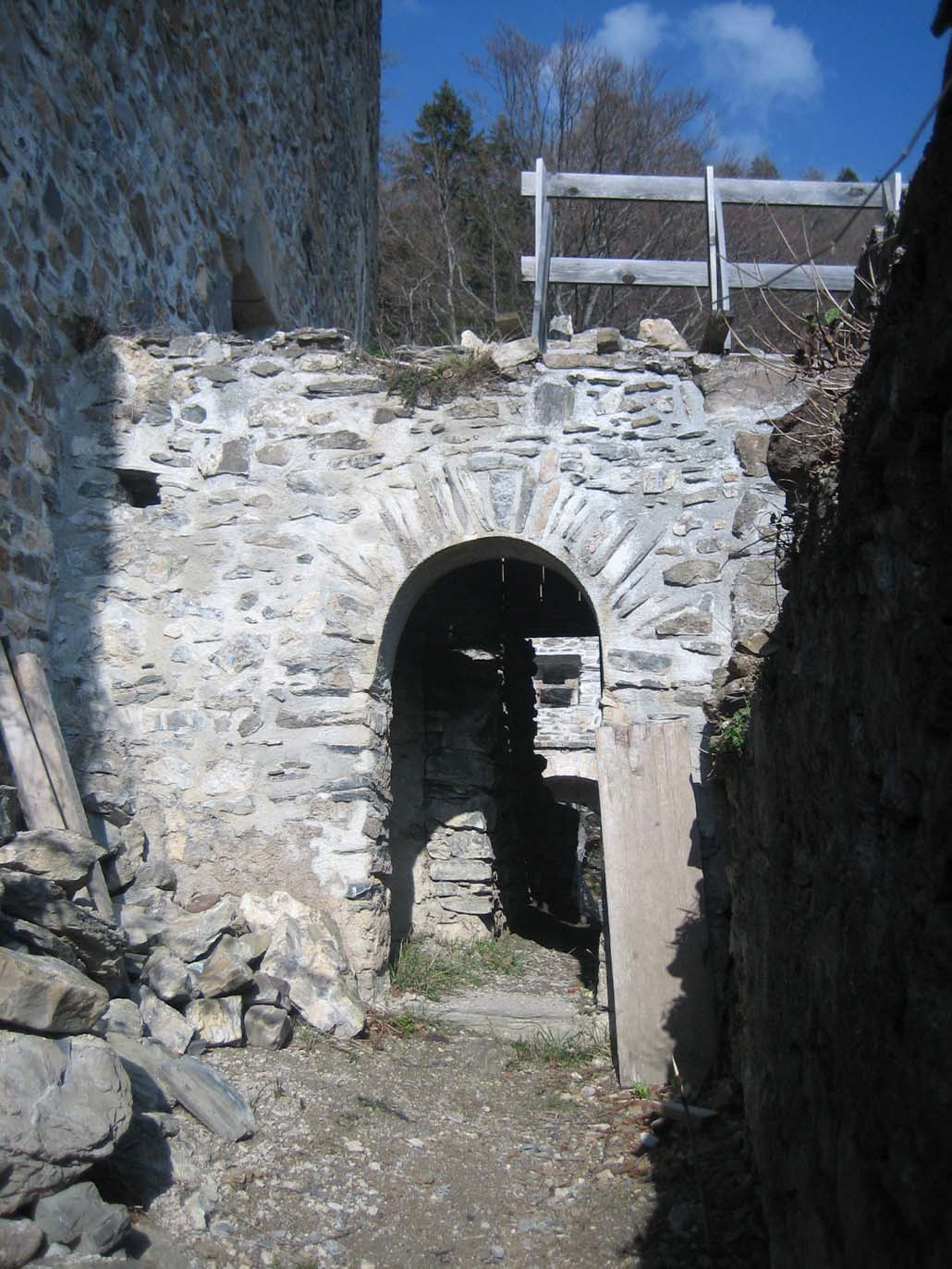
Gate to the bailey

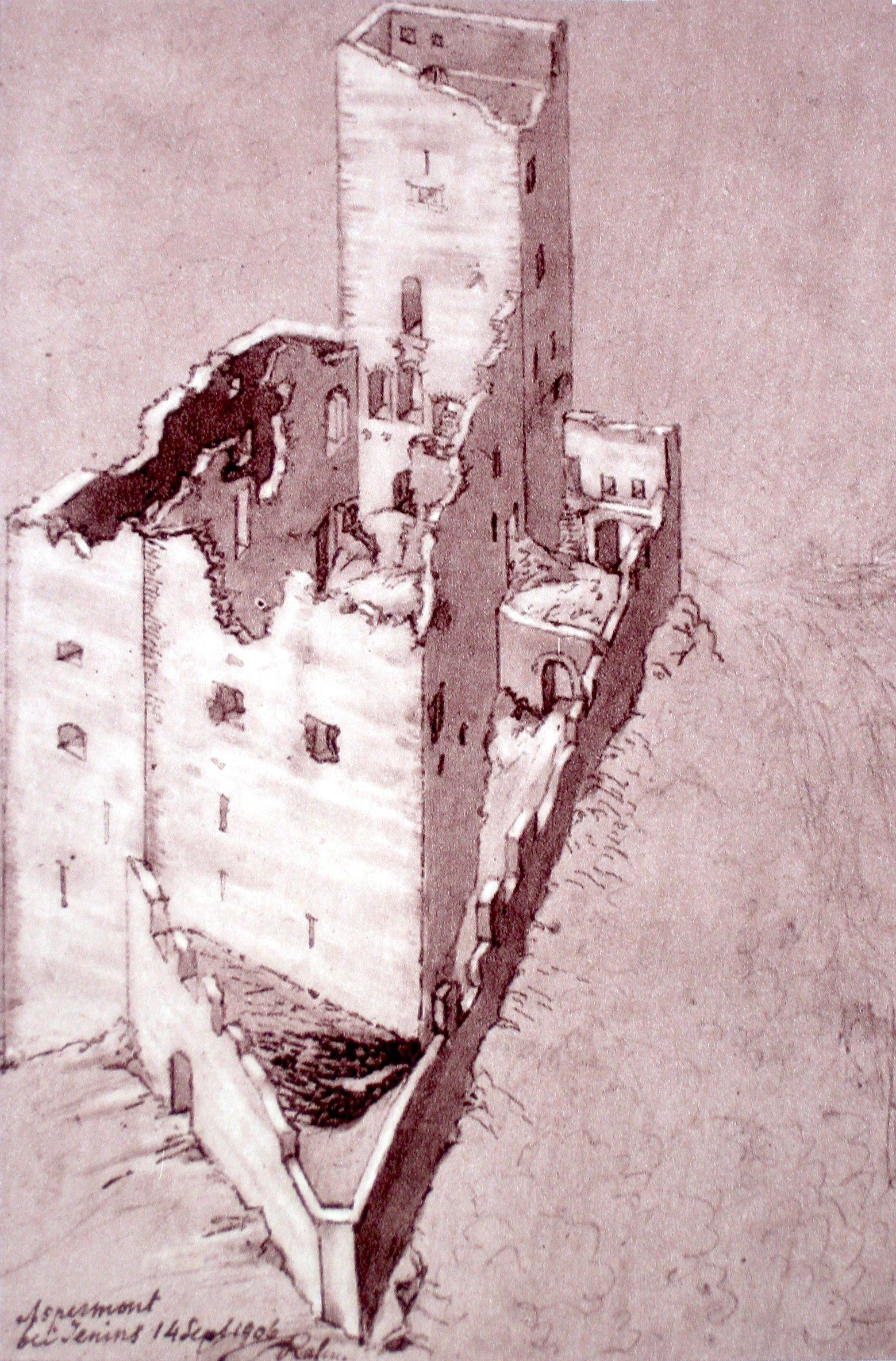
View of the castle in 1906

== See also ==
- List of castles in Switzerland
