= Fläscherberg =

Mountain in Switzerland

- Regitzer Spitz
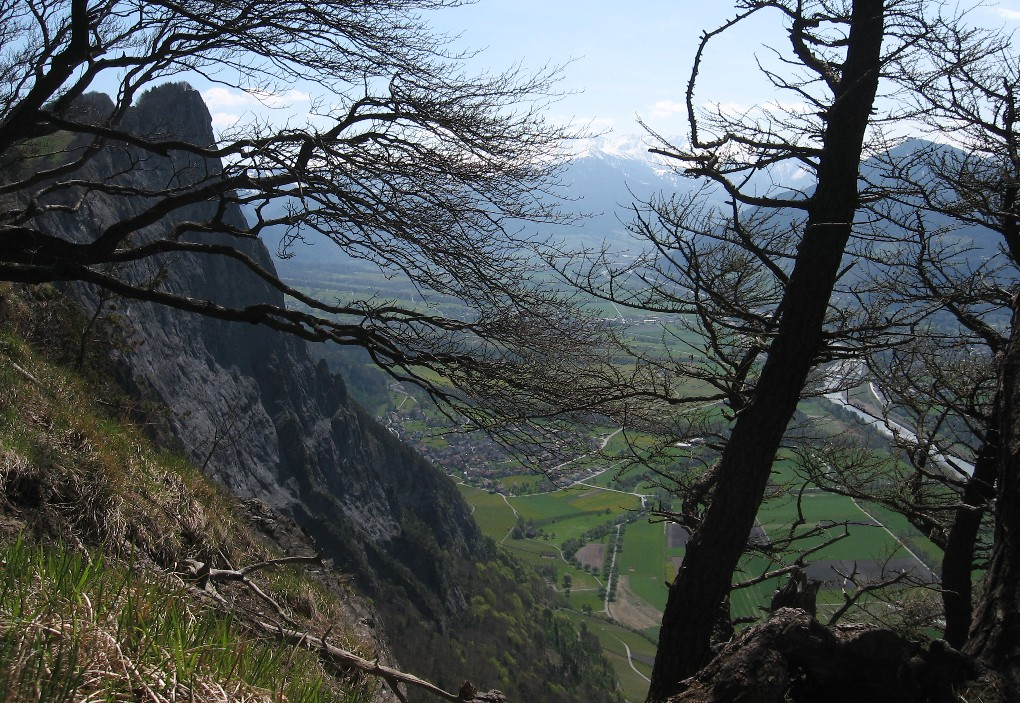
- View from near the summit

Highest point
- Elevation: 1,135 m (3,724 ft)
- Prominence: 422 m (1,385 ft)
- Coordinates: 47°02′15″N 9°30′23″E

Geography
- Location within Switzerland
- Location: Graubünden, Switzerland
- Parent range: Rätikon

The Fläscherberg (also known as Regitzer Spitz) is a mountain of the Rätikon, overlooking the Rhine in the Swiss canton of Graubünden. The closest locality is Fläsch on the southern side of the mountain.

At the northern foot of the mountain is the border with Liechtenstein, and the town of Balzers.
