= Landquart Region =

Coordinates: 46°58′N 9°33′E

Landquart Region Region Landquart (German)
- District
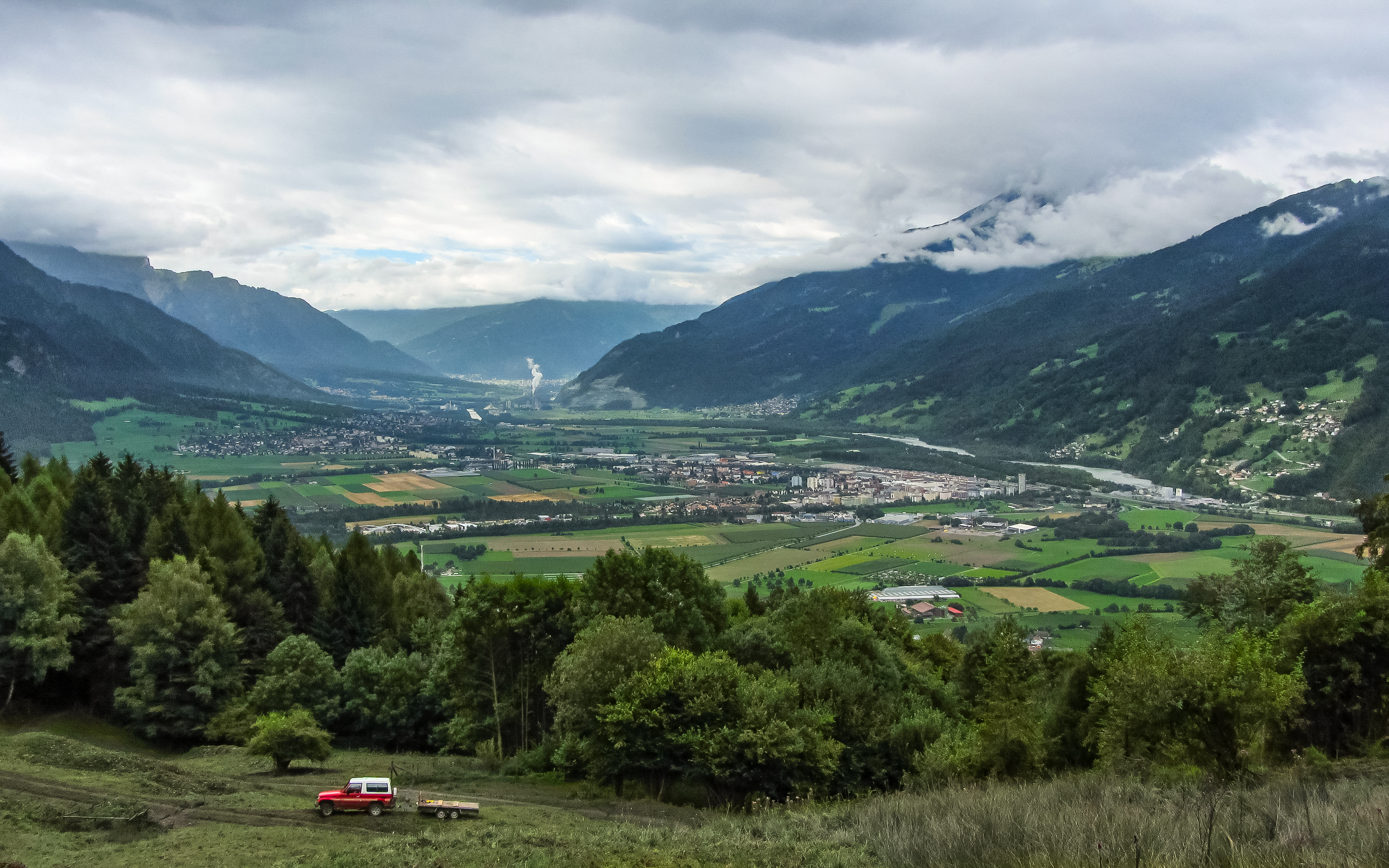
- View of Landquart Region from a hayfield in Malans
- Country: Switzerland
- Canton: Graubünden

Area
  - Total: 174.67 km^{2} (67.44 sq mi)

Population (2020)
  - Total: 25,463
  - Density: 145.78/km^{2} (377.56/sq mi)
- Time zone: UTC+1 (CET)
  - Summer (DST): UTC+2 (CEST)
- Municipalities: 8

Landquart Region is one of the eleven administrative districts in the canton of Graubünden in Switzerland. It had an area of 174.67 square kilometers (67.44 sq mi) and a population of 25,463 (as of 31 December 2020). It was created on 1 January 2017 as part of a reorganization of the Canton.

Municipalities in the Landquart Region
Municipality	Population (31 December 2020)	Area (km^{2})
Trimmis	3,322	42.87
Untervaz	2,527	27.72
Zizers	3,520	11.01
Fläsch	831	19.94
Jenins	915	10.54
Maienfeld	3,029	32.33
Malans	2,462	11.4
Landquart	8,857	18.86
