= Fläsch =

- Municipality
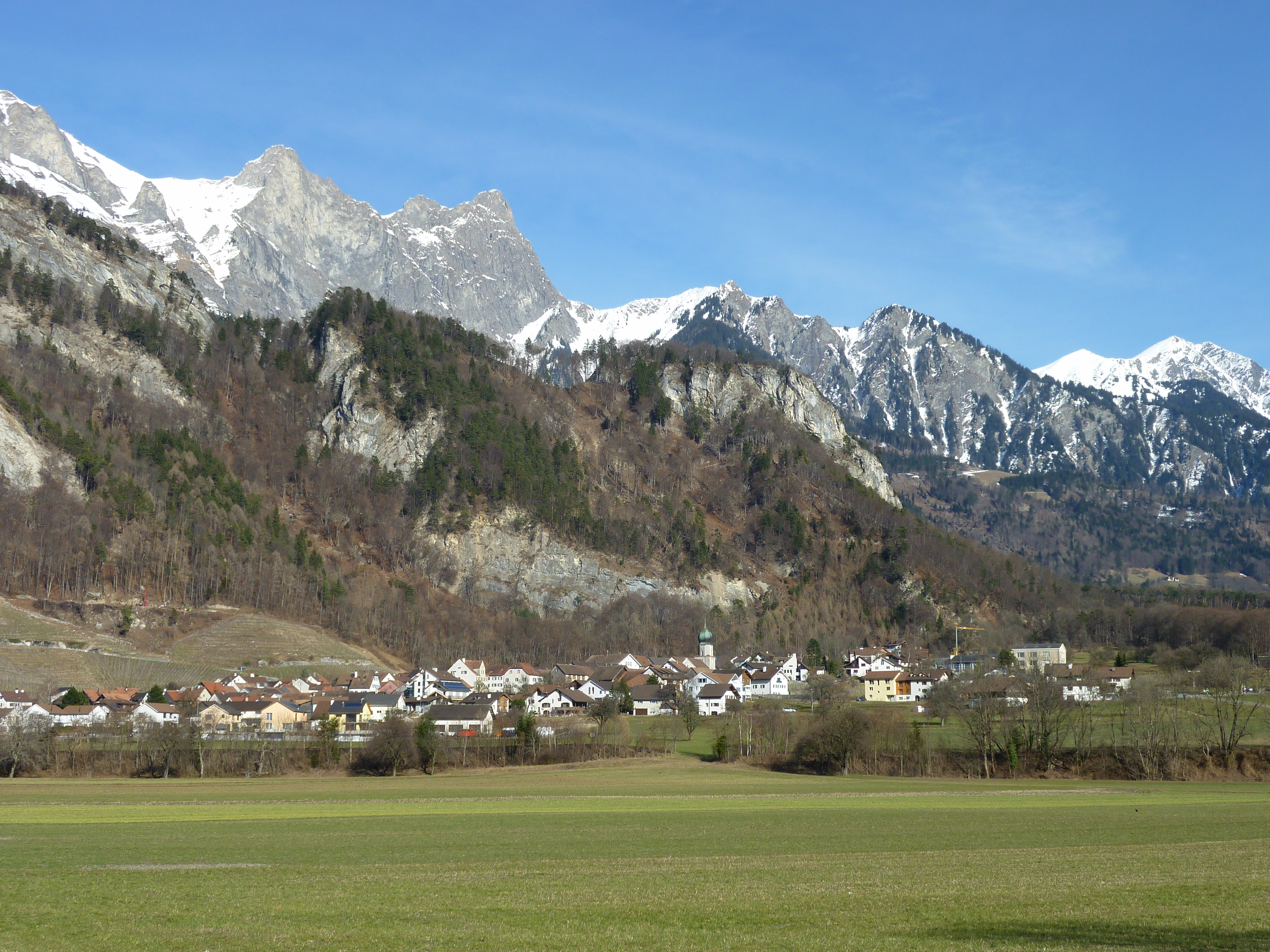

- Flag Coat of arms
- Location of Fläsch
- Location within Switzerland Location within Canton of Grisons
- Coordinates: 47°1′N 9°30′E
- Country: Switzerland
- Canton: Grisons
- District: Landquart

Government
  - Mayor: Heinz Urs Kunz

Area
  - Total: 19.94 km^{2} (7.70 sq mi)
- Elevation: 528 m (1,732 ft)
- Highest elevation (Grauspitz): 2,599 m (8,527 ft)

Population (December 2020)
  - Total: 831
  - Density: 41.7/km^{2} (108/sq mi)
- Time zone: UTC+01:00 (CET)
  - Summer (DST): UTC+02:00 (CEST)
- Postal code: 7306
- SFOS number: 3951
- ISO 3166 code: CH-GR
- Surrounded by: Bad Ragaz (SG), Balzers (LI), Maienfeld, Mels (SG), Sargans (SG), Triesen (LI), Vilters-Wangs (SG)
- Website: www.flaesch.ch

Fläsch is a municipality in the Landquart Region in the Swiss canton of the Grisons.

== History ==
Fläsch is first mentioned in 831 as Villa Flasce. Painter Anna Barbara Bansi was a native of the town.

In 1949, the Ellhorn mountain owned by the Balzers municipality in Liechtenstein was ceded to Switzerland and became a part of Fläsch in exchange for the territory on the neighboring Mälsner Allmein mountain and Fläscher Riet marsh.

== Geography ==
Fläsch has an area, as of 2006, of 20 km^{2} (7.7 sq mi). Of this area, 35.3% is used for agricultural purposes, while 43.8% is forested. Of the rest of the land, 2% is settled (buildings or roads) and the remainder (18.8%) is non-productive (rivers, glaciers or mountains).

Before 2017, the municipality was located in the Maienfeld sub-district of the Landquart district, after 2017 it was part of the Landquart Region. It is the most northerly municipality in the canton of the Grisons. Fläsch is located at the foot of the Fläscherberg and St. Luzisteig mountains.

== Demographics ==
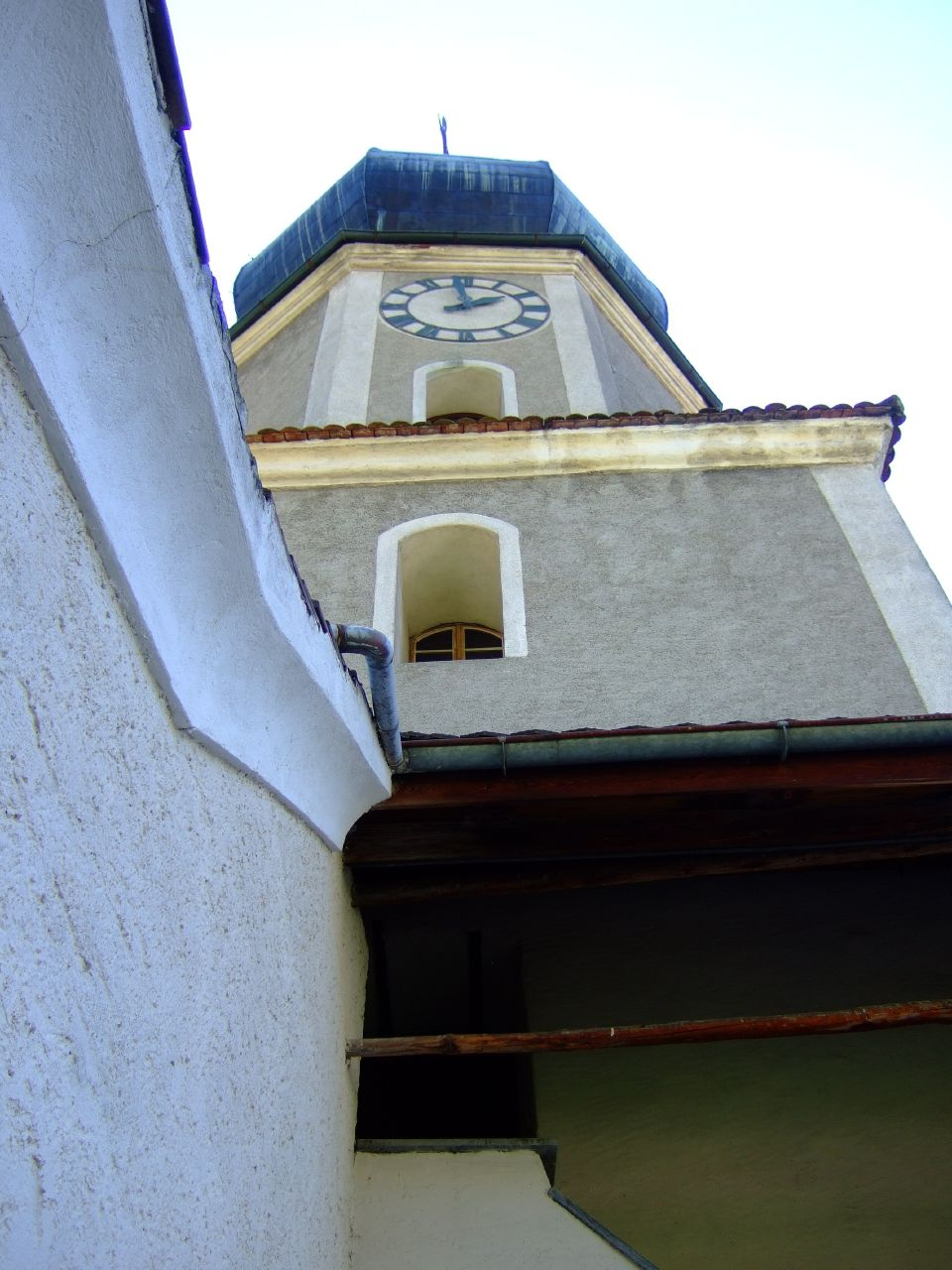
Village church of Fläsch

Fläsch has a population (as of 31 December 2020) of 831. As of 2008, 4.6% of the population was made up of foreign nationals. Over the last 10 years the population has grown at a rate of 9.2%.

As of 2000, the gender distribution of the population was 50.3% male and 49.7% female. The age distribution, as of 2000, in Fläsch is; 79 children or 14.8% of the population are between 0 and 9 years old. 37 teenagers or 6.9% are 10 to 14, and 29 teenagers or 5.4% are 15 to 19. Of the adult population, 44 people or 8.2% of the population are between 20 and 29 years old. 121 people or 22.6% are 30 to 39, 83 people or 15.5% are 40 to 49, and 63 people or 11.8% are 50 to 59. The senior population distribution is 43 people or 8.0% of the population are between 60 and 69 years old, 21 people or 3.9% are 70 to 79, there are 11 people or 2.1% who are 80 to 89, and there are 4 people or 0.7% who are 90 to 99.

In the 2007 federal election the most popular party was the SVP which received 36.5% of the vote. The next three most popular parties were the FDP (26.2%), the SP (24.7%) and the CVP (9.3%).

The entire Swiss population is generally well educated. In Fläsch about 83.5% of the population (between age 25-64) have completed either non-mandatory upper secondary education or additional higher education (either university or a Fachhochschule).

Fläsch has an unemployment rate of 0.28%. As of 2005, there were 87 people employed in the primary economic sector and about 23 businesses involved in this sector. 5 people are employed in the secondary sector and there are 4 businesses in this sector. 43 people are employed in the tertiary sector, with 13 businesses in this sector.

The historical population is given in the following table:

year	population
1850	441
1900	383
1950	393
1970	317
2000	535

== Languages ==
Most of the population (as of 2000) speaks German (97.0%), with Portuguese being second most common (1.3%) and Romansh being third (0.7%). While the village was Romansh speaking in the Early Middle Ages, by the 14th Century Alemanni immigrants had Germanized the valley.

Languages in Fläsch
Languages	Census 1980		Census 1990		Census 2000	
Languages	Number	Percent	Number	Percent	Number	Percent
German	339	97.41%	400	96.39%	519	97.01%
Romansh	5	1.44%	2	0.48%	4	0.75%
Population	348	100%	415	100%	535	100%

== Heritage sites of national significance ==
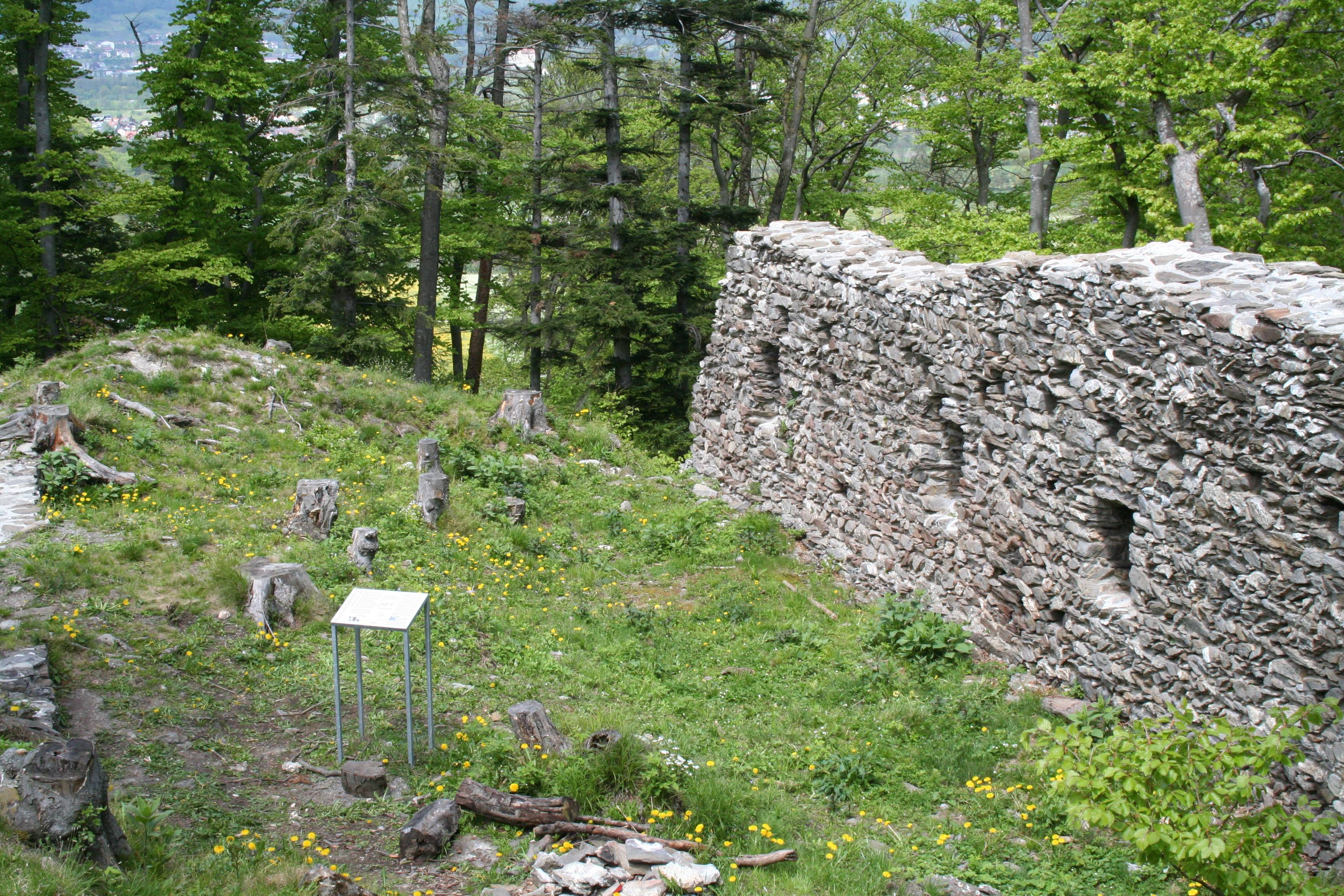
Ruins of Letzi Grafenberg, from the north

The Festung Luziensteig, the Kleine Schanze fortifications and watch tower Letzi Grafenberg are listed as Swiss heritage sites of national significance.
