= Malans, Switzerland =

Malans
- Municipality
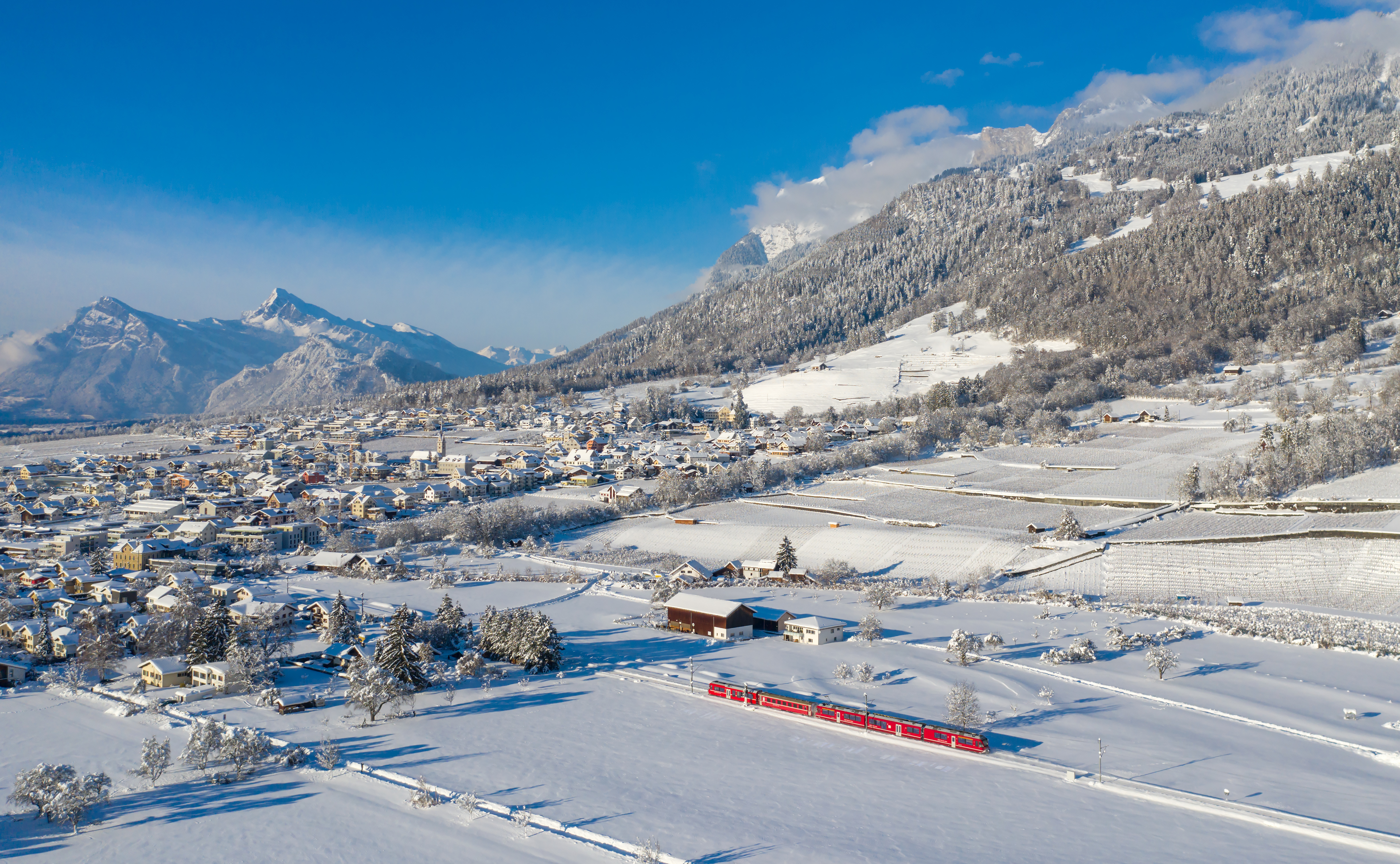

- Flag Coat of arms
- Location of Malans
- Location within Switzerland Location within Canton of Grisons
- Coordinates: 46°58′N 9°34′E
- Country: Switzerland
- Canton: Grisons
- District: Landquart

Government
  - Mayor: Guido Anesini

Area
  - Total: 11.40 km^{2} (4.40 sq mi)
- Elevation: 568 m (1,864 ft)

Population (December 2020)
  - Total: 2,462
  - Density: 216.0/km^{2} (559.3/sq mi)
- Time zone: UTC+01:00 (CET)
  - Summer (DST): UTC+02:00 (CEST)
- Postal code: 7208
- SFOS number: 3954
- ISO 3166 code: CH-GR
- Surrounded by: Igis, Jenins, Maienfeld, Seewis im Prättigau, Valzeina
- Website: www.malans.ch

Malans is a municipality in the Landquart Region in the Swiss canton of the Grisons.

== History ==
Malans is first mentioned about 840 as in villa Mellanze. In 956 it was mentioned as Malanz.

== Heritage sites of national significance ==
The Rohan-Schanze archeological site and Bothmar Castle with its surrounding buildings and park are listed as Swiss heritage sites of national significance.

== Geography ==
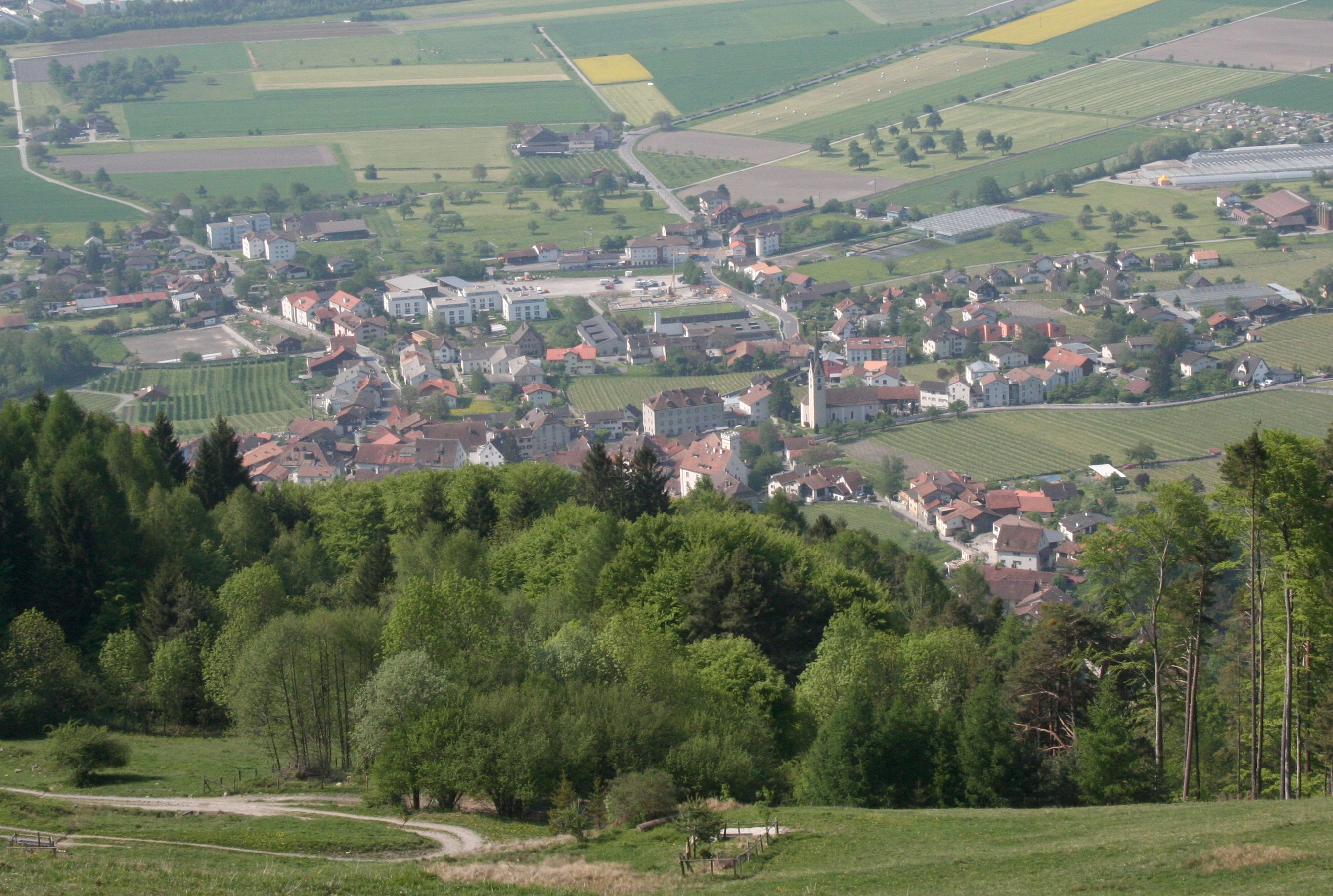
Malans village

Malans has an area, as of 2006, of 11.4 km^{2} (4.4 sq mi). Of this area, 39.5% is used for agricultural purposes, while 44.4% is forested. Of the rest of the land, 6.9% is settled (buildings or roads) and the remainder (9.2%) is non-productive (rivers, glaciers or mountains).

The municipality is the capital of the Maienfeld sub-district of the Landquart district, after 2017 it was part of the Landquart Region. It lies along the old Rhine valley road and the road over the Fadärastein pass into the Prättigau valley.

== Demographics ==
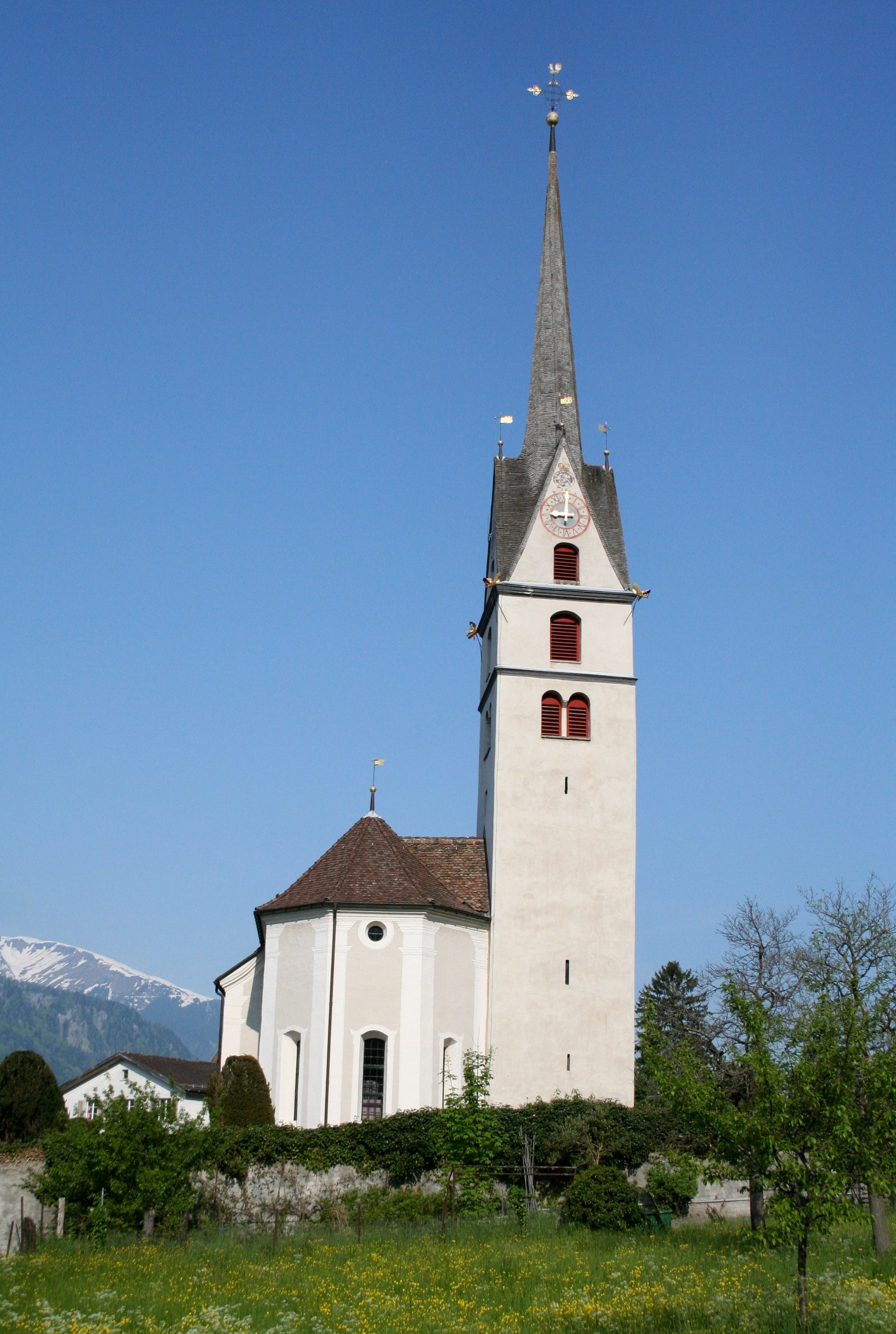
Malans village church

Malans has a population (as of 31 December 2020) of 2,462. The historical population is as follows:

year	population
2000	1,908
1950	1,345
1900	873
1880	838
1850	912

As of 2008, 7.7% of the population was made up of foreign nationals.

As of 2000:

- most of the population speaks Swiss German (94.9%), with Romansh being second most common (1.3%) and Swiss Italian being third (0.9%).
- the gender distribution was 49.3% male and 50.7% female.
- the age distribution was as follows:

Age group	Population	% of total
Children (0-9yrs)	281	14.7%
Pre-teen (10-14yrs)	127	6.7%
Teenagers (15-19yrs)	106	5.6%
Adults (20-29yrs)	187	9.8%
Adults (30-39yrs)	391	20.5%
Adults (40-49yrs)	248	13.0%
Adults (50-59yrs)	229	12.0%
Seniors (60-69yrs)	146	7.7%
Seniors (70-79yrs)	140	7.3%
Seniors (80-89yrs)	42	2.2%
Seniors (90-99yrs)	11	0.6%

=== Religion ===
From the 2000 census, 528 or 27.7% are Roman Catholic, while 1,137 or 59.6% belonged to the Swiss Reformed Church. Of the rest of the population, there are 20 individuals (or about 1.05% of the population) who belong to the Orthodox Church, and there are 18 individuals (or about 0.94% of the population) who belong to another Christian church. There are 16 (or about 0.84% of the population) who are Islamic. There are 8 individuals (or about 0.42% of the population) who belong to another church (not listed on the census), 131 (or about 6.87% of the population) belong to no church, are agnostic or atheist, and 50 individuals (or about 2.62% of the population) did not answer the question.

=== Education ===
The entire Swiss population is generally well educated. In Malans about 83.8% of the population (between age 25-64) have completed either non-mandatory upper secondary education or additional higher education (either university or a Fachhochschule).

=== Politics ===
In the 2007 federal election the most popular party was the SVP which received 35% of the vote. The next three most popular parties were the SP (31.2%), the FDP (24.9%) and the CVP (7.5%).

== Economy ==
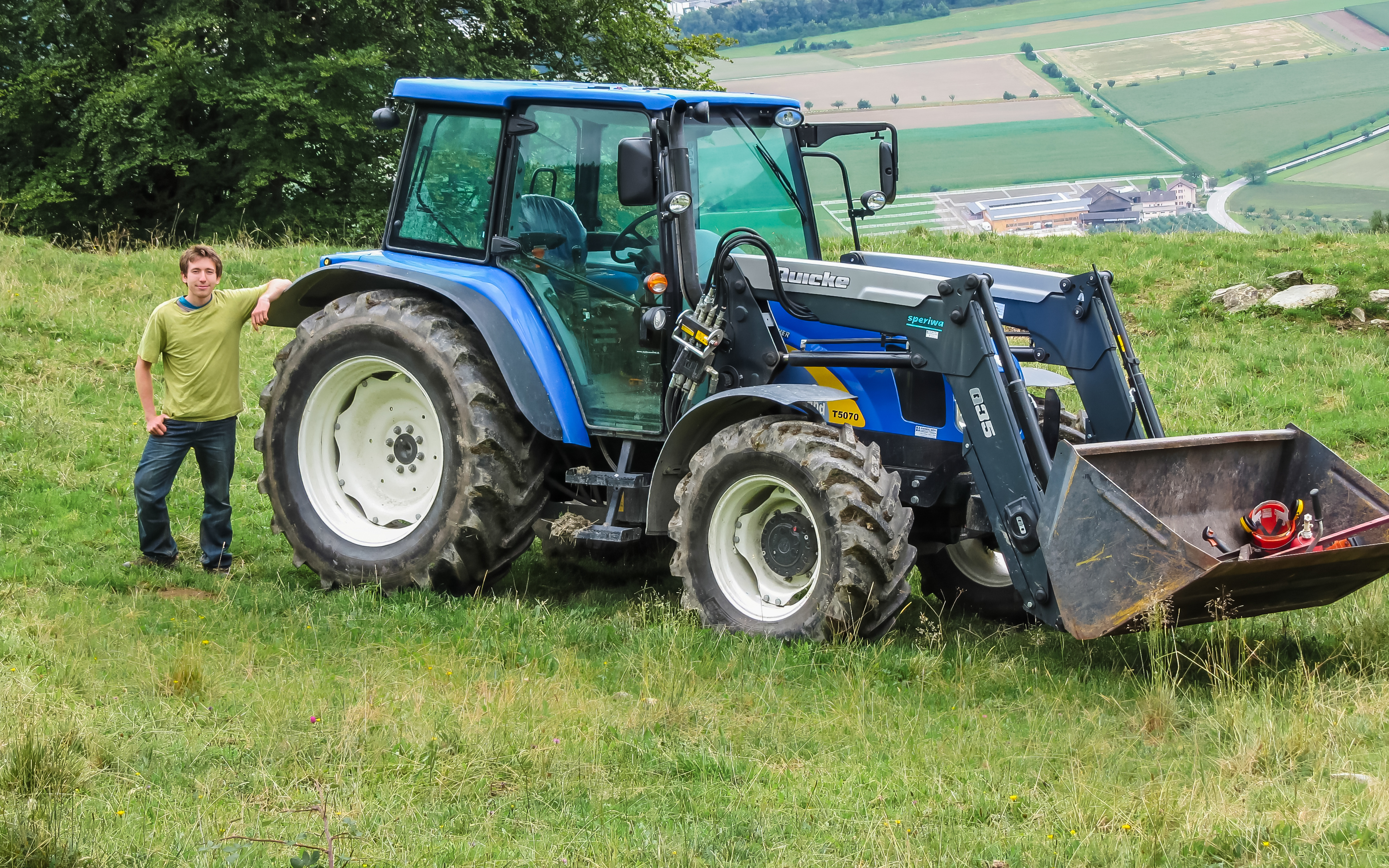
Farmer with a New Holland tractor on a hayfield in Malans

As of 2005, Malans has an unemployment rate of 0.89%. Employment and businesses were organized as follows:

Sector	People Employed	Businesses Involved
Primary (raw materials)	166	41
Secondary (manufacturing)	140	26
Tertiary (service)	286	68

== Transportation ==
The municipality has a railway station, Malans, on the Landquart–Davos Platz line. It has regular service to Disentis/Mustér, Scuol-Tarasp, Rhäzüns, and Schiers.

== Gallery ==
Aerial view (1949)

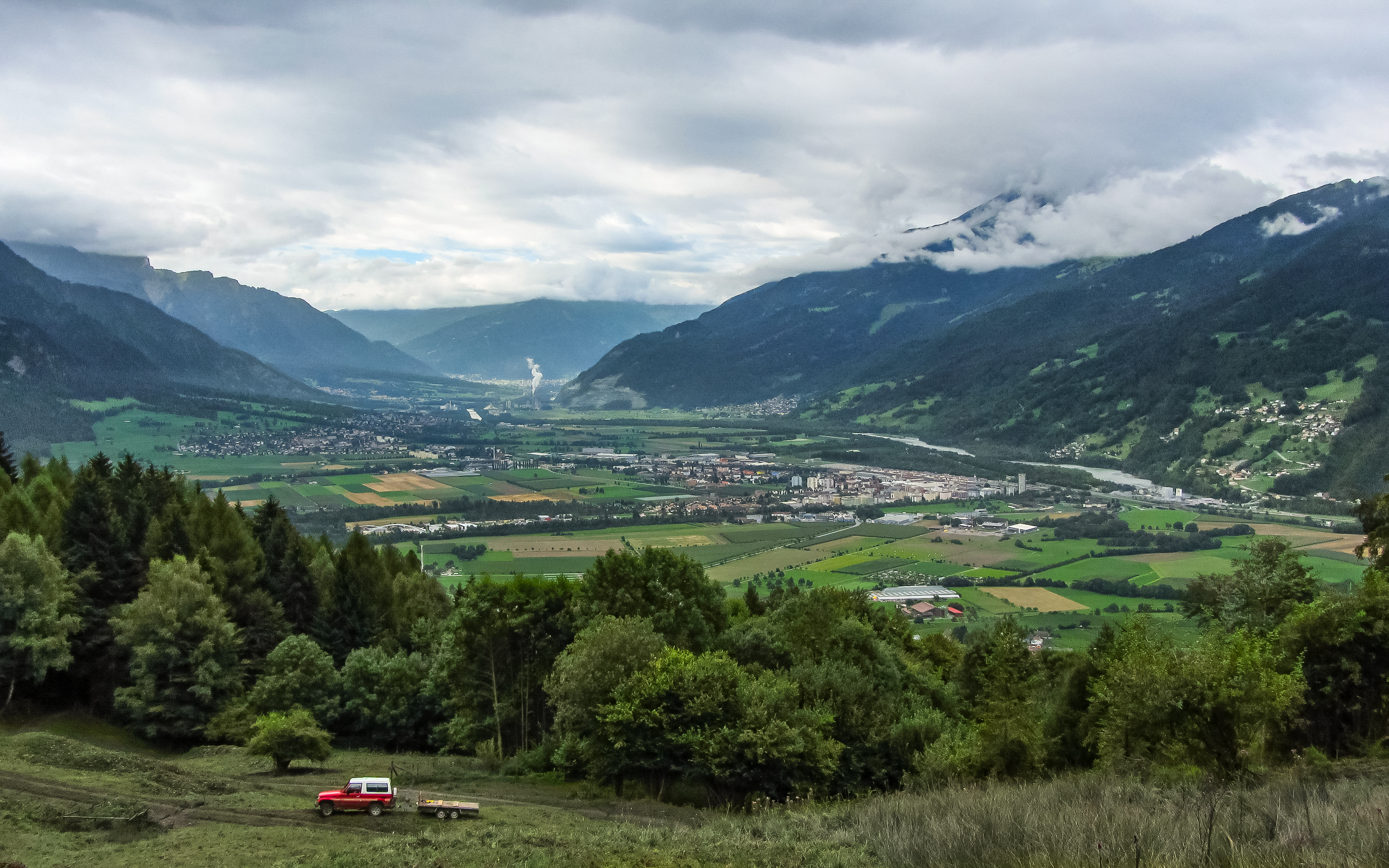
Landquart Region as seen from a hayfield in Malans
