= Jenins =

- Municipality
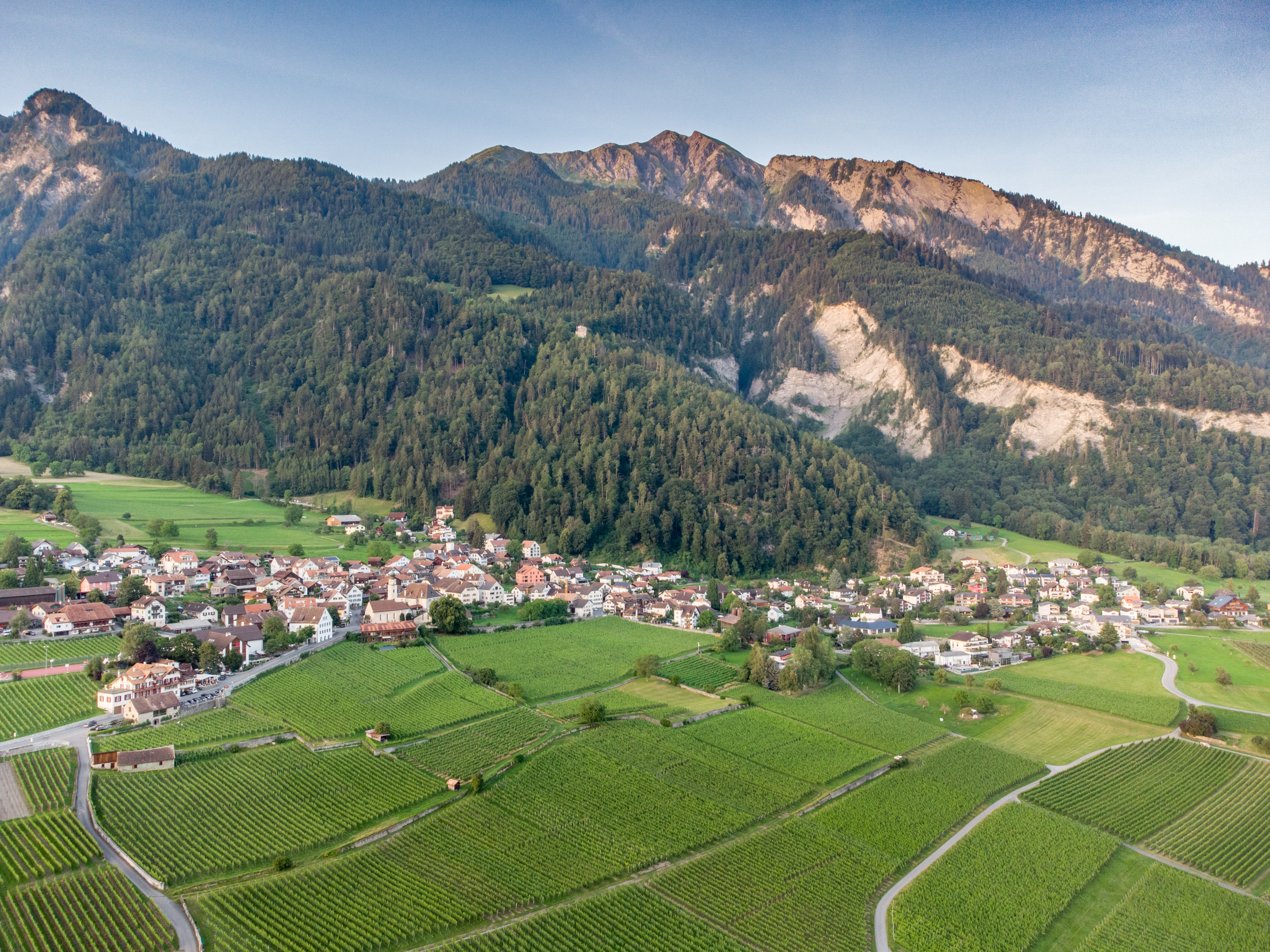

- Flag Coat of arms
- Location of Jenins
- Location within Switzerland Location within Canton of Grisons
- Coordinates: 47°0′N 9°33′E
- Country: Switzerland
- Canton: Grisons
- District: Landquart

Government
  - Mayor: Gemeindepräsident; Baseli Werth (as of 2014)

Area
  - Total: 10.54 km^{2} (4.07 sq mi)
- Elevation: 635 m (2,083 ft)
- Highest elevation (Vilan): 2,376 m (7,795 ft)

Population (December 2020)
  - Total: 915
  - Density: 86.8/km^{2} (225/sq mi)
- Time zone: UTC+01:00 (CET)
  - Summer (DST): UTC+02:00 (CEST)
- Postal code: 7307
- SFOS number: 3952
- ISO 3166 code: CH-GR
- Surrounded by: Maienfeld, Malans, Seewis im Prättigau
- Website: www.jenins.ch

Jenins (Romansh: Gianin) is a municipality in the Landquart Region in the Swiss canton of the Grisons.

== History ==
Jenins is first mentioned in 1139 as Uienennes. In 1142 it was mentioned as Gininnes.

== Geography ==
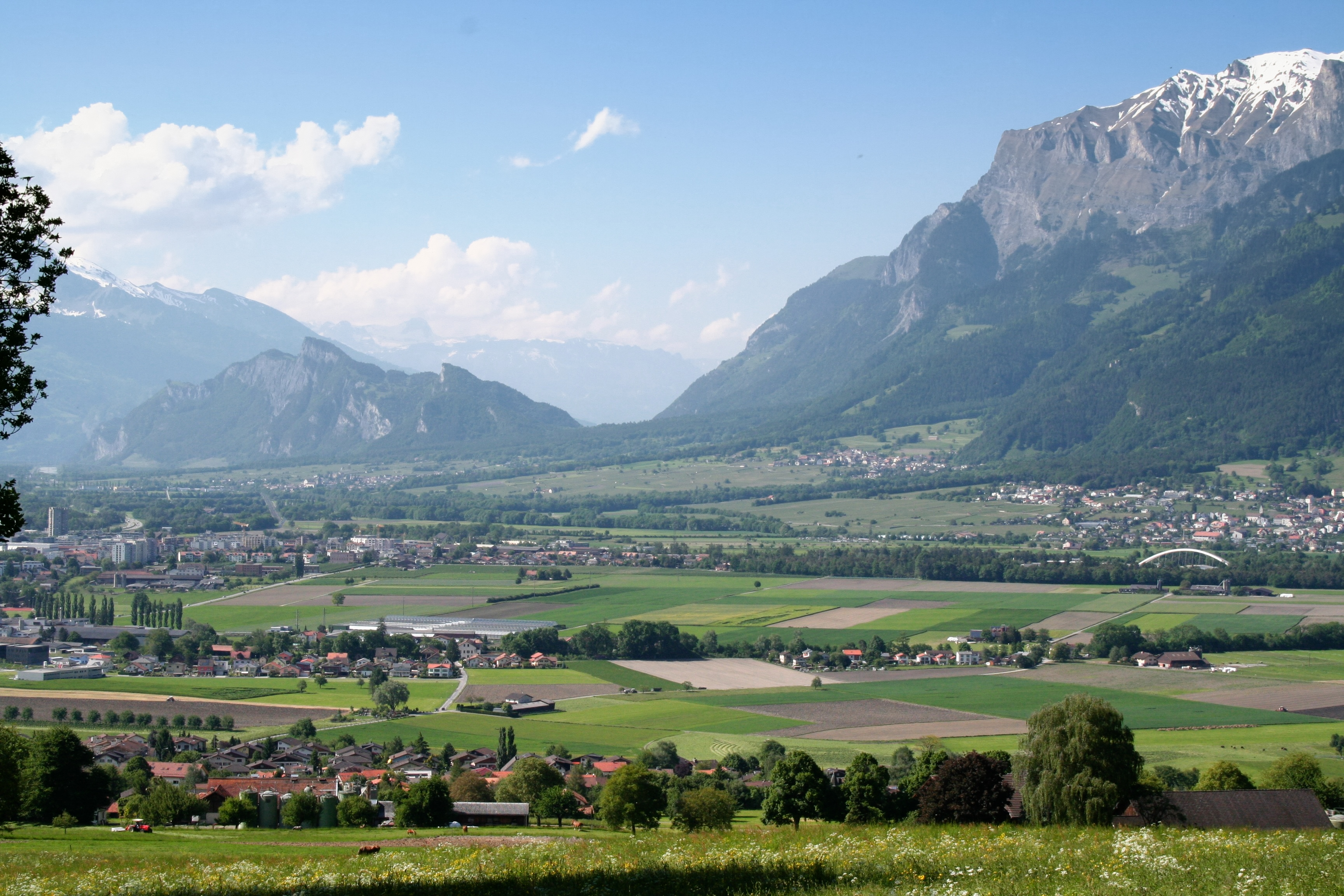
Valley with (l to r) Landquart, Maienfeld, Jenins and Malans.

Aerial view (1954)

Jenins has an area, as of 2006, of 10.5 km^{2} (4.1 sq mi). Of this area, 48% is used for agricultural purposes, while 40.1% is forested. Of the rest of the land, 3.6% is settled (buildings or roads) and the remainder (8.3%) is non-productive (rivers, glaciers or mountains).

Before 2017, the municipality was located in the Maienfeld sub-district of the Landquart district, after 2017 it was part of the Landquart Region.

== Demographics ==
Jenins has a population (as of 31 December 2020) of 915. As of 2008, 10.6% of the population was made up of foreign nationals. Over the last 10 years the population has grown at a rate of 8.6%. Most of the population (as of 2000) speaks German (93.8%), with Romansh being second most common ( 1.2%) and English being third ( 0.9%).

As of 2000, the gender distribution of the population was 49.1% male and 50.9% female. The age distribution, as of 2000, in Jenins is; 107 children or 14.3% of the population are between 0 and 9 years old. 48 teenagers or 6.4% are 10 to 14, and 35 teenagers or 4.7% are 15 to 19. Of the adult population, 71 people or 9.5% of the population are between 20 and 29 years old. 134 people or 18.0% are 30 to 39, 118 people or 15.8% are 40 to 49, and 91 people or 12.2% are 50 to 59. The senior population distribution is 60 people or 8.0% of the population are between 60 and 69 years old, 51 people or 6.8% are 70 to 79, there are 26 people or 3.5% who are 80 to 89, and there are 5 people or 0.7% who are 90 to 99.

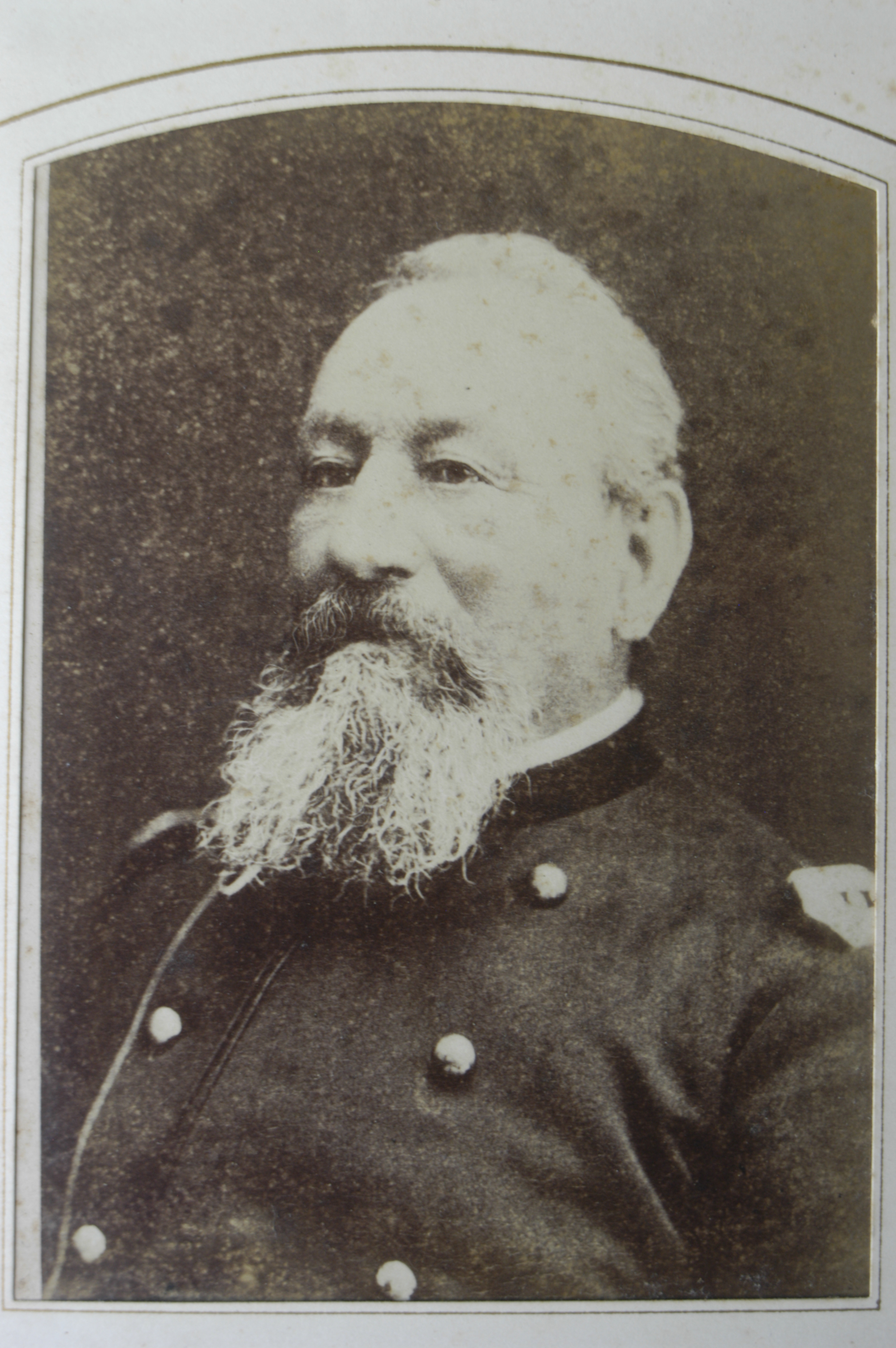
Colonel Jakob von Salis-Jenins (1815-1886).

In the 2007 federal election the most popular party was the SVP which received 40.7% of the vote. The next three most popular parties were the SP (22.5%), the FDP (20.4%) and the CVP (13.4%).

In Jenins about 77.4% of the population (between age 25-64) have completed either non-mandatory upper secondary education or additional higher education (either university or a Fachhochschule).

Jenins has an unemployment rate of 0.68%. As of 2005, there were 107 people employed in the primary economic sector and about 29 businesses involved in this sector. 35 people are employed in the secondary sector and there are 8 businesses in this sector. 107 people are employed in the tertiary sector, with 14 businesses in this sector.

The historical population is given in the following table:

| year | population |
|---|---|
| 1850 | 481 |
| 1900 | 450 |
| 1950 | 461 |
| 1960 | 398 |
| 1970 | 468 |
| 1980 | 557 |
| 1990 | 654 |
| 2000 | 746 |

== Heritage sites of national significance ==
Neu-Aspermont Castle is listed as a Swiss heritage site of national significance.

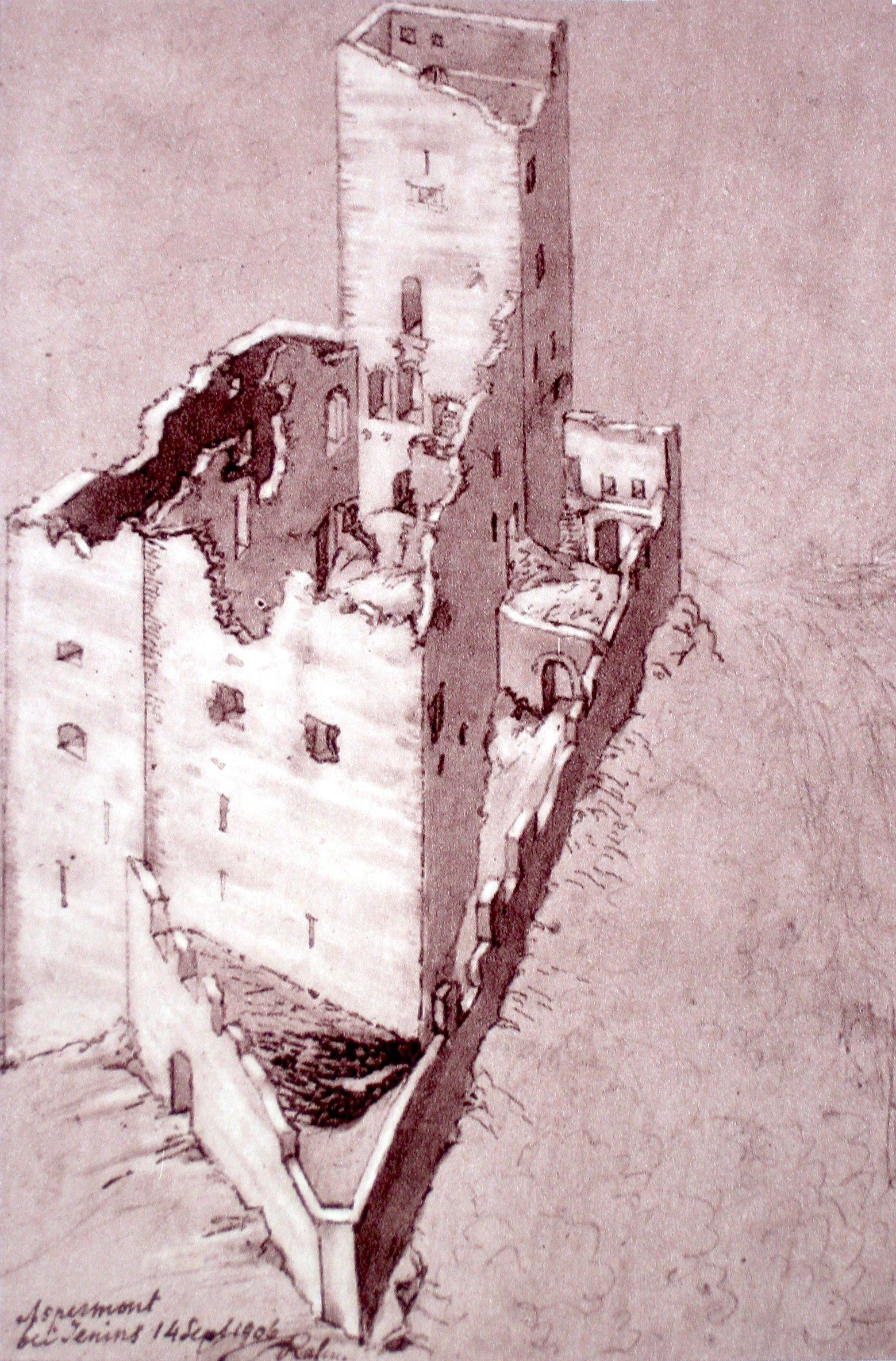
Sketch of Neu-Aspermont

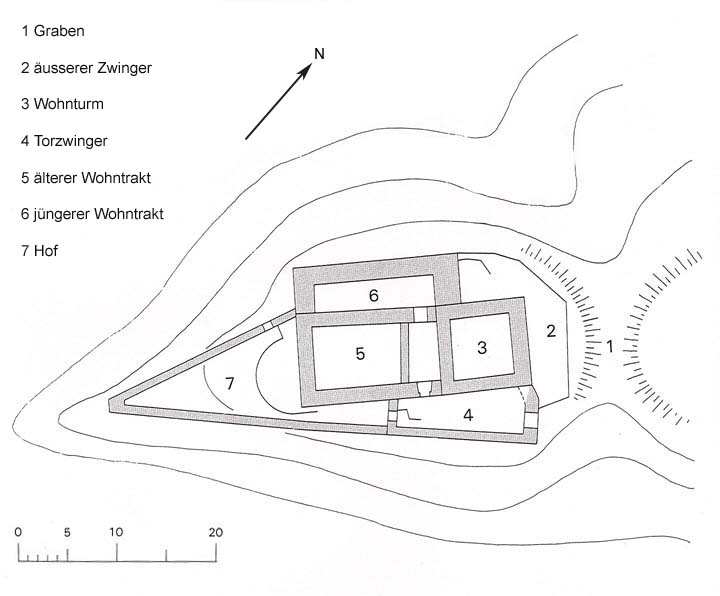
Layout of Castle Neu-Aspermont

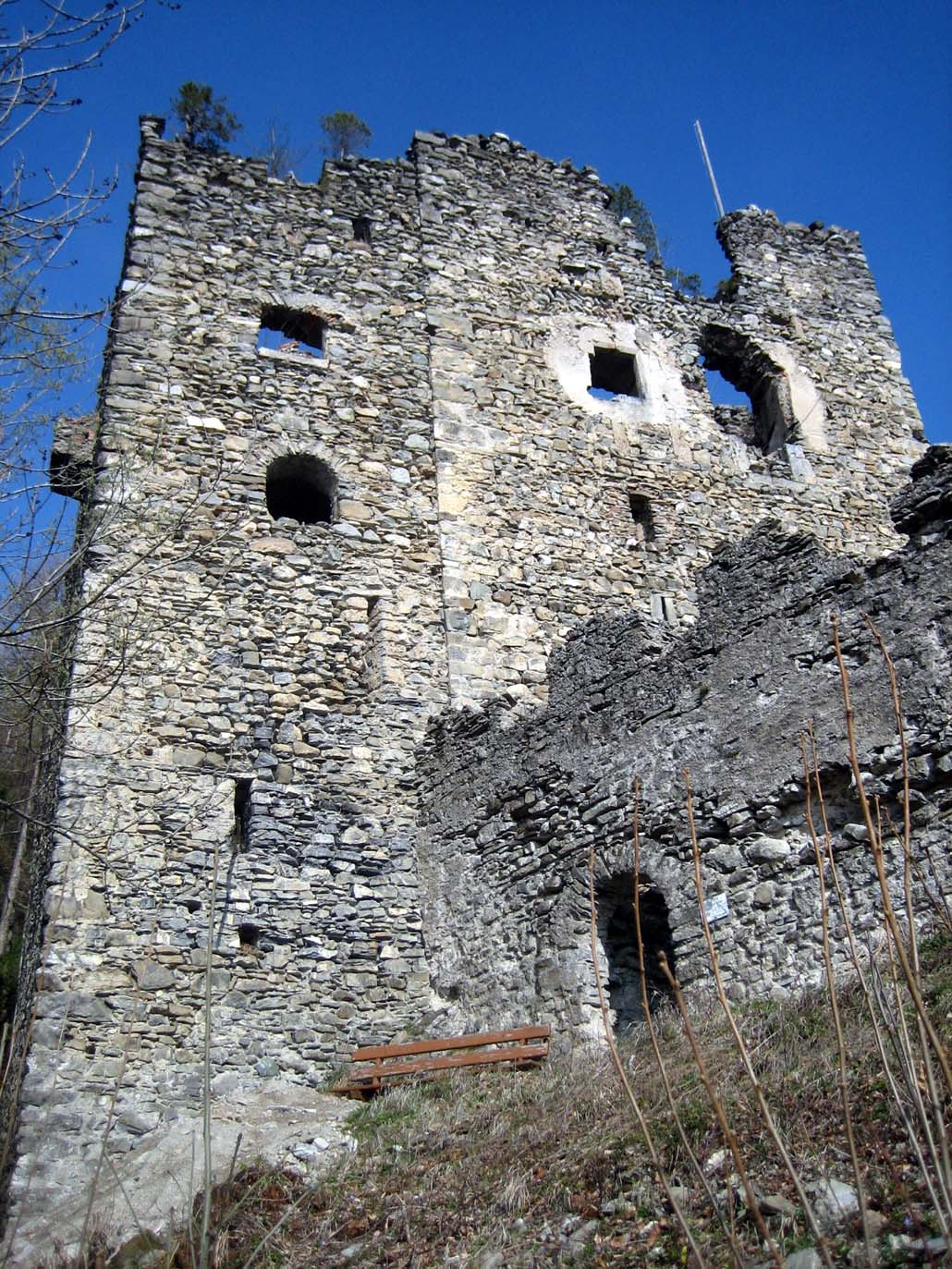
Neu-Aspermont from the west

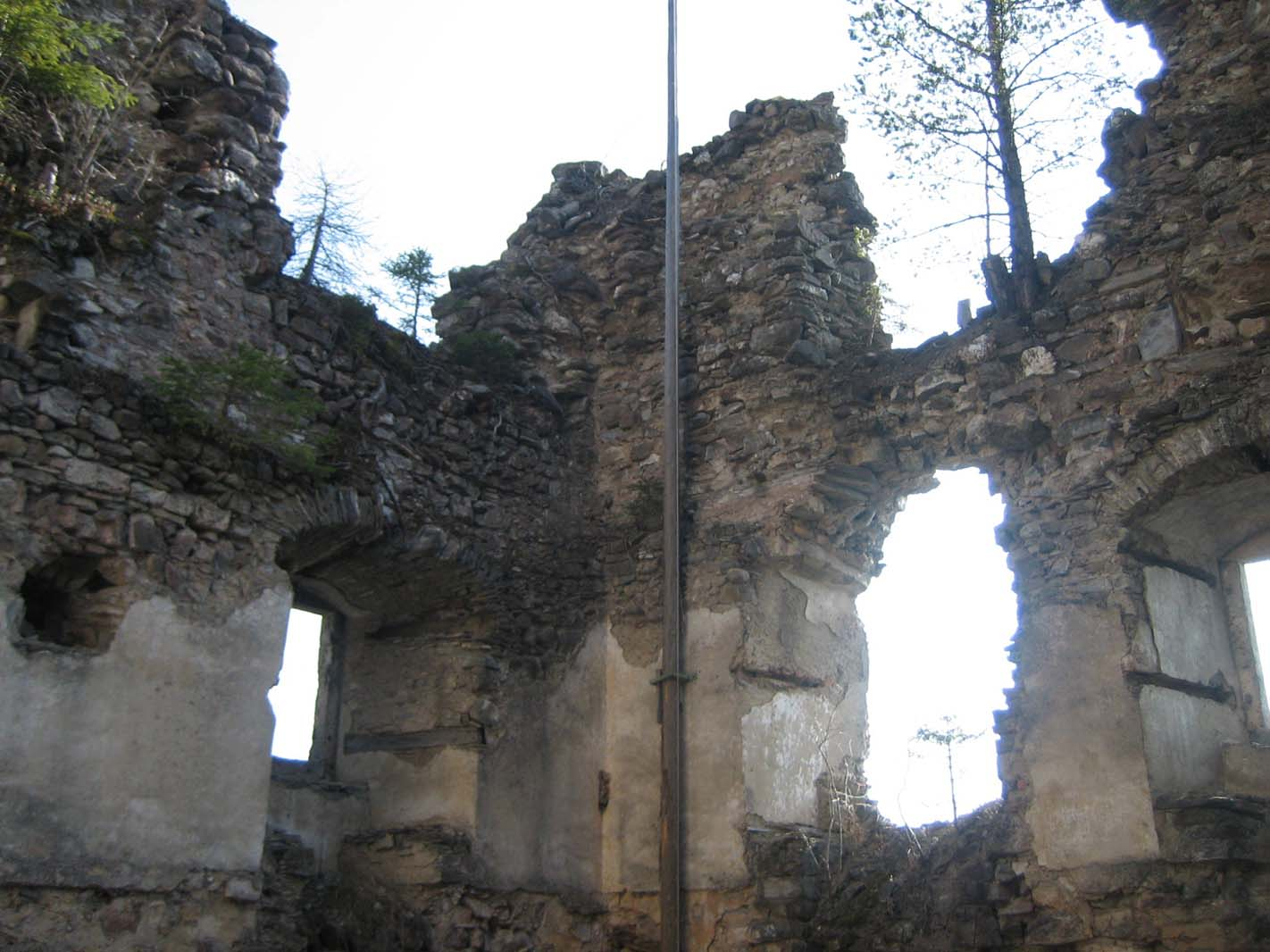
Interior of the living quarters

== Sights ==
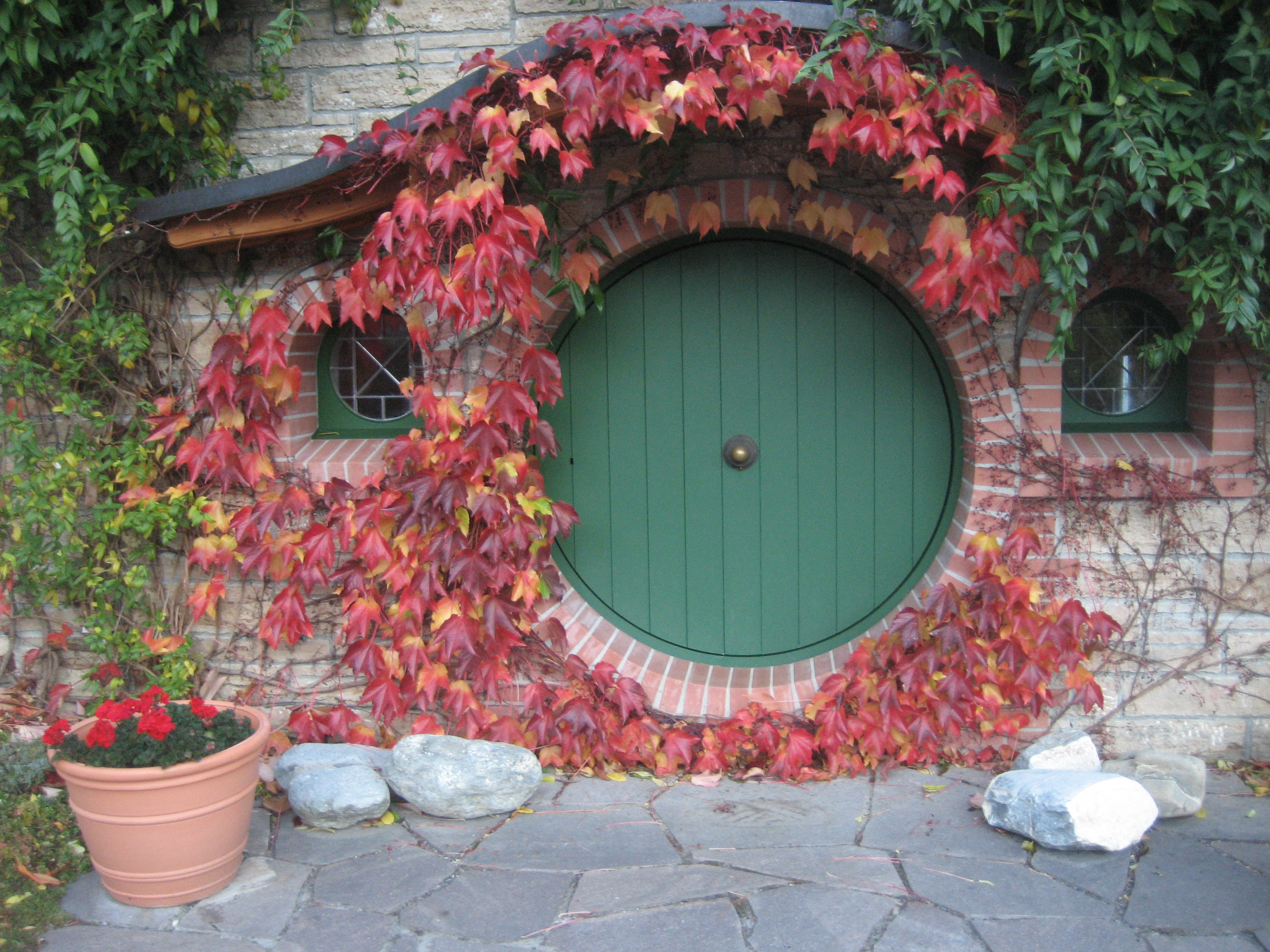
Greisinger Museum Entrance Door

The Greisinger Museum houses the Greisinger Collection, Bernd Greisinger's private collection focused on J. R. R. Tolkien's Middle-earth. The collection, consists primarily of art and literature and collector's items of any kind. It opened on 4 October 2013. The museum is a non-profit foundation. The main entrance is a round hobbit door and many of the rooms are underground.

The construction of the museum started in mid-2008. Planning and building of the museum were orientated on optimizing the use of the Greisinger Collection.
