= Landquart =

Landquart may refer to:

- Landquart (river), a river in Graubünden, Switzerland
- Landquart (district), a district in Graubünden, Switzerland
- Landquart, Switzerland, a municipality in Graubünden, Switzerland
- Landquart railway station

== See also ==
- Landquart Ried railway station
