= Landquart railway station (disambiguation) =

Landquart railway station may refer to one of several railway stations in Landquart, Switzerland:

- Landquart railway station
- Landquart Ried railway station

== See also ==
- Igis railway station in Landquart municipality
