= Landquart District =

Coordinates: 46°58′N 9°33′E

Landquart District Bezirk Landquart
- District
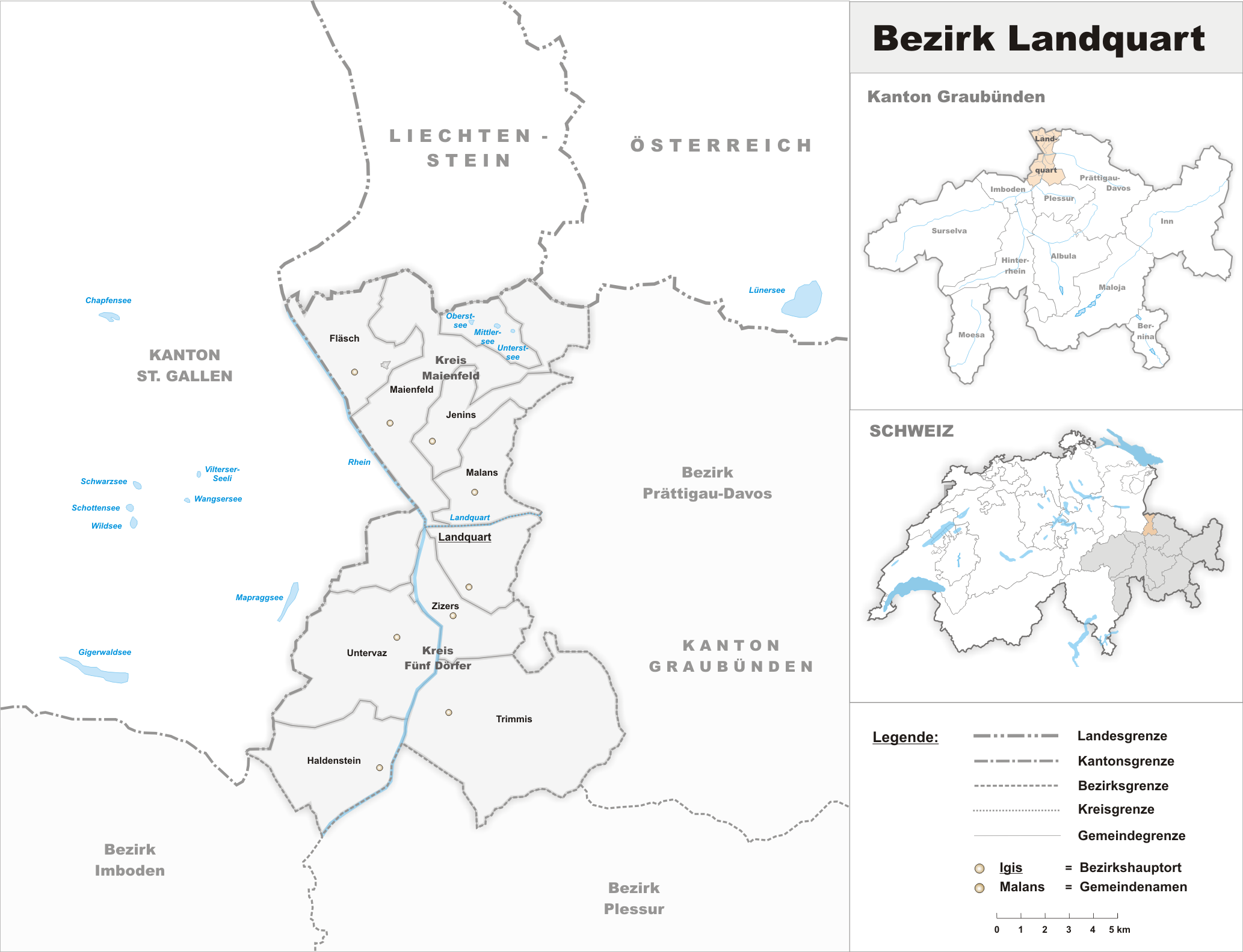
- Country: Switzerland
- Canton: Graubünden
- Capital: Igis

Area
  - Total: 193.23 km^{2} (74.61 sq mi)

Population (2020)
  - Total: 25,555
  - Density: 132.25/km^{2} (342.53/sq mi)
- Time zone: UTC+1 (CET)
  - Summer (DST): UTC+2 (CEST)
- Municipalities: 9

Landquart District is a former administrative district in the canton of Graubünden, Switzerland. It had an area of 193.91 km^{2} (74.87 sq mi) and has a population of 25,555 in 2015. It was replaced with the Landquart Region on 1 January 2017 as part of a reorganization of the Canton.

It consisted of two Kreise (circles) and nine municipalities:

Fünf Dörfer circle
Municipality	Population (31 December 2020)	Area (km^{2})
Haldenstein	1,088	18.55
Landquart	8,857	18.86
Trimmis	3,322	28.47
Untervaz	2,527	27.67
Zizers	3,520	10.96

In 2008 the municipality of Says merged into Trimmis. In 2012, the municipalities of Igis and Mastrils merged to form the new municipality of Landquart.

Maienfeld circle
Municipality	Population (31 December 2020)	Area (km^{2})
Fläsch	831	19.95
Jenins	915	10.50
Maienfeld	3,029	32.37
Malans	2,462	11.38

The district was formerly called Unterlandquart and additionally included the sub-districts of Schiers and Seewis, now part of Prättigau/Davos.

== Languages ==
Languages of Landquart District, GR
Languages	Census 2000	
Languages	Number	Percent
German	19,722	89.3%
Romansh	448	2.0%
Italian	457	2.1%
TOTAL	22,075	100%
