= Lower Castle Zizers =

Castle in Switzerland

Coordinates: 46°56′02″N 9°33′55″E

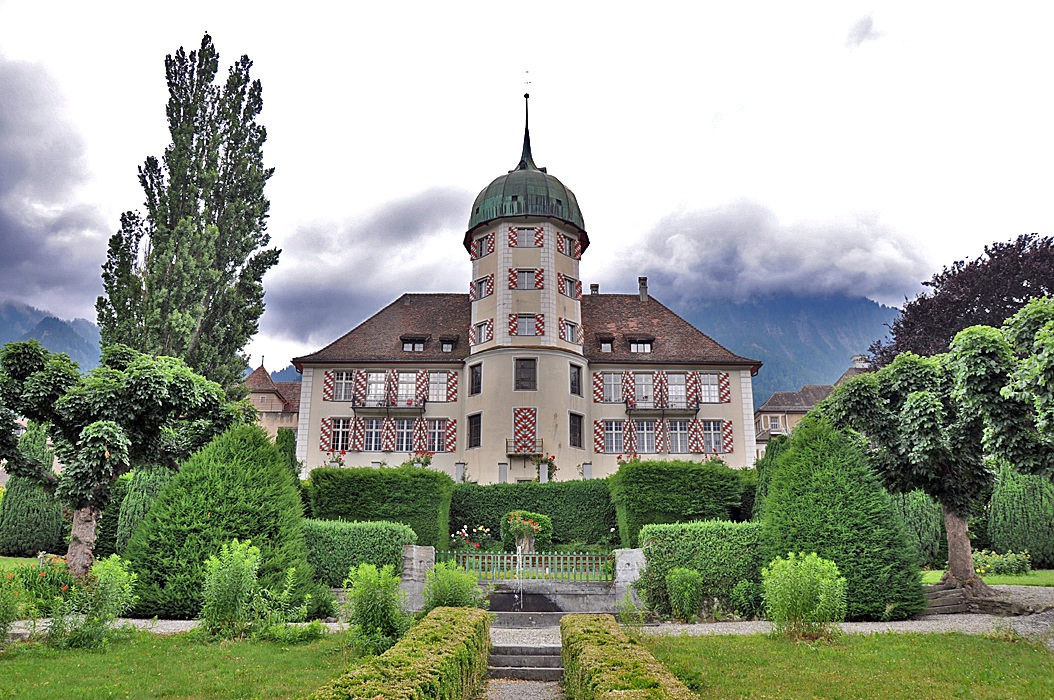
The St. Johannesstift or Lower Castle Zizers

Lower Castle Zizers is a castle located in the municipality of Zizers in the Canton of Graubünden, Switzerland. It is a Swiss heritage site of national significance.

== See also ==
- List of castles in Switzerland
