= Igis railway station =

Railway station in Switzerland

Igis
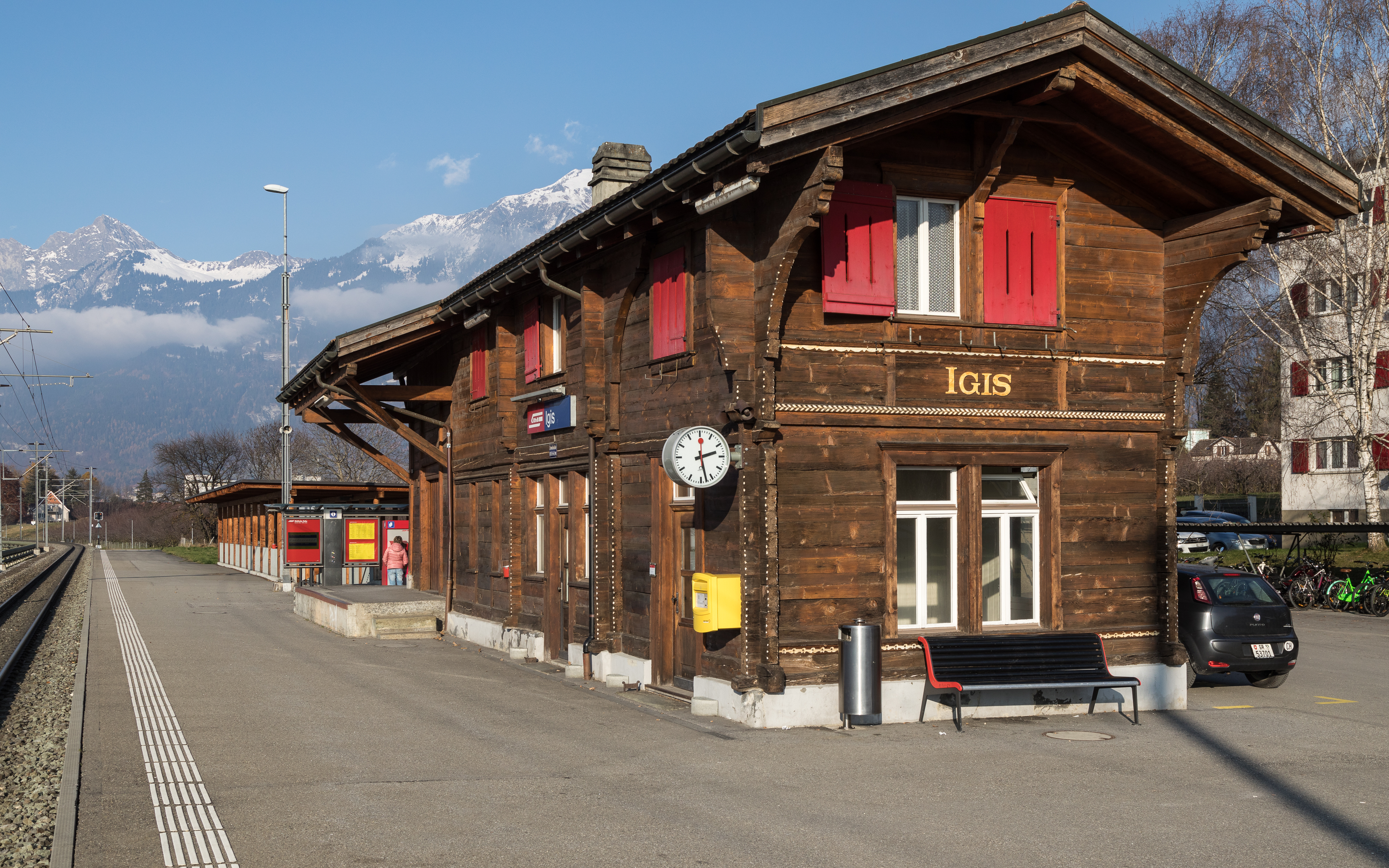
- The station building in 2017

General information
- Location: Stationsstrasse 1 Landquart; Switzerland
- Coordinates: 46°56′59″N 9°33′53″E
- Elevation: 523 m (1,716 ft)
- Owner: Rhaetian Railway
- Line: Landquart–Thusis line
- Distance: 2.2 km (1.4 mi) from Landquart
- Train operators: Rhaetian Railway

History
- Opened: 29 August 1896
- Electrified: 1 August 1921

Passengers
- 2018: 460 per weekday

Services
Preceding station	Chur S-Bahn	Following station
Zizers towards Thusis	S1	Landquart Ried towards Schiers
Zizers towards Rhäzüns	S2	Landquart Ried towards Schiers
Location

Igis railway station (German: Bahnhof Igis) is a railway station in the village of Igis, within the municipality of Landquart, in the Swiss canton of Grisons. It is an intermediate stop on the Rhaetian Railway 1,000 mm (3 ft 3 3/8 in) metre gauge Landquart–Thusis line. The Swiss Federal Railways standard gauge Chur–Rorschach line runs parallel but has no intermediate stops between Chur and Landquart.

== Services ==
As of the December 2023 timetable change, the following services stop at Igis:

- Chur S-Bahn: S1 / S2: half-hourly service between Rhäzüns and Schiers and hourly service to Thusis.
