= Mastrils =

- Former municipality
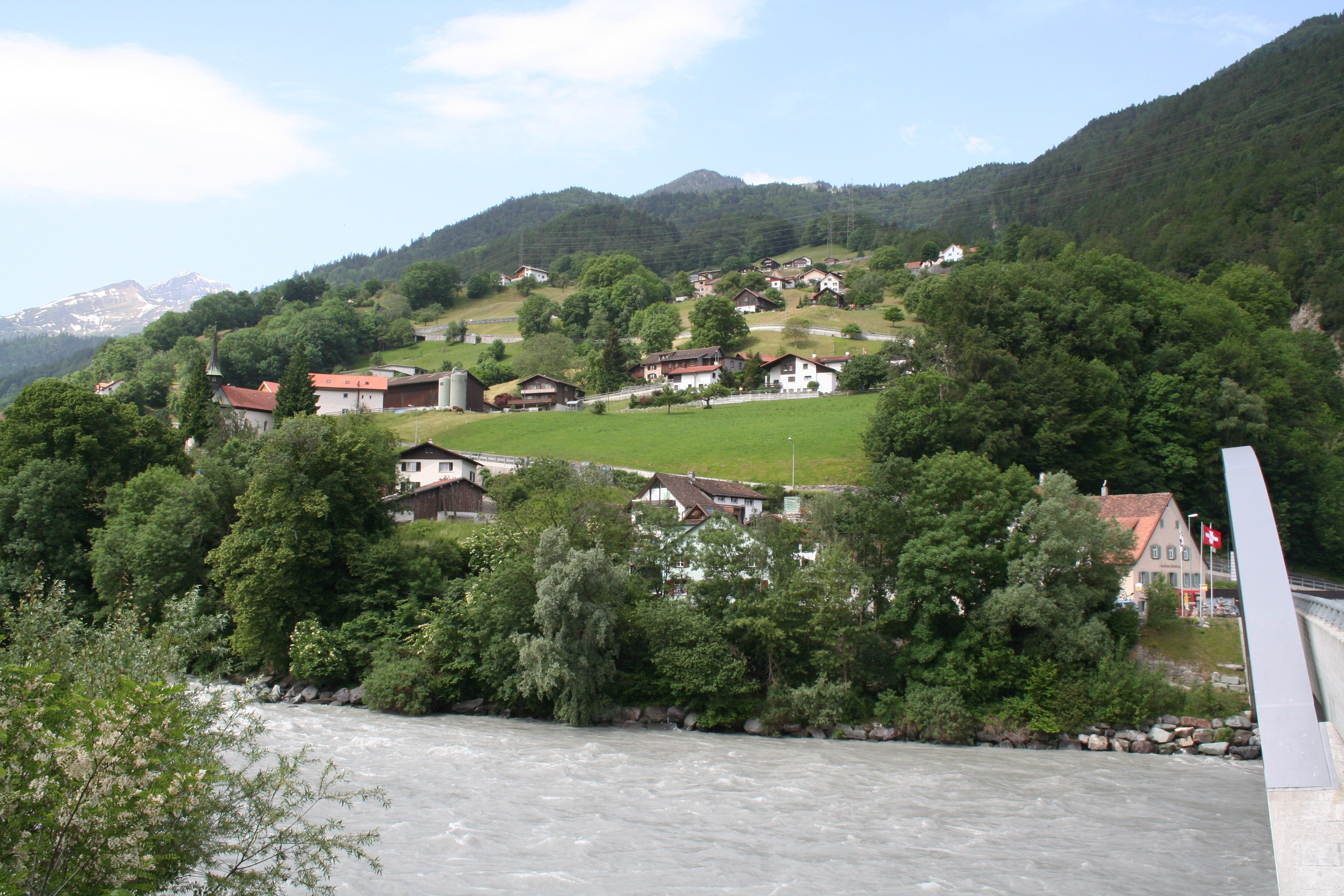

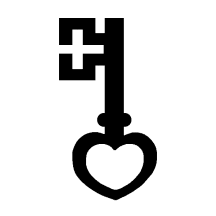
- Flag Coat of arms
- Location of Mastrils
- Location within Switzerland Location within Canton of Graubünden
- Coordinates: 46°58′N 9°32′E
- Country: Switzerland
- Canton: Graubünden
- District: Landquart

Area
  - Total: 7.98 km^{2} (3.08 sq mi)
- Elevation: 550 m (1,800 ft)

Population (December 2020)
  - Total: 548
  - Density: 68.7/km^{2} (178/sq mi)
- Time zone: UTC+01:00 (CET)
  - Summer (DST): UTC+02:00 (CEST)
- Postal code: 7303
- SFOS number: 3943
- ISO 3166 code: CH-GR
- Surrounded by: Bad Ragaz (SG), Igis, Maienfeld, Pfäfers (SG), Untervaz, Zizers
- Website: www.mastrils.ch

Mastrils is a former municipality in the district of Landquart in the Swiss canton of Graubünden. The municipalities of Igis and Mastrils merged on 1 January 2012 into the new municipality of Landquart.

== History ==
Mastrils is first mentioned in 1318 as Ponstrils. In 1345 it was mentioned as Bastrils. In 1854 the municipality separated from Zizers to become an independent municipality.

== Geography ==
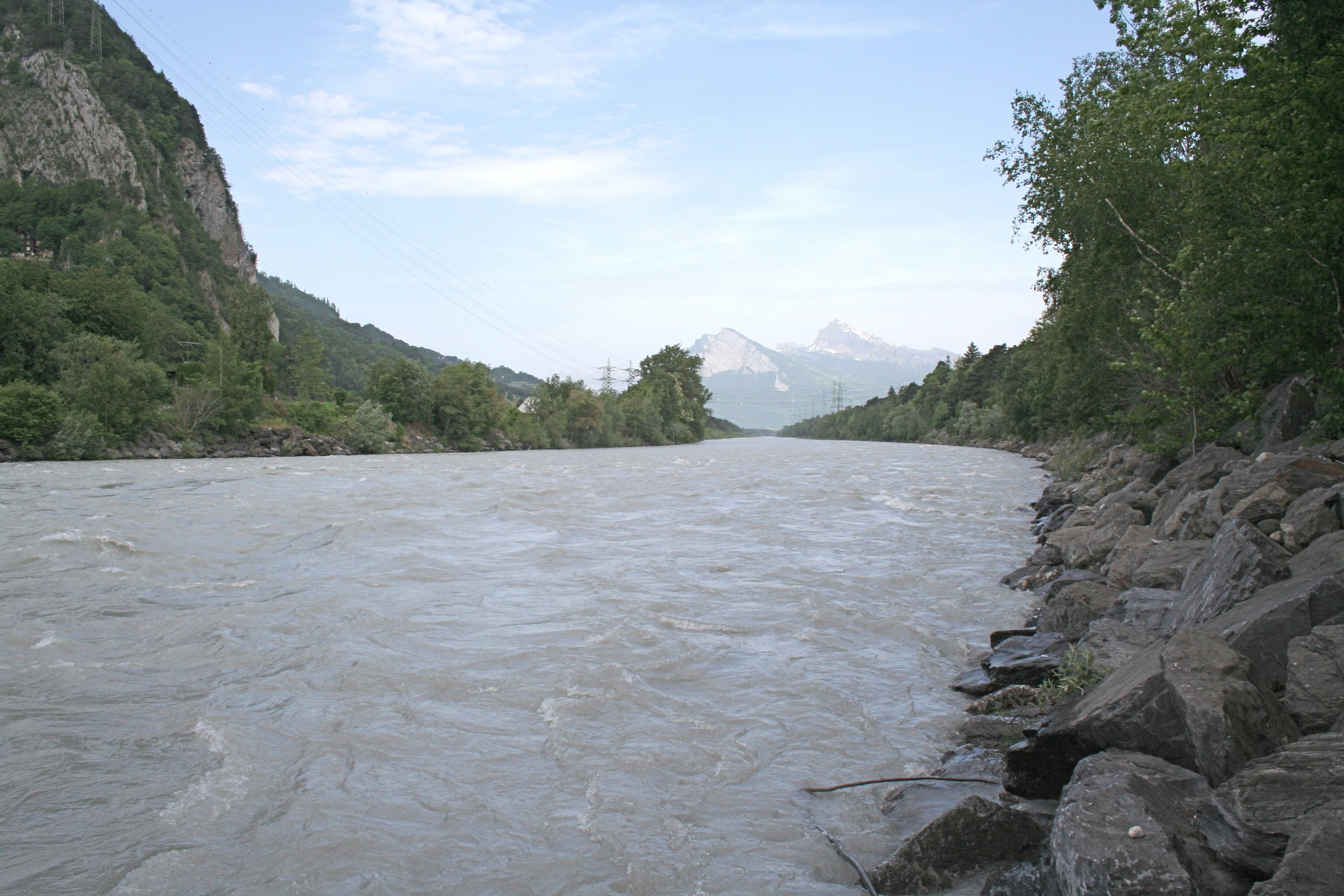
Rhein river near Mastrils

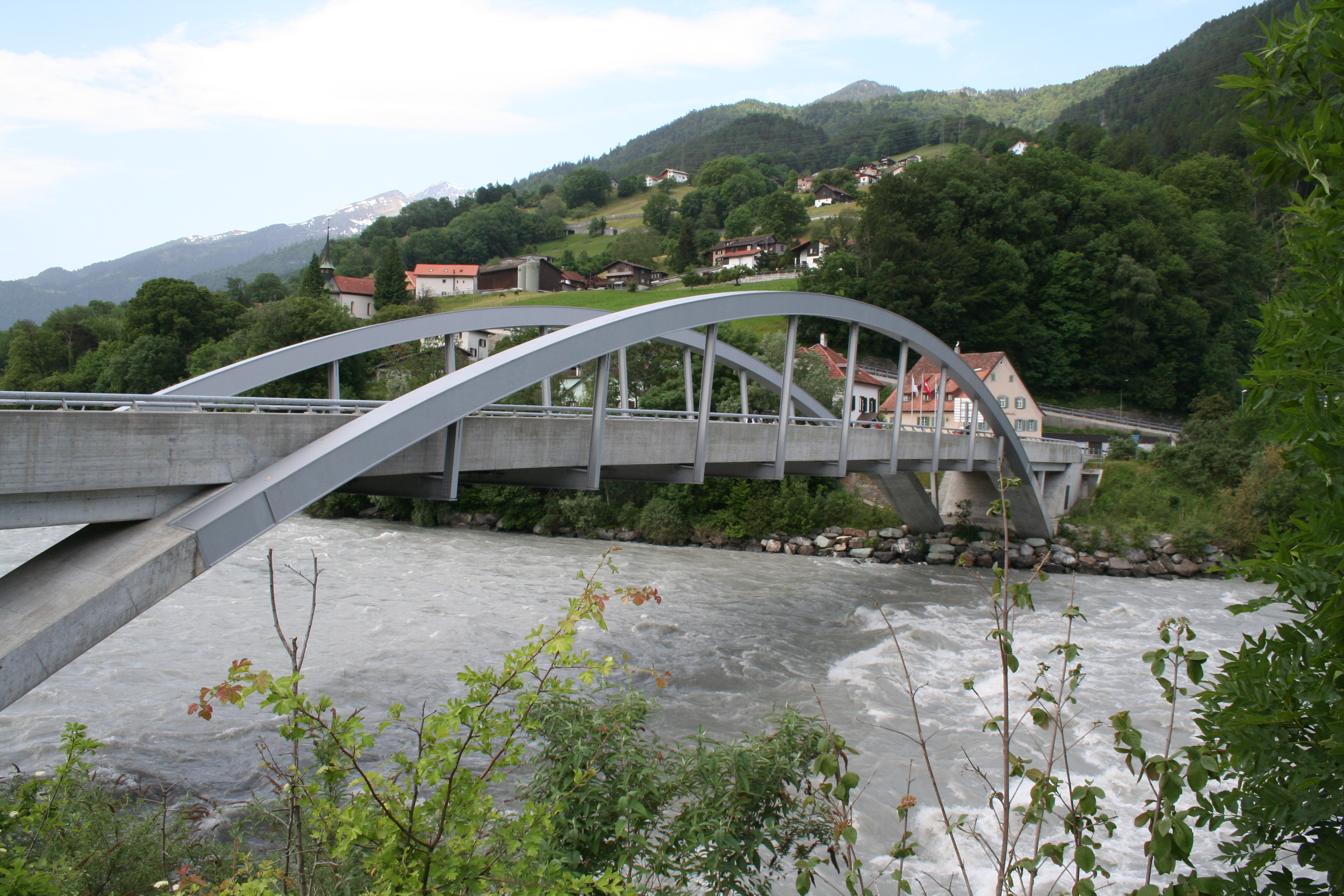
Tardisbrücke village and Tardis bridge (in German: Tardisbrücke)

Mastrils has an area, as of 2006, of 8 km^{2} (3.1 sq mi). Of this area, 23.9% is used for agricultural purposes, while 68.8% is forested. Of the rest of the land, 2.5% is settled (buildings or roads) and the remainder (4.9%) is non-productive (rivers, glaciers or mountains).

The municipality is located in the Fünf Dörfer sub-district of the Landquart district. It is a widely scattered settlement on in the foothills of the Calanda mountains. It consists of the settlements of Isla, Tardisbrücke and Trätsch.

== Demographics ==
Mastrils has a population (as of 31 December 2020) of 548. As of 2008, 8.5% of the population was made up of foreign nationals. Over the last 10 years the population has grown at a rate of 1.1%. Most of the population (as of 2000) speaks German (93.0%), with Italian being second most common ( 1.9%) and Romansh being third ( 1.5%).

As of 2000, the gender distribution of the population was 49.4% male and 50.6% female. The age distribution, as of 2000, in Mastrils is; 54 children or 10.2% of the population are between 0 and 9 years old. 31 teenagers or 5.9% are 10 to 14, and 48 teenagers or 9.1% are 15 to 19. Of the adult population, 53 people or 10.0% of the population are between 20 and 29 years old. 88 people or 16.6% are 30 to 39, 86 people or 16.3% are 40 to 49, and 82 people or 15.5% are 50 to 59. The senior population distribution is 38 people or 7.2% of the population are between 60 and 69 years old, 38 people or 7.2% are 70 to 79, there are 10 people or 1.9% who are 80 to 89, and there are 1 people or 0.2% who are 90 to 99.

In the 2007 federal election the most popular party was the SVP which received 35.8% of the vote. The next three most popular parties were the SP (29%), the CVP (14.8%) and the FDP (14.4%).

The entire Swiss population is generally well educated. In Mastrils about 71.8% of the population (between age 25-64) have completed either non-mandatory upper secondary education or additional higher education (either university or a Fachhochschule).

Mastrils has an unemployment rate of 1.08%. As of 2005, there were 36 people employed in the primary economic sector and about 16 businesses involved in this sector. 14 people are employed in the secondary sector and there are 5 businesses in this sector. 44 people are employed in the tertiary sector, with 12 businesses in this sector.

The historical population is given in the following table:

Year	Population
1850	460
1900	322
1950	433
1970	464
1990	585
2000	529
