= Zizers =

- Municipality
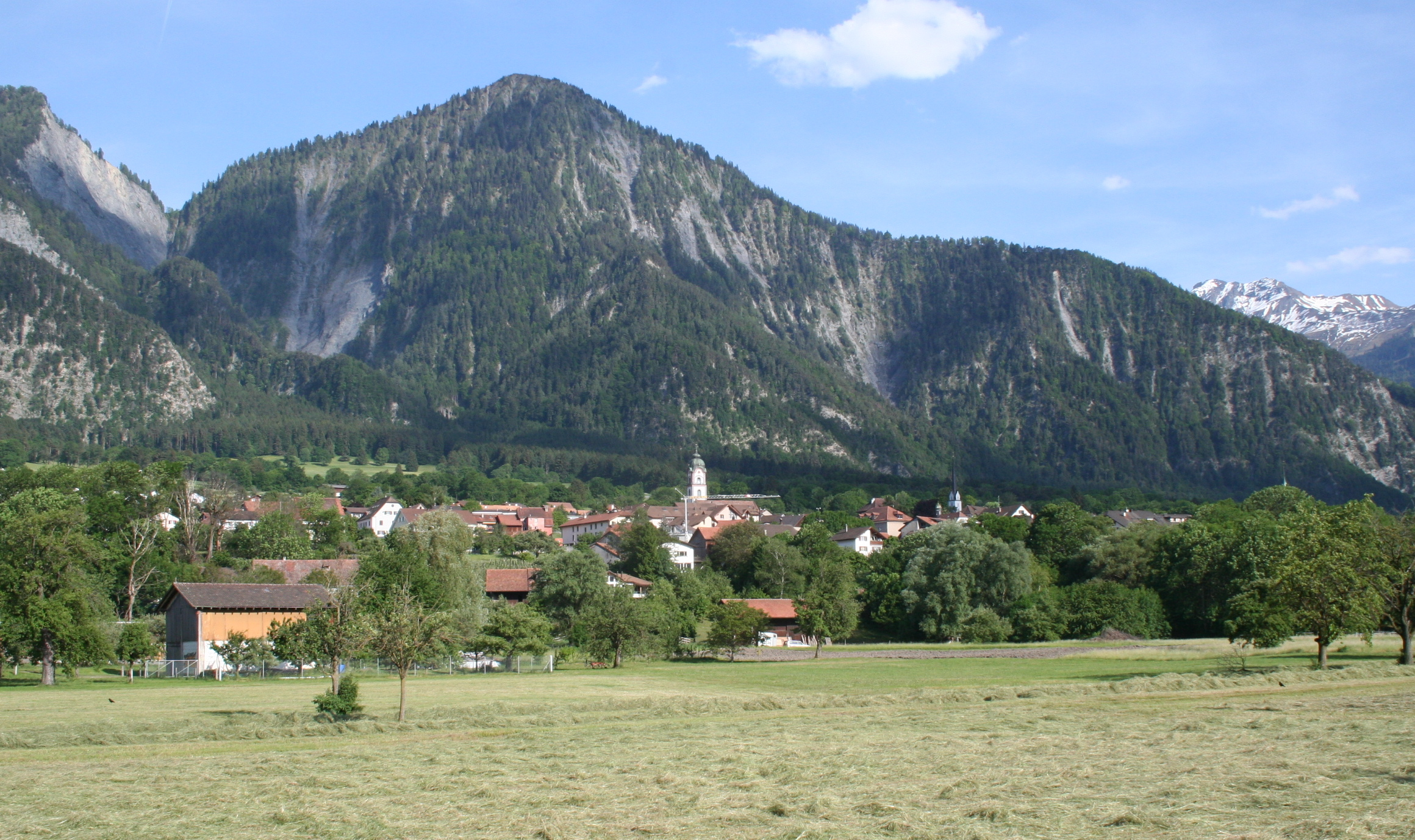

- Flag Coat of arms
- Location of Zizers
- Location within Switzerland Location within Canton of Grisons
- Coordinates: 46°56′N 9°34′E
- Country: Switzerland
- Canton: Grisons
- District: Landquart

Area
  - Total: 11.01 km^{2} (4.25 sq mi)
- Elevation: 561 m (1,841 ft)

Population (December 2020)
  - Total: 3,520
  - Density: 320/km^{2} (828/sq mi)
- Time zone: UTC+01:00 (CET)
  - Summer (DST): UTC+02:00 (CEST)
- Postal code: 7205
- SFOS number: 3947
- ISO 3166 code: CH-GR
- Surrounded by: Grüsch, Landquart, Maienfeld, Trimmis, Untervaz
- Website: www.zizers.ch

Zizers (Romansh: Zezras) is a municipality in the Landquart Region in the Swiss canton of the Grisons.

== History ==
Zizers is first mentioned in 824 as Zizuris. Of note, Zita of Bourbon-Parma, last Empress of Austria-Hungary, died in Lower Castle Zizers where she had long resided.

== Geography ==
Aerial view from 400 m by Walter Mittelholzer (1923)

Zizers has an area, (as of the 2004/09 survey) of 11.01 km^{2} (4.25 sq mi). Of this area, about 39.1% is used for agricultural purposes, while 38.0% is forested. Of the rest of the land, 14.5% is settled (buildings or roads) and 8.4% is unproductive land. In the 2004/09 survey a total of 76 ha (190 acres) or about 6.9% of the total area was covered with buildings, an increase of 25 ha (62 acres) over the 1985 amount. Of the agricultural land, 56 ha (140 acres) is used for orchards and vineyards and 402 ha (990 acres) is fields and grasslands. Since 1985 the amount of agricultural land has decreased by 37 ha (91 acres). Over the same time period the amount of forested land has increased by 5 ha (12 acres). Rivers and lakes cover 35 ha (86 acres) in the municipality.

Before 2017, the municipality was the capital of the sub-district of Fünf Dörfer in the Landquart district, after 2017 it was part of the Landquart Region. It is located on the most important road through the Rhine river valley.

Until 1854 Mastrils was part of Zizers. In 1913 the enclaves of Oberzollbruck (population in 1910, 30), Russhof (population 91) and Untere Mühle (population 8) became part of Igis.

== Demographics ==
Zizers has a population (as of December 2020) of 3,520. As of 2015, 14.0% of the population are resident foreign nationals. Over the last 5 years (2010-2015) the population has changed at a rate of 5.36%. The birth rate in the municipality, in 2015, was 10.5, while the death rate was 6.9 per thousand residents.

As of 2015, children and teenagers (0–19 years old) make up 20.7% of the population, while adults (20–64 years old) are 61.7% of the population and seniors (over 64 years old) make up 17.6%. In 2015 there were 1,427 single residents, 1,525 people who were married or in a civil partnership, 170 widows or widowers and 239 divorced residents.

In 2015 there were 1,427 private households in Zizers with an average household size of 2.32 persons. In 2015 about 59.5% of all buildings in the municipality were single family homes, which is greater than the percentage in the canton (49.4%) and about the same as the percentage nationally (57.4%). Of the 680 inhabited buildings in the municipality, in 2000, about 60.6% were single family homes and 21.8% were multiple family buildings. Additionally, about 15.4% of the buildings were built before 1919, while 16.9% were built between 1991 and 2000. In 2014 the rate of construction of new housing units per 1000 residents was 15.96. The vacancy rate for the municipality, in 2016, was 0.38%.

Most of the population (as of 2000) speaks German (88.7%), with Italian being second most common (3.2%) and Serbo-Croatian being third (2.0%).

The historical population is given in the following chart:

== Heritage sites of national significance ==
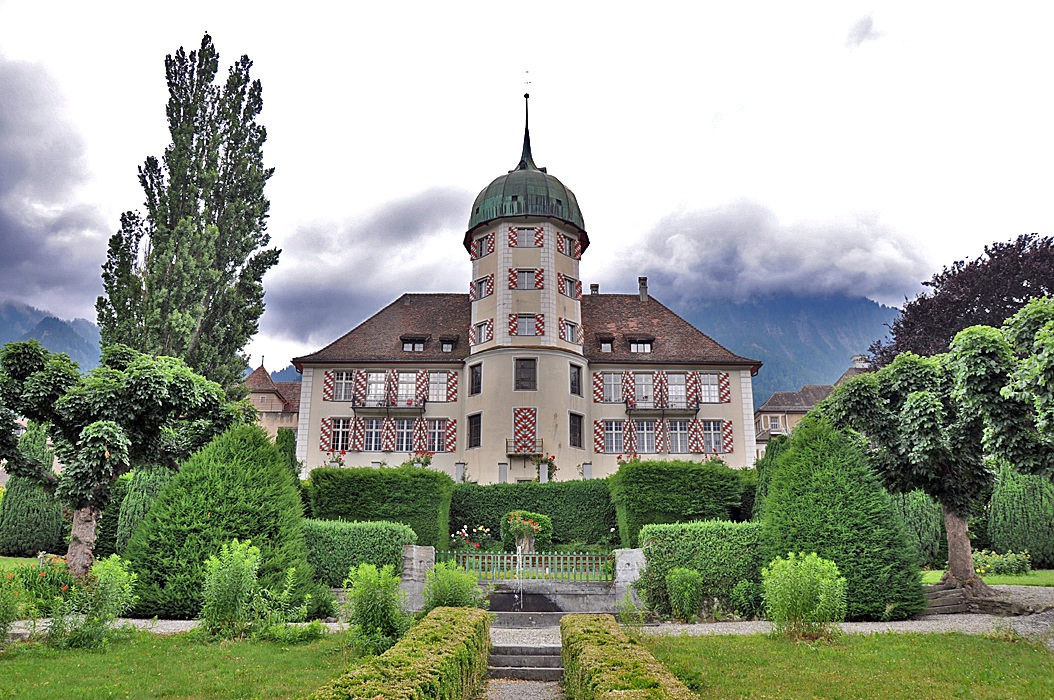
The St. Johannesstift or Lower Castle Zizers

Both the Upper Castle Zizers with gardens and the Lower Castle Zizers (known as Johannesstift) with its gardens are listed as Swiss heritage sites of national significance.

== Politics ==
In the 2015 federal election the most popular party was the SVP with 34.1% of the vote. The next three most popular parties were the BDP (18.6%), the SP (16.4%) and the CVP (12.2%). In the federal election, a total of 969 votes were cast, and the voter turnout was 41.0%.

In the 2007 federal election the most popular party was the SVP which received 36.4% of the vote. The next three most popular parties were the SP (20%), the CVP (18.6%) and the FDP (18.5%).

== Education ==
In Zizers about 72.9% of the population (between age 25-64) have completed either non-mandatory upper secondary education or additional higher education (either university or a Fachhochschule).

== Economy ==
Zizers is a periurbane community. The municipality is part of the regional center of Landquart.

As of 2014, there were a total of 997 people employed in the municipality. Of these, a total of 71 people worked in 23 businesses in the primary economic sector. The secondary sector employed 280 workers in 41 separate businesses. A minority (45.0%) of the secondary sector employees worked in very small businesses (less than 10 employees). There were 4 small businesses (11-50 employees) with a total of 92 employees and one mid sized business with a total of 62 employees. Finally, the tertiary sector provided 646 jobs in 146 businesses. There were 8 small businesses with a total of 258 employees.

In 2015 a total of 16.% of the population received social assistance. In 2011 the unemployment rate in the municipality was 1.8%.

In 2015 the average cantonal, municipal and church tax rate in the municipality for a couple with two children making SFr 80,000 was 3.5% while the rate for a single person making SFr 150,000 was 15%, both of which are close to the average for the canton and nationally. In 2013 the average income in the municipality per tax payer was SFr 77,285 and the per person average was SFr 33,050, which is greater than the cantonal averages of SFr 69,964 but about the same as the per person amount of SFr 33,075. In contrast, the national tax payer average is SFr 82,682, while the per person average is SFr 35,825.

== Transportation ==
The municipality has a railway station, Zizers, on the Landquart–Thusis line. It has regular service to Rhäzüns, Thusis and Schiers.

== Religion ==
From the 2000 census, 1,286 or 43.1% are Roman Catholic, while 1,303 or 43.7% belonged to the Swiss Reformed Church. Of the rest of the population, there are 12 individuals (or about 0.40% of the population) who belong to the Orthodox Church, and there are 66 individuals (or about 2.21% of the population) who belong to another Christian church. There are 112 (or about 3.75% of the population) who are Islamic. There are 13 individuals (or about 0.44% of the population) who belong to another church (not listed on the census), 131 (or about 4.39% of the population) belong to no church, are agnostic or atheist, and 65 individuals (or about 2.18% of the population) did not answer the question.
