= Landquart Ried railway station =

Railway station in Switzerland

Landquart Ried
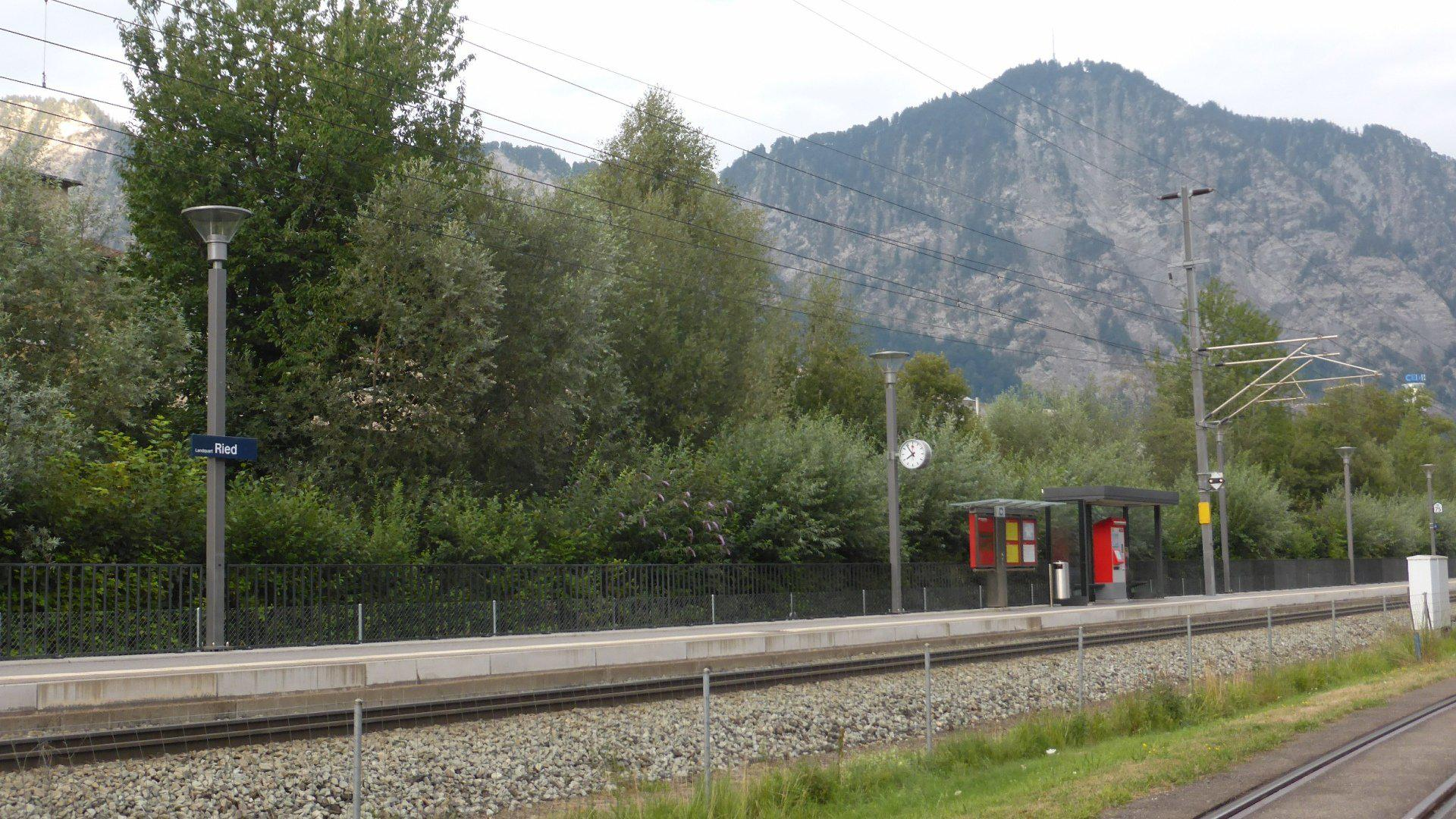
- The station in 2018

General information
- Location: Landquart; Switzerland
- Coordinates: 46°57′26″N 9°33′39″E
- Owner: Rhaetian Railway
- Line: Landquart–Thusis line
- Distance: 1.3 km (0.81 mi) from Landquart
- Train operators: Rhaetian Railway

Passengers
- 2018: 270 per weekday

Services
Preceding station	Chur S-Bahn	Following station
Igis towards Thusis	S1	Landquart towards Schiers
Igis towards Rhäzüns	S2	Landquart towards Schiers
Location

Landquart Ried railway station (German: Bahnhof Landquart Ried) is a railway station in the village of Igis, within the municipality of Landquart, in the Swiss canton of Grisons. It is an intermediate stop on the Rhaetian Railway 1,000 mm (3 ft 3 3/8 in) metre gauge Landquart–Thusis line. The Swiss Federal Railways standard gauge Chur–Rorschach line runs parallel but has no intermediate stops between Chur and Landquart.

== Services ==
As of the December 2023 timetable change, the following services stop at Landquart Ried:

- Chur S-Bahn: S1 / S2: half-hourly service between Rhäzüns and Schiers and hourly service to Thusis.
