= Landquart, Switzerland =

Municipality in the canton of the Grisons, Switzerland

Landquart
- Municipality
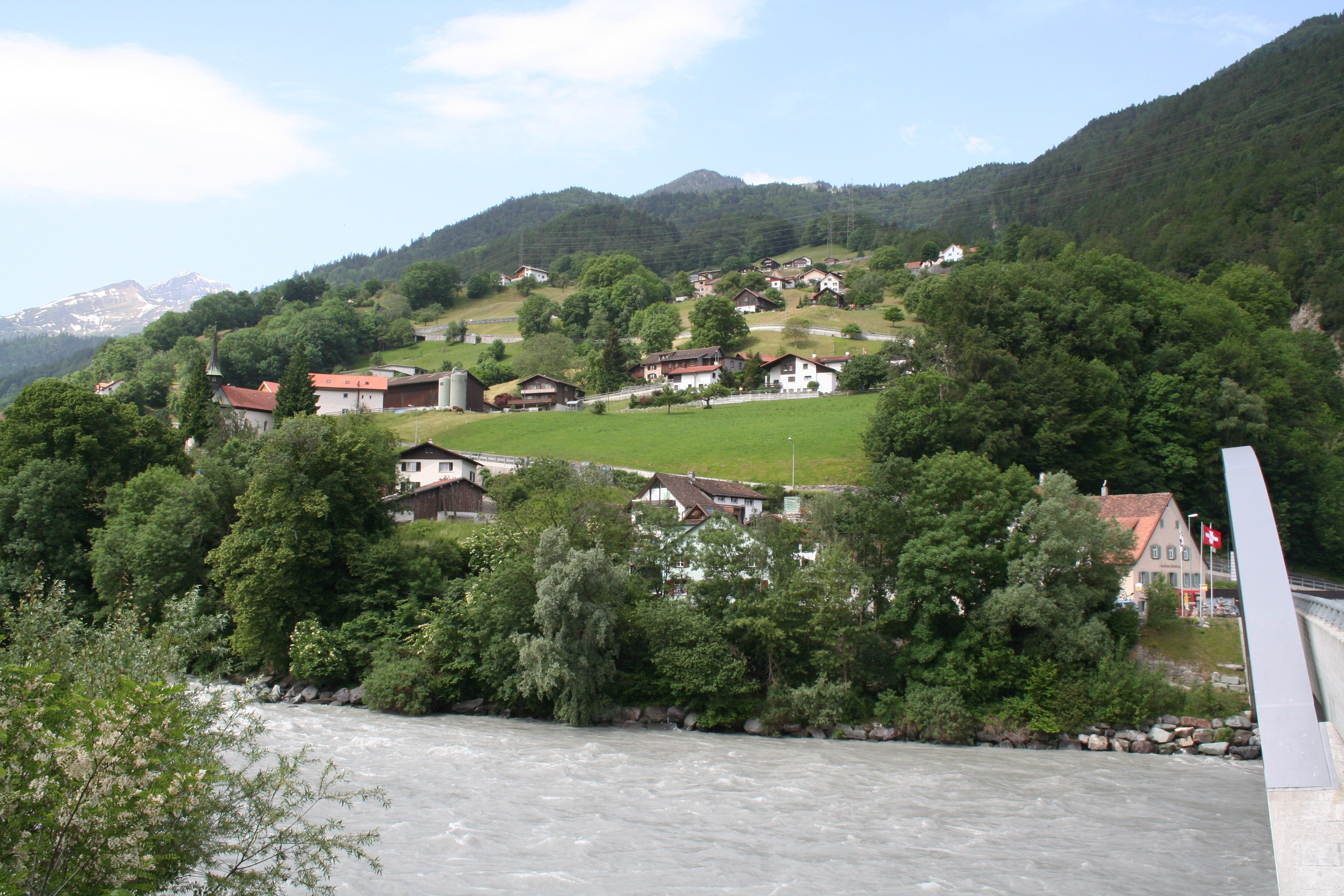
- Mastrils village in Landquart

- Flag Coat of arms
- Location of Landquart
- Location within Switzerland Location within Canton of Grisons
- Coordinates: 46°58′N 9°32′E
- Country: Switzerland
- Canton: Grisons
- District: Landquart

Government
  - Executive: Gemeindevorstand with 7 members
  - Mayor: Gemeindepräsident; Ernst Nigg (as of March 2014)

Area
  - Total: 7.98 km^{2} (3.08 sq mi)
- Elevation: 550 m (1,800 ft)

Population (December 2020)
  - Total: 8,857
  - Density: 1,110/km^{2} (2,870/sq mi)
- Time zone: UTC+01:00 (CET)
  - Summer (DST): UTC+02:00 (CEST)
- Postal code: 7303, 7206
- SFOS number: 3955
- ISO 3166 code: CH-GR
- Localities: Igis, Mastrils, Landquart
- Surrounded by: Bad Ragaz (SG), Maienfeld, Malans, Pfäfers (SG), Untervaz, Valzeina, Zizers
- Website: www.landquart.ch

Landquart is a municipality in the Landquart Region in the Swiss canton of the Grisons. It was formed when the municipalities of Igis and Mastrils merged on 1 January 2012 into the new municipality of Landquart. The municipality "Landquart" draws its name from a locality in the former municipality of Igis.

== History ==
Igis is first mentioned about 840 as Ovinae/Aviuns. In 1149 it was mentioned as Auuine, in 1225 as Huiuns and in 1253 as Yges. Mastrils is first mentioned in 1318 as Ponstrils. In 1345 it was mentioned as Bastrils.

== Geography ==
Aerial view (1963)

Landquart has an area, (based on the 2004/09 survey) of 18.86 km^{2} (7.28 sq mi). Of this area, about 34.7% is used for agricultural purposes, while 45.5% is forested. Of the rest of the land, 15.1% is settled (buildings or roads) and 4.8% is unproductive land. In the 2004/09 survey a total of 183 ha (450 acres) or about 9.7% of the total area was covered with buildings, an increase of 54 ha (130 acres) over the 1985 amount. Of the agricultural land, 28 ha (69 acres) is used for orchards and vineyards, 602 ha (1,490 acres) is fields and grasslands and 74 ha (180 acres) consists of alpine grazing areas. Since 1985 the amount of agricultural land has decreased by 74 ha (180 acres). Over the same time period the amount of forested land has increased by 13 ha (32 acres). Rivers and lakes cover 55 ha (140 acres) in the municipality.

== Demographics ==
Landquart has a population (as of December 2020) of 8,857. As of 2015, 20.2% of the population are resident foreign nationals. Over the last 5 years (2010-2015) the population has changed at a rate of 6.47%. The birth rate in the municipality, in 2015, was 9.7, while the death rate was 7.1 per thousand residents.

As of 2015, children and teenagers (0–19 years old) make up 19.6% of the population, while adults (20–64 years old) are 63.9% of the population and seniors (over 64 years old) make up 16.6%. In 2015 there were 3,566 single residents, 4,134 people who were married or in a civil partnership, 415 widows or widowers and 707 divorced residents.

In 2015 there were 3,812 private households in Landquart with an average household size of 2.29 persons. In 2015 about 60.2% of all buildings in the municipality were single family homes, which is greater than the percentage in the canton (49.4%) and about the same as the percentage nationally (57.4%). In 2014 the rate of construction of new housing units per 1000 residents was 14.73. The vacancy rate for the municipality, in 2016, was 0.6%.

== Historic Population ==
The historical population is given in the following chart:

== Sightseeing and culture ==
=== Heritage sites of national significance ===
Marschlins Castle and the surrounding grounds are listed as a Swiss heritage site of national significance. The castle is the family castle of the noble family of Salis-Marschlins.

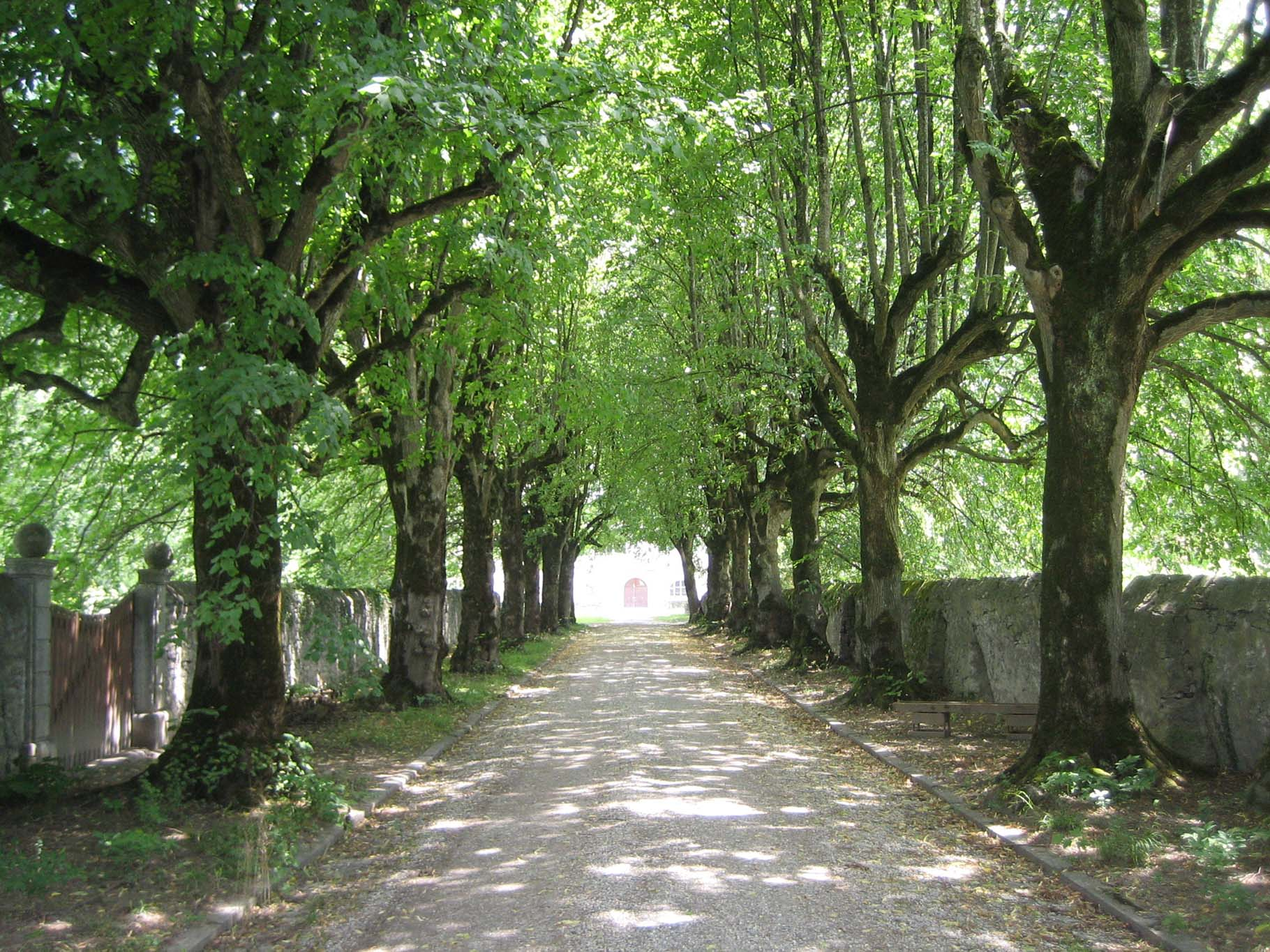
Road leading to the castle

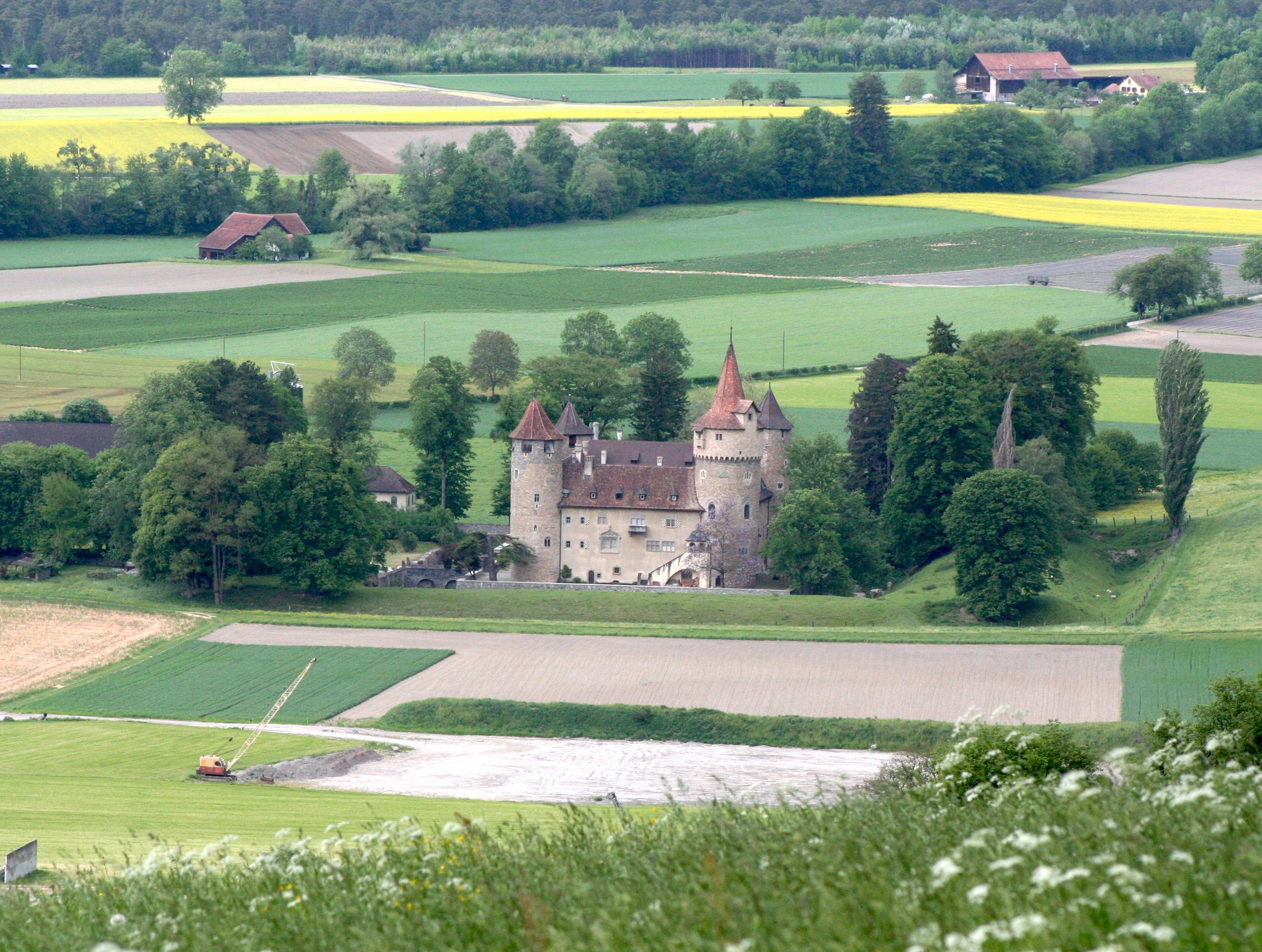
Castle and surrounding countryside

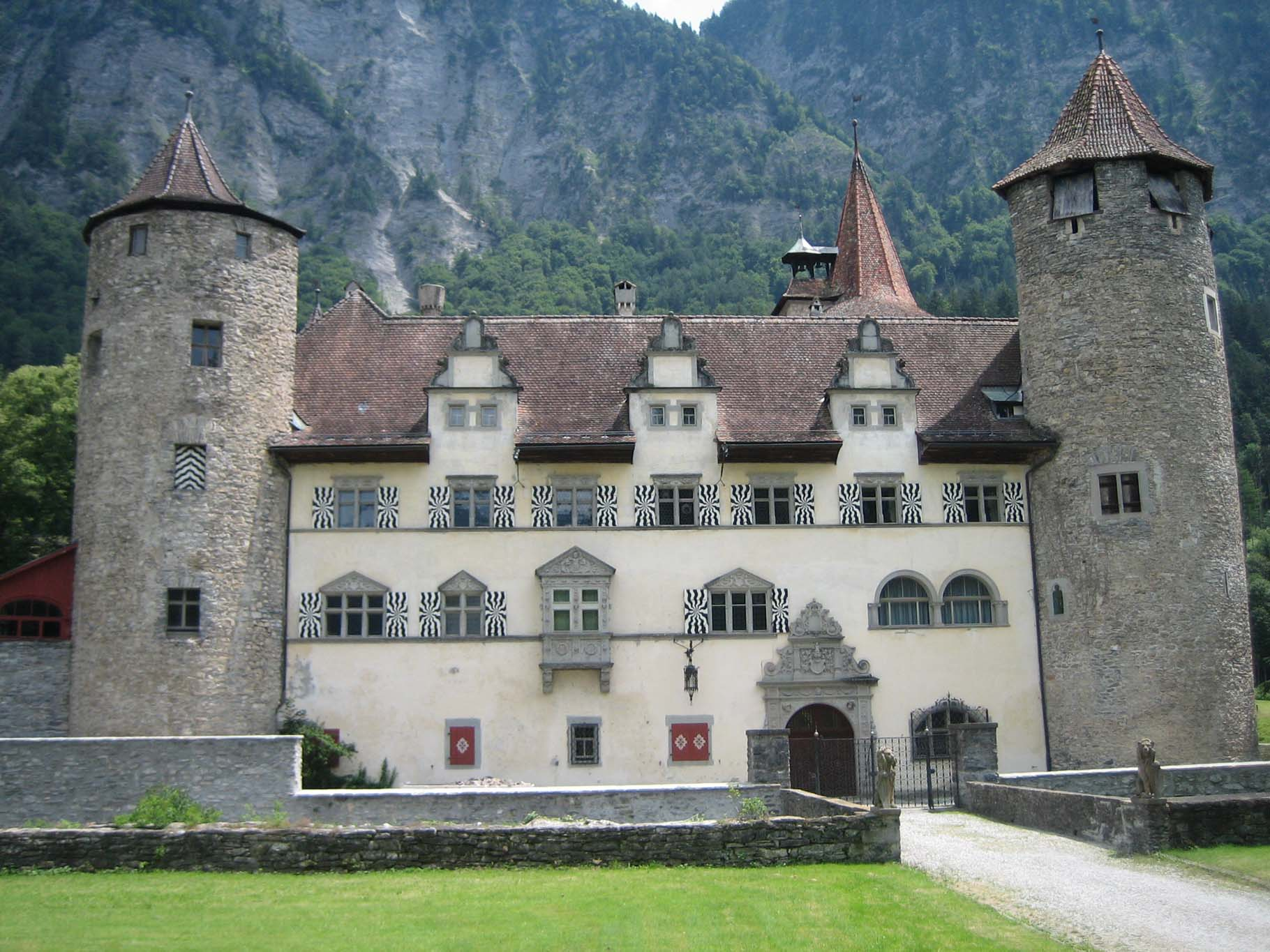
Front view of the castle

=== Castles ===
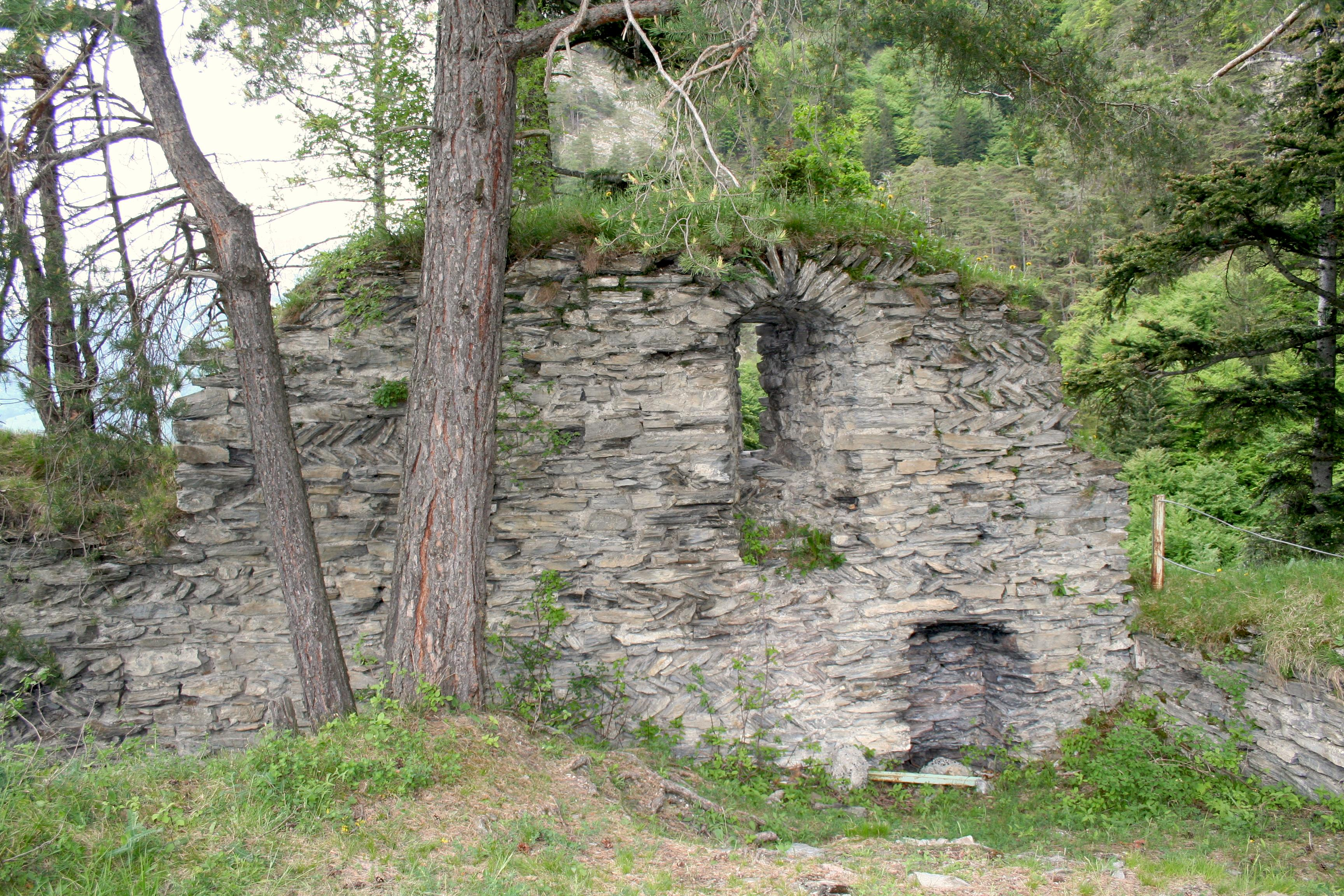
North wall of Falkenstein Castle

In addition to the Marschlins Castle, Landquart is also home to the ruins of Falkenstein Castle.

=== Churches ===
- The Roman Catholic Church of St. Fidelis was built in 1908 in Landquart village.
- The current Reformed church in Igis village was built to its current appearance in 1486. At that time, the nave was extended to the south and the choir was expanded. The main portal was also built in 1486, as this date is carved into the stone. The paintings on the north-east wall date from before the 1486 renovation. It is believed that this wall is part of St. Damian's Church in Ovine that was mentioned in 841, though this identification is debated. Part of the identification rests on the fact that the bell of the church contains an inscription that indicates that it was dedicated to Cosmas and Damian. Regardless, the current church is clearly mentioned about 1300 in the records of Pfäfers Abbey.
- The Church in Landquart village was built in the 20th Century as the village section grew. The land was acquired in 1914, though construction began only in 1925. Construction finished on 11 January 1926.

Adventist Church Landquart | Schulstrasse 76 | 7302 Landquart (next to Forum im Ried)-

=== Hiking trails ===
The Prättigauer Höhenweg begins at the Landquart railway station and ends at Klosters.

== Economy ==
Landquart is classed as a regional business center and is the center of the Landquart region.

As of 2014, there were a total of 5,917 people employed in the municipality. Of these, a total of 151 people worked in 38 businesses in the primary economic sector. There was one mid sized primary sector business with a total of 61 employees. The secondary sector employed 2,019 workers in 109 separate businesses. In 2014 a total of 761 employees worked in 103 small companies (less than 50 employees). There were 4 mid sized businesses with 476 employees and 2 large businesses which employed 782 people. Finally, the tertiary sector provided 3,747 jobs in 495 businesses. There were 53 small businesses with a total of 1,291 employees and 9 mid sized businesses with a total of 1,080 employees. In 2015 a total of 14.7% of the population received social assistance.

In 2011 the unemployment rate in the municipality was 2.3%.

In 2015 there was one movie theater in the municipality with 98 seats.

In 2015 the average cantonal, municipal and church tax rate in the municipality for a couple with two children making SFr 80,000 was 3.7% while the rate for a single person making SFr 150,000 was 15.8%, both of which are close to the average for the canton and the national average. In 2013 the average income in the municipality per tax payer was SFr 69,894 and the per person average was SFr 29,519, which is less than the cantonal average of SFr 69,964 and SFr 33,075 respectively It is also less than the national per tax payer average of SFr 82,682 and the per person average of SFr 35,825.

== Politics ==
In the 2015 federal election the most popular party was the SVP with 34.7% of the vote. The next three most popular parties were the SP (21.4%), the BDP (14.9%) and the CVP (11.4%). In the federal election, a total of 2,429 votes were cast, and the voter turnout was 41.4%.

== Transportation ==
The municipality has three railway stations: Landquart, Landquart Ried, and Igis. All three are located on the Landquart–Thusis line of the Rhaetian Railway with regular service to Disentis/Mustér, Scuol-Tarasp, Rhäzüns, and Schiers. In addition, Swiss Federal Railways serves Landquart with connections to Basel SBB and Zürich Hauptbahnhof.
