= Igis =

- Former municipality
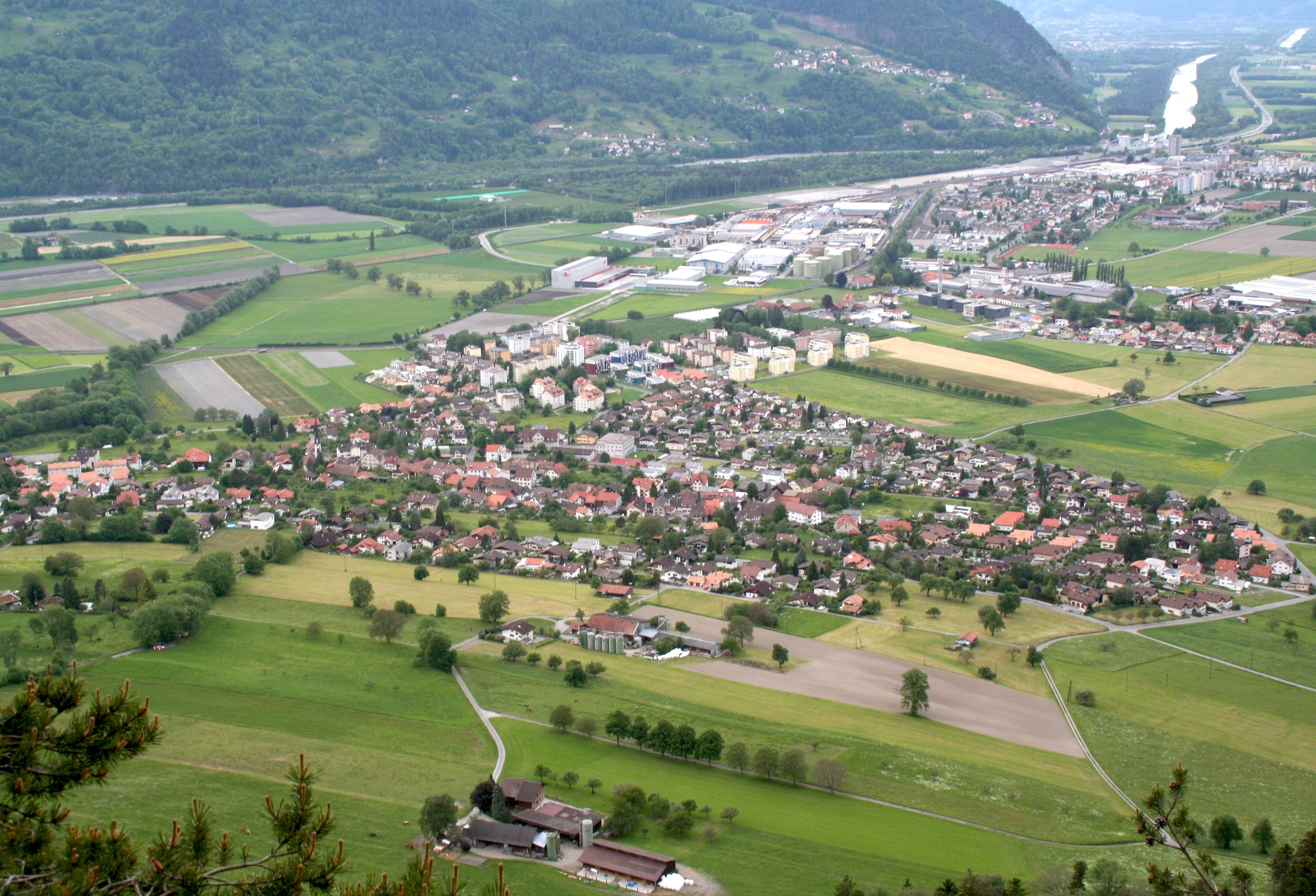

- Flag Coat of arms
- Location of Igis
- Location within Switzerland Location within Canton of Graubünden
- Coordinates: 46°57′N 9°34′E
- Country: Switzerland
- Canton: Graubünden
- District: Landquart

Area
  - Total: 10.92 km^{2} (4.22 sq mi)
- Elevation: 563 m (1,847 ft)

Population (December 2020)
  - Total: 7,738
  - Density: 708.6/km^{2} (1,835/sq mi)
- Time zone: UTC+01:00 (CET)
  - Summer (DST): UTC+02:00 (CEST)
- Postal code: 7206
- SFOS number: 3942
- ISO 3166 code: CH-GR
- Surrounded by: Maienfeld, Malans, Mastrils, Valzeina, Zizers
- Website: www.igis.ch

Igis (Romansh: Eigias) is a former municipality in the district of Landquart in the Swiss canton of Graubünden. Far better known than its proper name Igis is its hamlet Landquart, because of its Rail Station and motorway exit. The municipalities of Igis and Mastrils merged on 1 January 2012 into the new municipality of Landquart.

== History ==
Igis is first mentioned about 840 as Ovinae/Aviuns. In 1149 it was mentioned as Auuine, in 1225 as Huiuns and in 1253 as Yges.

== Geography ==
Aerial view (1963)

Igis had an area, as of 2006, of 10.9 km^{2} (4.2 sq mi). Of this area, 44.2% is used for agricultural purposes, while 30.4% is forested. Of the rest of the land, 20.4% is settled (buildings or roads) and the remainder (4.9%) is non-productive (rivers, glaciers or mountains).

The municipality is located in the Fünf Dörfer sub-district of the Landquart district. It is a transportation hub for the Rheintal-Prättigau region and is the third largest municipality (by population) in Graubünden. It consists of the village of Igis and the section of Landquart and (until 2004) Landquart Fabriken.

== Demographics ==
Igis had a population (as of 31 December 2020) of 7,738. As of 2008, 15.6% of the population was made up of foreign nationals. Over the last 10 years the population has grown at a rate of 3.8%. Most of the population (as of 2000) speaks German (83.2%), with Serbo-Croatian being second most common ( 3.8%) and Italian being third ( 2.8%).

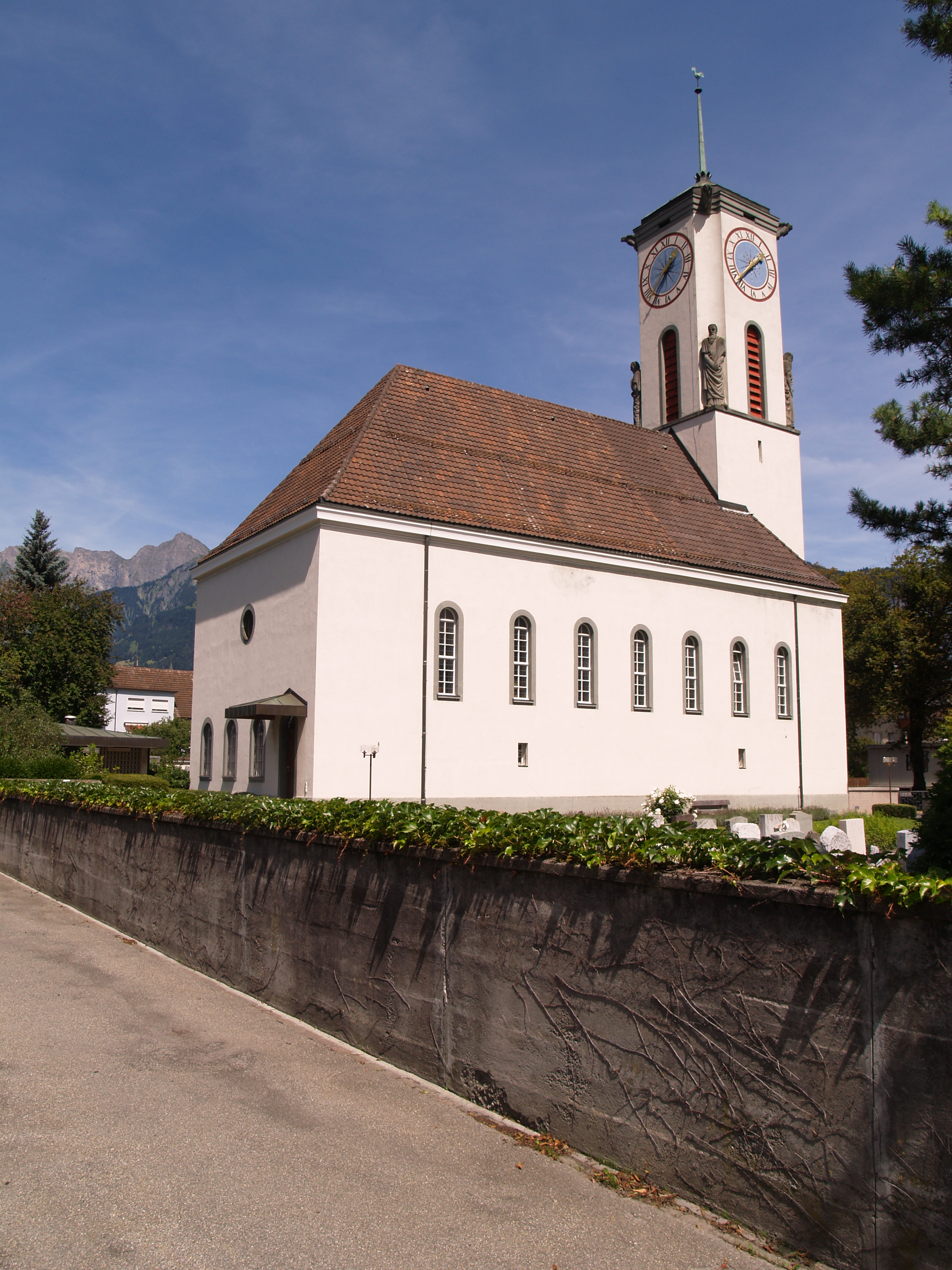
Protestant church of Igis

As of 2000, the gender distribution of the population was 49.4% male and 50.6% female. The age distribution, as of 2000, in Igis is; 849 children or 11.7% of the population are between 0 and 9 years old. 625 teenagers or 8.6% are 10 to 14, and 527 teenagers or 7.3% are 15 to 19. Of the adult population, 851 people or 11.8% of the population are between 20 and 29 years old. 1,168 people or 16.2% are 30 to 39, 1,186 people or 16.4% are 40 to 49, and 832 people or 11.5% are 50 to 59. The senior population distribution is 571 people or 7.9% of the population are between 60 and 69 years old, 407 people or 5.6% are 70 to 79, there are 189 people or 2.6% who are 80 to 89, and there are 23 people or 0.3% who are 90 to 99.

In Igis about 67% of the population (between age 25-64) have completed either non-mandatory upper secondary education or additional higher education (either university or a Fachhochschule).

Igis has an unemployment rate of 1.82%. As of 2005, there were 144 people employed in the primary economic sector and about 26 businesses involved in this sector. 1,535 people are employed in the secondary sector and there are 80 businesses in this sector. 2,184 people are employed in the tertiary sector, with 257 businesses in this sector.

From the 2000 census, 2,735 or 37.8% are Roman Catholic, while 3,046 or 42.1% belonged to the Swiss Reformed Church. Of the rest of the population, there are 162 individuals (or about 2.24% of the population) who belong to the Orthodox Church, and there are 166 individuals (or about 2.30% of the population) who belong to another Christian church. There are less than 5 individuals who are Jewish, and 562 (or about 7.78% of the population) who are Islamic. There are 83 individuals (or about 1.15% of the population) who belong to another church (not listed on the census), 335 (or about 4.63% of the population) belong to no church, are agnostic or atheist, and 139 individuals (or about 1.92% of the population) did not answer the question.

The historical population is given in the following table:

Population
Year	Igis	Landquart-Fabriken	Landquart	Total
2008	3119		4442	7561
2007	3099		4410	7509
2006	3022		4318	7340
2005	3088		4344	7432
2004	3116		4309	7425
2003	3123	644	3648	7415
2002	3136	645	3549	7330
2000	3138	659	3601	7398
1990	2373	678	3728	6779
1980	1120	644	3389	5153
1970	no data	no data	no data	5283
1950	no data	no data	no data	2794
1900	no data	no data	no data	1201
1850	no data	no data	no data	637

== Politics ==
The leadership of the municipality is elected every four years and consists of a president and six members.

Town council (2009–2012)
Name	Department	Party
Nigg Ernst	President	SVP
Eugster Rico	Environment	FDP
Brandenburger Agnes	Culture and Recreation	SVP
Föhn Sepp	Education	CVP
Florin Andrea	Construction	SVP
Thöny Andreas	IBIL	SP
Zanetti Livio	Police and Safety	CVP

In the 2007 federal election the most popular party was the SVP which received 35.7% of the vote. The next three most popular parties were the SP (27.8%), the FDP (17.1%) and the CVP (15.8%).

== Sightseeing and culture ==
=== Heritage sites of national significance ===
Marschlins Castle and the surrounding grounds are listed as a Swiss heritage site of national significance. The castle was the primary residence of the noble Salis-Marschlins family until it was sold in 1934. It is still privately owned.

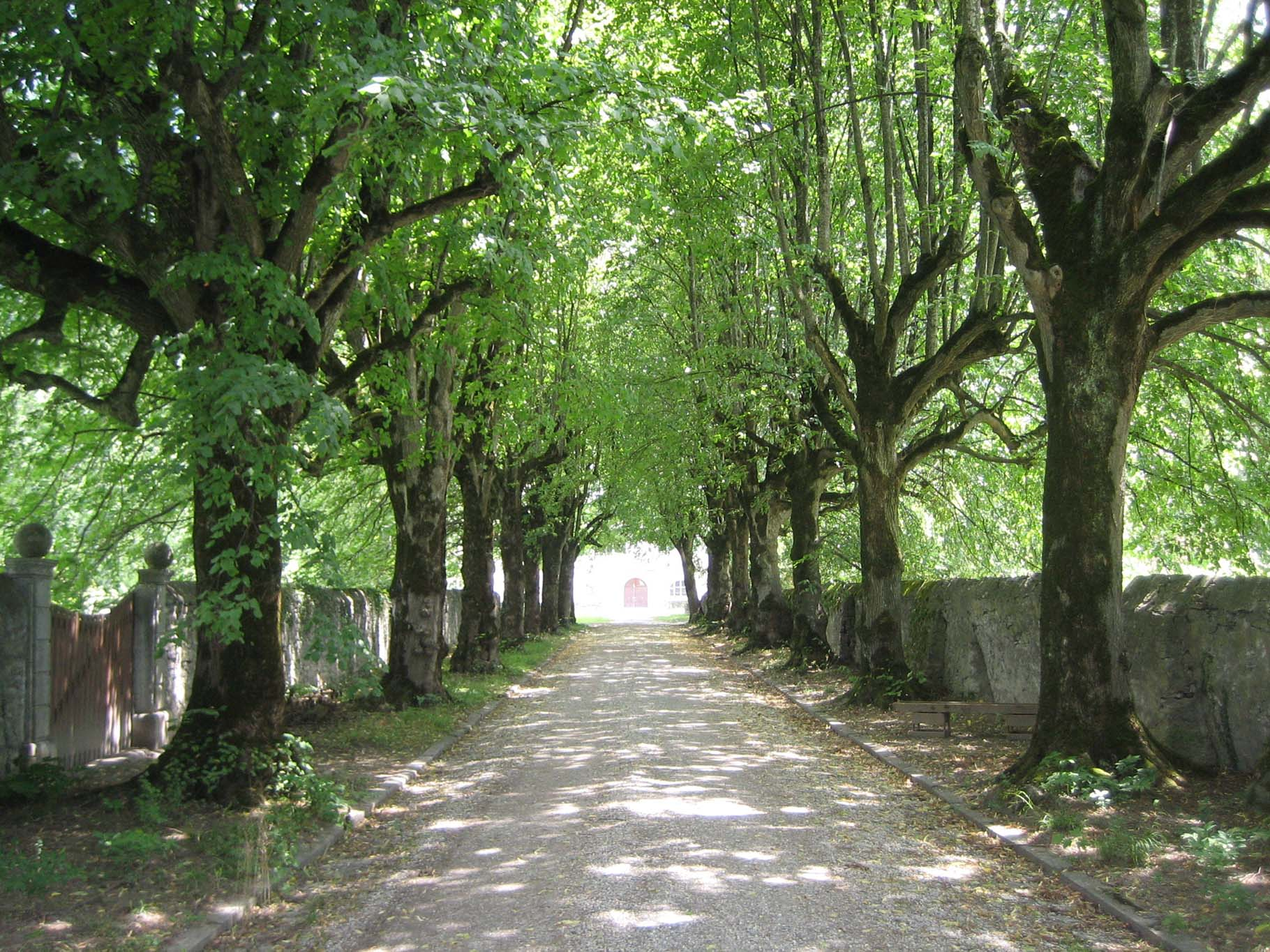
Road leading to the castle

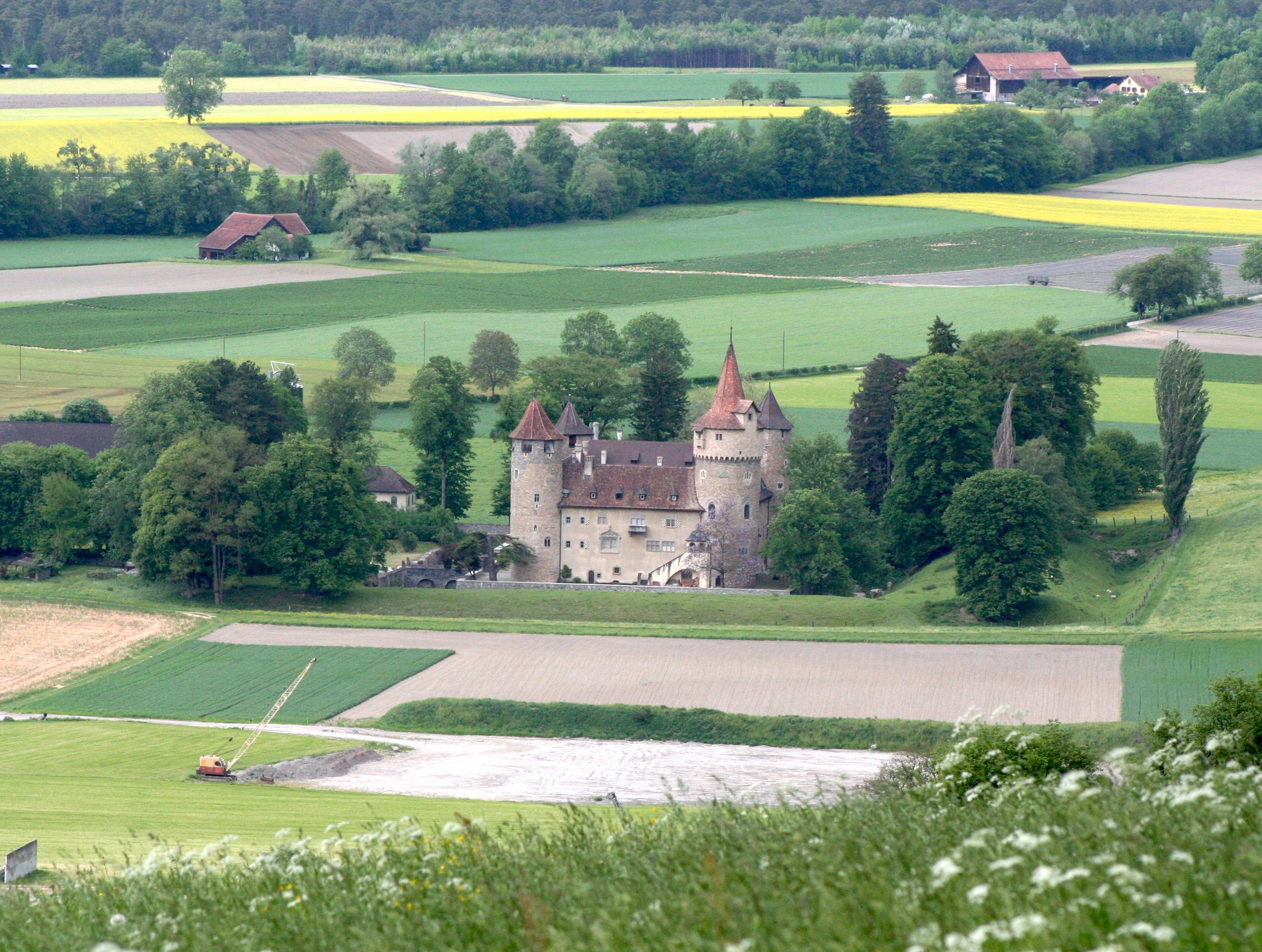
Castle and surrounding countryside

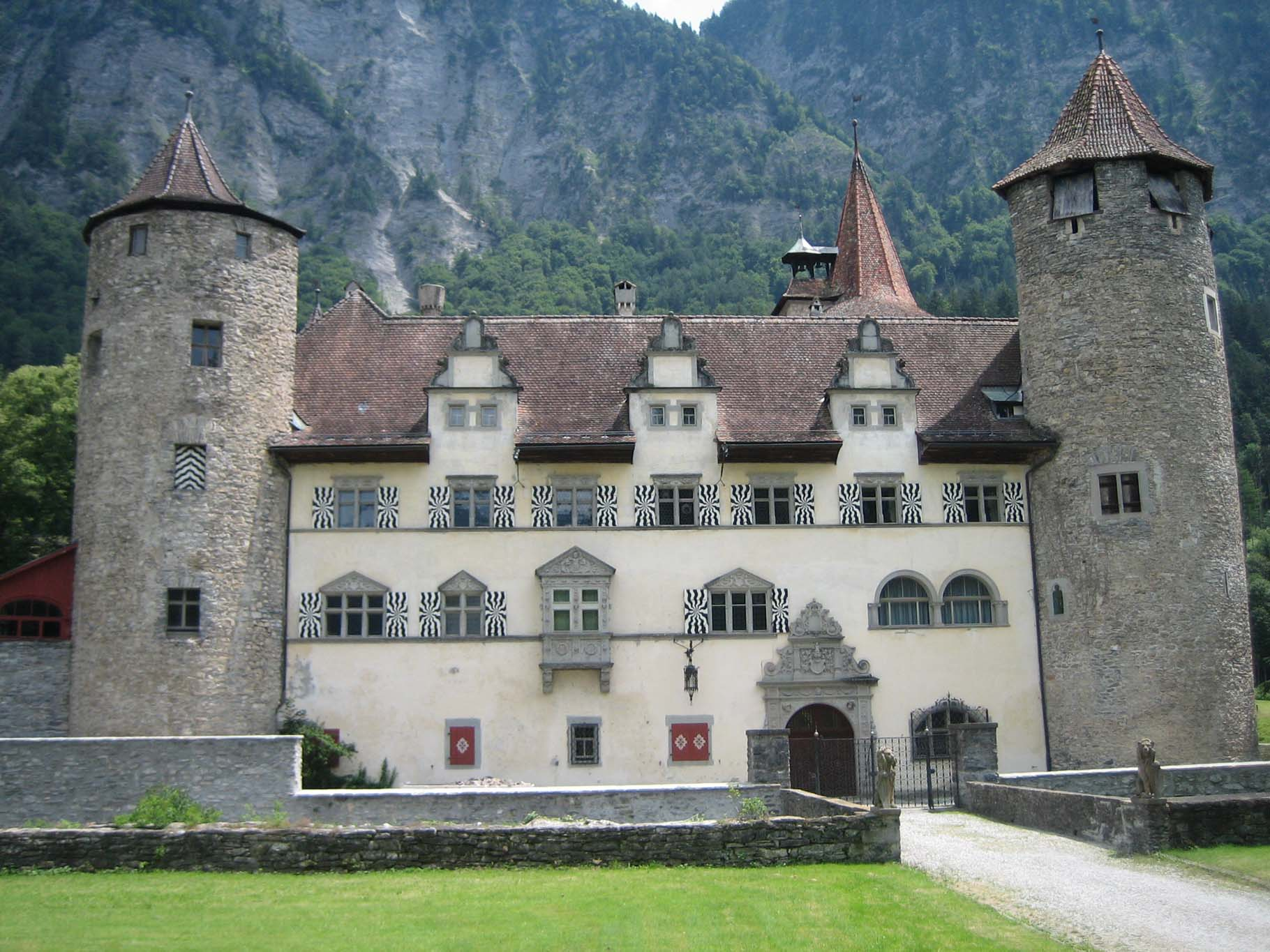
Front view of the castle

=== Castles ===
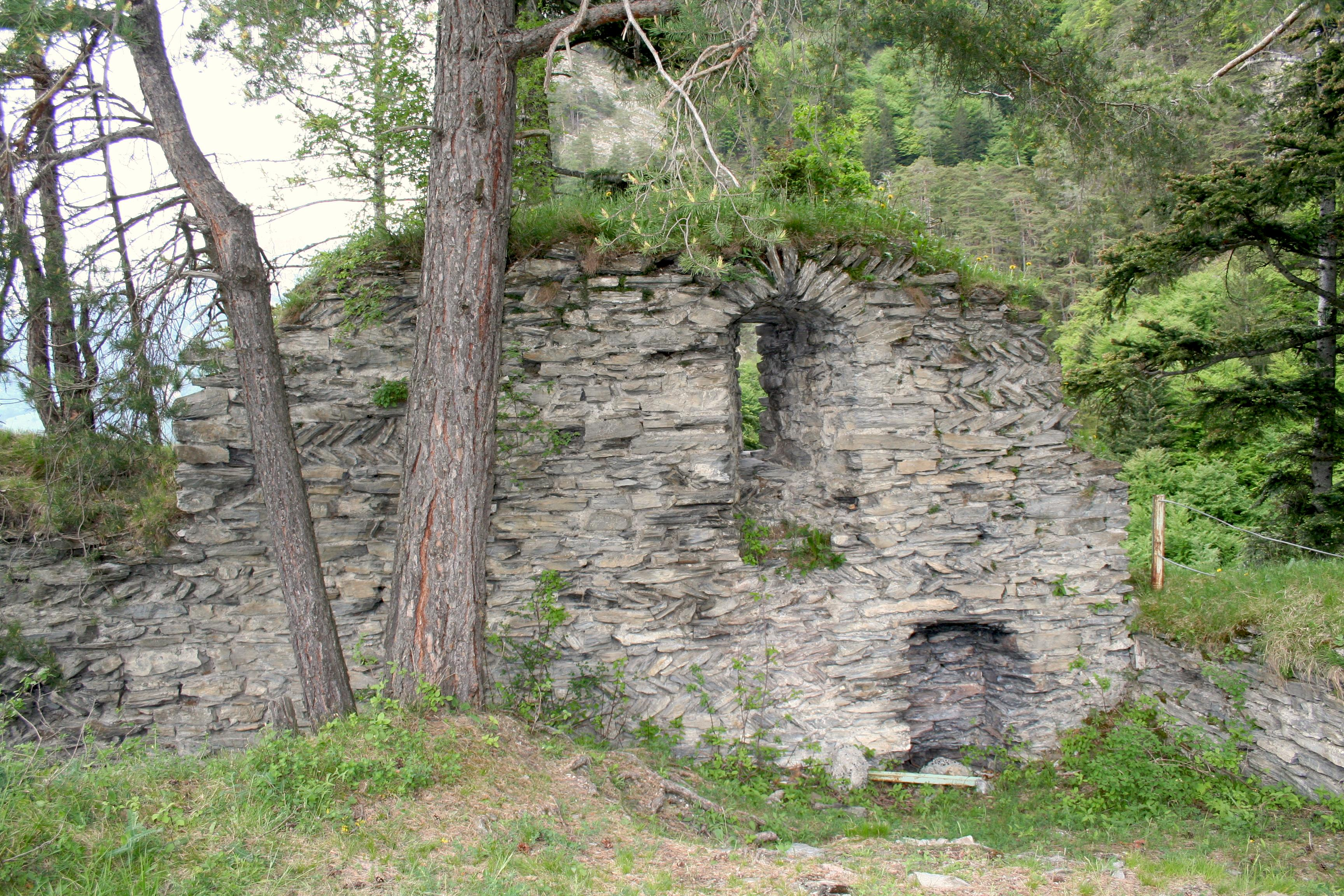
North wall of Berg Falkenstein

In addition to the Marschlins Castle, Igis is also home to the ruins of Falkenstein Castle.

=== Churches ===
- The Roman Catholic Church of St. Fidelis was built in 1908 in Landquart.
- The current Reformed church in Igis was built to its current appearance in 1486. At that time, the nave was extended to the south and the choir was expanded. The main portal was also built in 1486, as this date is carved into the stone. The paintings on the north-east wall date from before the 1486 renovation. It is believed that this wall is part of St. Damian's Church in Ovine that was mentioned in 841, though this identification is debated. Part of the identification rests on the fact that the bell of the church contains an inscription that indicates that it was dedicated to Cosmas and Damian. Regardless, the current church is clearly mentioned about 1300 in the records of Pfäfers Abbey.
- The Church in Landquart was built in the 20th Century as the village section grew. The land was acquired in 1914, though construction began only in 1925. Construction finished on 11 January 1926.

Arriving at Landquart railway station you may also want to continue by foot in a multiday hike towards Klosters on the Prättigauer Höhenweg instead of using the Rhetian Railway.
